= Procne (disambiguation) =

Procne (Ancient Greek: Πρόκνη) may refer to:

- Procne (or Prokne), sister to Philomela, as well as the wife of Tereus, and mother of Itys.
- Procne and Itys (sculpture), a statue of Procne and Itys
- 194 Prokne, an asteroid
- In the Golden Sun videogame series, one summon is Procne, described as "a goddess in bird form"
