= The Love of the Nightingale =

1988 play by Timberlake Wertenbaker

The Love of the Nightingale is a play by Timberlake Wertenbaker, commissioned for the Royal Shakespeare Company and first performed in 1988 at The Other Place, Stratford. It is an adaptation of the Ancient Greek legend of the rape of Philomela by her brother-in-law Tereus, and the gruesome revenge undertaken by Philomela and her sister Procne. The play takes a feminist look at the ancient tale.

== Synopsis ==
The King of Athens, Pandion I, fights a war with Thebes over land. The King of Thrace, Tereus, helps out Pandion, and in return, Pandion allows Tereus to marry Procne, one of his two daughters. Procne obeys reluctantly. She is not attracted to her taciturn soldier of a husband, and she dreads being parted from her beloved and spirited sister Philomele. When she reaches Thrace, she struggles to adjust to life, as the women assigned to her have none of the cultural interests she has grown up with in Athens. She asks Tereus to return to Athens and bring her sister, Philomele, to come and see her, as she is the only one who understands her.

Tereus travels to Athens and takes Philomele on his ship. From an early stage, there are danger signals that Tereus is sexually attracted to his sister-in-law. Though Philomele herself is initially unaware of his interest, both her older servant and chaperone Niobe and the sailors can see the warning signs. After a while, Tereus starts finding ways to slow down their journey, to give him more time to try to seduce Philomele. As she finally realizes his intentions, she desperately reaches out to the Captain of the ship, a quiet, gentle man, in hopes of escape. But when Tereus finds them together, he angrily kills the Captain. In order to make her weak and vulnerable, Tereus now informs Philomele untruthfully that Procne has died during his absence. When Philomele continues to resist his advances, he rapes her. Later, due to her determination to rebel and inform her sister, who she has worked out by now is not dead, he cuts out her tongue.

On his return home, Tereus informs Procne that Philomele was drowned on the journey. Five years pass.

Philomele has in fact been living in isolation for 5 years, and has seen nobody except the king (who initially visited her occasionally), Niobe and Niobe's servant. Niobe takes her to the annual Bachann/Dionysian festival, which is the only day of the year in which the women can drink and run wild. Using large dolls she has made, Philomele performs a re-enactment of the rape in order to inform Procne that she is alive and of what Tereus has done. In revenge, Procne kills her own young son with Tereus, Itys. As Tereus begins to chase the women, his intent being to kill them, the gods turn Procne into a swallow, Tereus into a hoopoe and Philomele into a nightingale.

== Productions ==
In 2012, Progress Theatre put on a youth production of the play. Several songs were written specifically for the production. The production was most praised for the way it involved youths in the conversation on rape culture and allowed them to explore adult themes that are conventionally tabooed. A 2014 production by Constellation Theatre Company of Washington DC featured an original musical score by Tom Teasley, which has been recorded and issued on CD.

In 2021, Theatreworks (Melbourne) put on a production of the play. The audience was seated in small groups in Perspex boxes around a central stage, due to the COVID-19 restrictions in place in Melbourne at the time.

== Adaptations ==
The 2007 opera of the same name by Australian composer Richard Mills is based on this play.
