= Aëdon =

Ancient Greek mythological figure

- Queen of Thebes
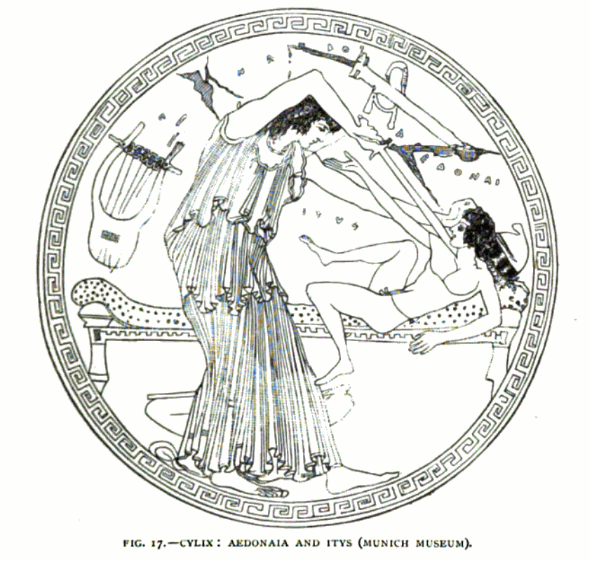
- Aëdonaia slays Itys, illustration from a 6th-century BC Greek vase by JE Harrison and DS MacColl (1894)
- Region: Thebes, Anatolia

Genealogy
- Parents: Pandareus (father); Harmothoë (mother)
- Siblings: Chelidon, Cleothera, Merope, unnamed brother
- Consorts: Zethus or Polytechnus
- Offspring: Itylus/Itys, Neis

Aëdon (Ancient Greek: Ἀηδών, romanized: Aēdṓn, lit. 'nightingale') was in Greek mythology, the daughter of Pandareus of Ephesus. According to Homer, she was the wife of Zethus, and the mother of Itylus. Aëdon features in two different stories, one set in Thebes and one set in Western Asia Minor, both of which contain filicide and explain the origin of the nightingale, a bird in constant mourning.

Aëdon serves as a doublet of the Athenian princess Procne in some versions of her myth.

== Etymology ==
The feminine noun ἀηδών translates to 'nightingale', and has a secondary meaning of 'singer'. It shares the same root with the verb ἀείδω meaning 'to sing, to chant, to praise'. This verb in turn derives from Proto-Hellenic *awéidō, which might be from a Proto-Indo-European root *h₂weyd-.

== Family ==
Aëdon was the daughter of Pandareus and his wife Harmothoë, and thus sister to either Cleothera and Merope, or Chelidon and an unnamed brother. According to the geographer Pausanias, Polygnotus supplanted the names of the former two with Cameiro and Clytie instead.

Aëdon either married Zethus, king of Thebes, and bore him an only son named Itylus, or Polytechnus, a carpenter of Colophon in Lydia, and bore him an only son named Itys. In some authors she also has a daughter named Neis.

== Mythology ==
=== Early life ===
Aëdon was the daughter of Pandareus, king of Miletus by his wife Harmothoë. However Pandareus along with Tantalus attempted to steal a sacred dog from Zeus in Crete, and after this great transgression Pandareus and Harmothoë were forced to flee to Athens and then to Sicily, where Zeus eventually smote them, leaving Aëdon and her sisters Cleothera and Merope orphans. Aëdon married Zethus, a son of Zeus, and became queen of Thebes. Cleothera and Merope meanwhile were adopted and raised by Aphrodite, the goddess of love and beauty. When they were grown she went to Zeus to find them suitable husbands, but while she was gone either the Winds or the Harpies snatched Cleothera and Merope away, and brought them to the Furies to serve them as handmaidens. It is not clear why Aëdon escaped such fate.

=== Thebes ===
Aëdon was the wife of Zethus, one of the twin kings of Thebes, but she accidentally ended up killing her own son Itylus, when 'madness was upon her'. Her story is evidently a very old one, as it was referenced as early as Homer in his Odyssey, when Penelope speaks to her husband Odysseus in the lines:

I lie upon my bed, and sharp cares, crowding close about my throbbing heart, disquiet me, as I mourn. Even as when the daughter of Pandareus, the nightingale of the greenwood, sings sweetly, when spring is newly come, as she sits perched amid the thick leafage of the trees, and with many trilling notes pours forth her rich voice in wailing for her child, dear Itylus, whom she had one day slain with the sword unwittingly, Itylus, the son of king Zethus; even so my heart sways to and fro in doubt,

— Homer, Odyssey lines 19.519-24; A.T. Murray's translation.

Eustathius of Thessalonica and other scholiasts explain that Aëdon was envious of her sister-in-law, Amphion's wife Niobe (Tantalus' daughter), who had fourteen children (seven sons and seven daughters) opposed to her single one (or two, as some authors also mention a daughter named Neis). Itylus however got along with his cousins, and often slept with them, in particular with Amaleus, Amphion and Niobe's firstborn. One day, Aëdon instructed Itylus to sleep in the innermost position of the bed that night. However Itylus forgot his mother's words, and so when Aëdon entered the bedroom with a knife at hand intending to kill Amaleus in his sleep, she killed her own son. Alternatively Aëdon could not tell who was which in the darkness. Another version states that she did manage to kill Amaleus as she wished, but then in fear of Niobe's reaction to the murder she knowingly killed her own child as well.

Aëdon mourned her only son greatly, and thus Zeus, the father of Amphion and Zethus, transformed her into a nightingale when Zethus began to hunt her down following Itylus's murder. A Homeric scholiast attributed the story of Aëdon killing her son in her effort to murder Niobe's to Pherecydes, a historian who lived during the fifth century BC. In this story Aëdon becomes Niobe's rival in the same way Leto does in the more known story concerning Niobe, both mothers of two children, boy and girl, who are threatened by Niobe's vast progeny. Aëdon thus occupies the same position as the goddess, but unlike Leto, she does not have the power to smite Niobe, and instead her efforts end in grief.

In yet another version, Aëdon was married to Zetes, one of the sons of the north wind god Boreas (perhaps a mixing up of the names Zethus and Zetes, as Zetes is otherwise unrelated to the story). Aëdon began suspecting (perhaps correctly) that Zetes had fallen in love with a hamadryad nymph, and further suspected that their son Aëtylus knew and was helping his father carry out the affair and covering up for him. In anger, Aëdon killed her son after he returned one day from hunting. In pity, Aphrodite changed the mother into a nightingale, which to this day mourns for her child.

It has been argued that Penelope chooses to mention Aëdon's story is because she is indirectly indicating her own desire to protect her son Telemachus, himself an only child who must hold his own against numerous male rivals and now as a grown-up acts independently of her like Itylus ignored his mother's orders, against danger.

=== Asia Minor ===
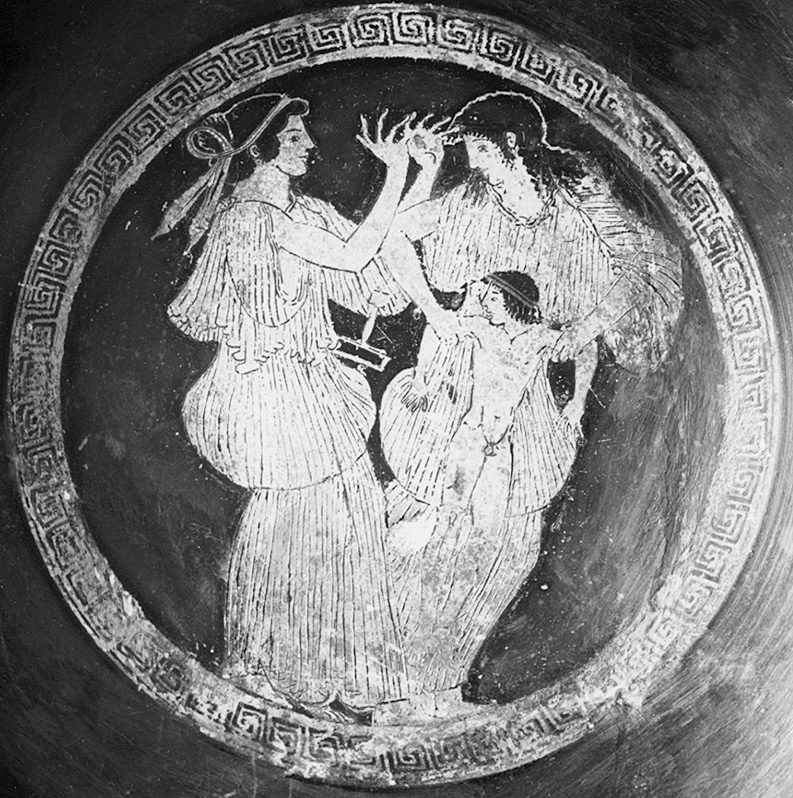
Athenian wine cup, circa 480 BC, depicting Philomela and Procne preparing to kill Itys (Louvre, Paris)

According to a later tradition preserved in Antoninus Liberalis who attributes the story to Hellenistic writer Boios, Aëdon is instead the daughter of Pandareus and the wife of Polytechnus, an artist from Colophon. The couple were happy as long as they honoured the gods, but eventually they boasted that they loved each other more than Hera and Zeus did. Hera sent Eris to cause trouble between the two of them. Polytechnus was then making a standing board for a chariot, and Aëdon a piece of embroidery, and they agreed that whoever should finish the work first should receive from the other a female slave as the prize. Polytechnus was furious when Aëdon (with Hera's help) won.

Obligated to find his wife a slave, he went to Aëdon's father, and pretending that his wife wished to see her sister Chelidon, he took her with him. On his way home he raped her, dressed her in slave's attire, commanded her into silence, and gave her to his wife as the promised prize. Aëdon, not recognising her sister, overworked her. After some time Chelidon, believing herself unobserved, lamented her harsh fate, but she was overheard by Aëdon, and the two sisters conspired against Polytechnus for revenge. They murdered her and Polytechnus' son Itys, cooked him, and served him up as a meal to his father and a neighbour.

Aëdon then fled with Chelidon back to their father, who, when Polytechnus came in pursuit of his wife, had him bound, smeared with honey, and exposed to the insects. Seeing that, Aëdon took pity upon the sufferings of her husband, so she began to drive away the flies. When her father, mother and brother saw what they perceived as treason on her part, they were angered to the point of killing her, so Zeus changed them all into birds. Polytechnus was turned into a woodpecker for having been a carpenter, the brother of Aëdon into a hoopoe, Pandareus into a sea-eagle, her mother into a kingfisher, Chelidon into a swallow, and Aëdon herself into a nightingale, which would lament her lost child for the rest of time.

== Origin ==
=== Other versions ===
All versions of the story provide an aetion for the nightingale's sad song, as the mournful Aëdon spends her new life lamenting the death of her child. In reality however when it comes to nightingales the female of the species does not sing, only the male.

The Anatolian variation seems to have originated in mere etymologies, as it is essentially identical to the myth of Philomela and Procne; Procne was an Athenian princess who married Tereus, the king of Thrace, and had a son named Itys with him. Tereus then raped and mutilated Procne's sister Philomela, who informed her sister of the deed with a tapestry. Procne and Philomela then slew Itys and served him to his father, who chased down the two sisters until all three were changed into birds.

Joseph Fontenrose identified five versions of Aëdon's legend, dubbing them F, G, H, J and K (A through E cover the different versions of Athamas's myth, which have structural similarities with Aëdon's); F is the version with Aëtylus and the hamadryad, G the version with Niobe and Amaleus, H the one with Polytechnus and Chelidon set in Asia Minor, J is the most well-known one starring Procne and Philomela, with K as a variation of J in which Tereus lies about Procne dying in order to marry Philomela whom he later gives to another king named Lynceus.

Fontenrose noted the similarities of the Aëdon group with the Athamas group, namely the themes of polygamy, the birth and death of multiple children, the concealment or disguise of another woman, a rivalry of a wife and a mistress figure, and a woman killing her own child by mistake, which end in bird metamorphosis. Particularly he compared the element of the wife killing her son after her husband rapes her sister to the tale of Athamas' wife Ino killing their sons after he cheated on her with the slave Antiphera.

=== Development ===
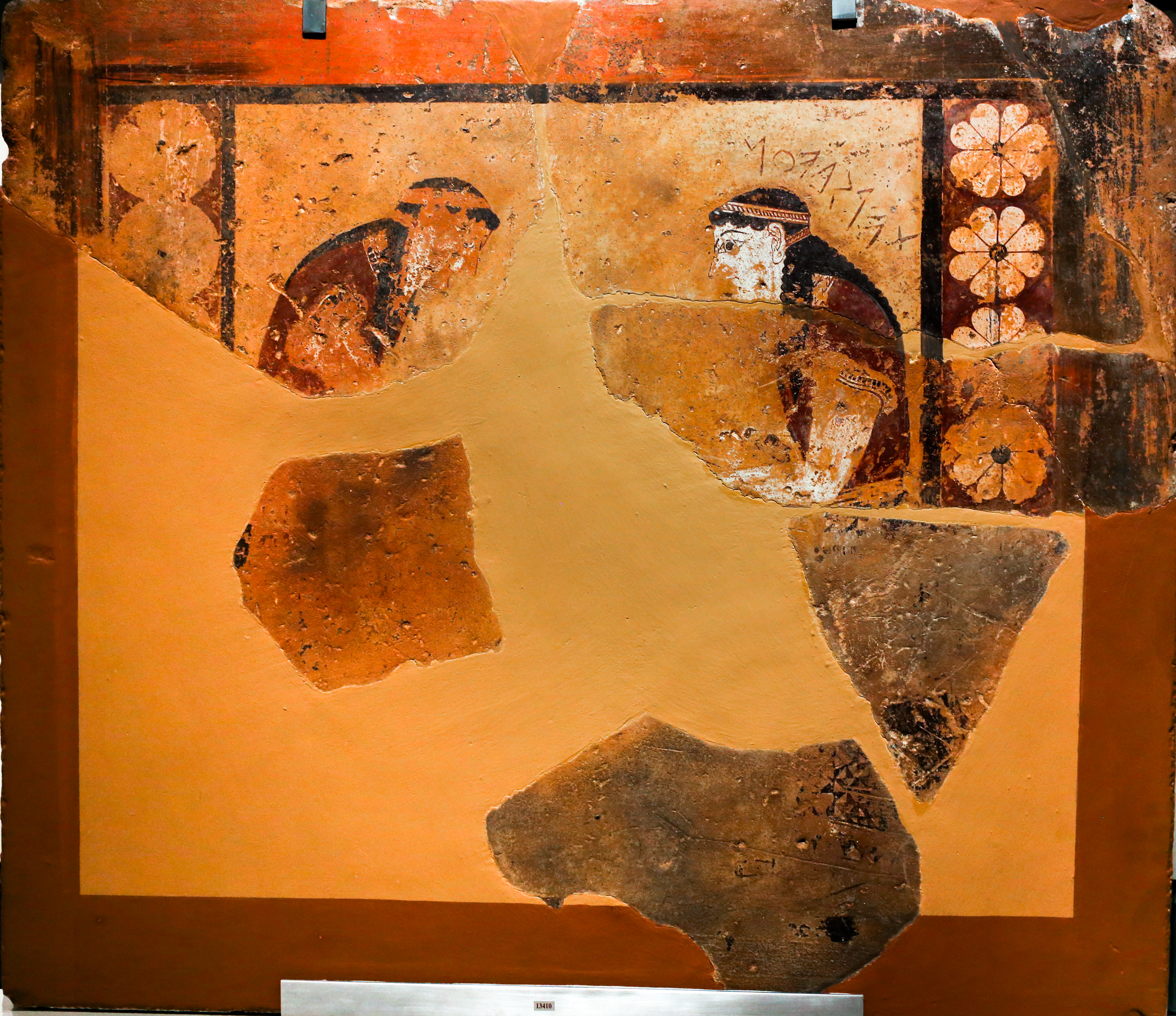
Aëdon and Chelidon on a metope from Apollo's temple at Thermos, 630–625 BC.

Homer knew about Pandareus's daughter the Nightingale (Aëdon) who married to Zethus and killed her son Itys, but makes no mention of the Swallow (Chelidon); Hesiod and Sappho both say that the Swallow is the daughter of Pandion I (Athenian king, the father of Philomela). Nevertheless it is not clear how and when exactly the story present in the Odyssey led to the popular version presented by most authors. Elements common in the version with Procne seem to have blended early on; a fragmentary seventh-century BC metope from Apollo's temple at Thermos depicts two women, labelled Nightingale and Swallow, plotting together over something that has been broken off, apparently Itys, meaning that the Attic version was known during at least the seventh century BC and the swallow-sister had already entered the scene. Sixth century BC art provides more visual evidence. It is thus likely that the version Pherecydes and Homer were familiar with was a form of version G, though the metope and Hesiod hint to an early story of the H-J-K type.

The name Tereus meanwhile is first attested in Aeschylus, as the husband of Aëdon/the Nightingale who killed her own son and now laments him, chased by the hawk. There is an intense debate on whether Aeschylus means for μήτις (mḗtis, meaning 'cunning' or 'crafty') to be understood here as the proper name of the Nightingale; most scholars agree that there is no precedent for Tereus' wife's name to be Metis, so the word should be treated as an adjective.

So while there is precedent for the child murder, it seems that the rape and mutilation of the sister were introduced by Sophocles in his lost Tereus play, where he likely also introduced 'Procne' and 'Philomela' as the names for the Nightingale and the Swallow, as well as the Thracian setting. The myth can thus be interpreted as F with the names from J-K and a sister-in-law in place of the hamadryad. Fontenrose suggests that Homer knew of a story of two rival wives, one of which plotted against the other's child; the story then deviated in two ways; the second wife, which was identified with the swallow, became either a sister-in-law (husband's brother's wife) or a sister and a mistress to the husband.

Aëdon is traditionally the daughter of Pandareus, himself associated with Crete or the western coast of Asia Minor, while Procne's father is the Athenian Pandion. It is possible that when Aëdon's story crossed the Aegean, Pandareus became confused with Pandion due to their names' similarity, and thus the nightingale and the swallow joined the Athenian mythos, as foreign intruders; Philomela and Procne are otherwise detached from the rest of the traditions surrounding the Athenian royal family. Furthermore, in the Theban setting, Aëdon's husband Zethus and rival Niobe also seem like interpolations; Zethus and Amphion act as a parenthesis in the bloodline of Cadmus, and the Phrygian Niobe usually has a home at Mount Sipylus in Asia Minor. The Homeric version did not disappear altogether as the two narratives enjoyed simultaneous popularity until Sophocles' play and Aristophanes' parody of it; thereafter mentions of the Homeric version drop except in scholiasts and commentators.

== See also ==
- Harpalyce
- Ino
- Lamia
- Medea
