= Procne and Itys (sculpture) =

Sculpture from the Acropolis of Athens

- Πρόκνη και Ίτυς (Greek)
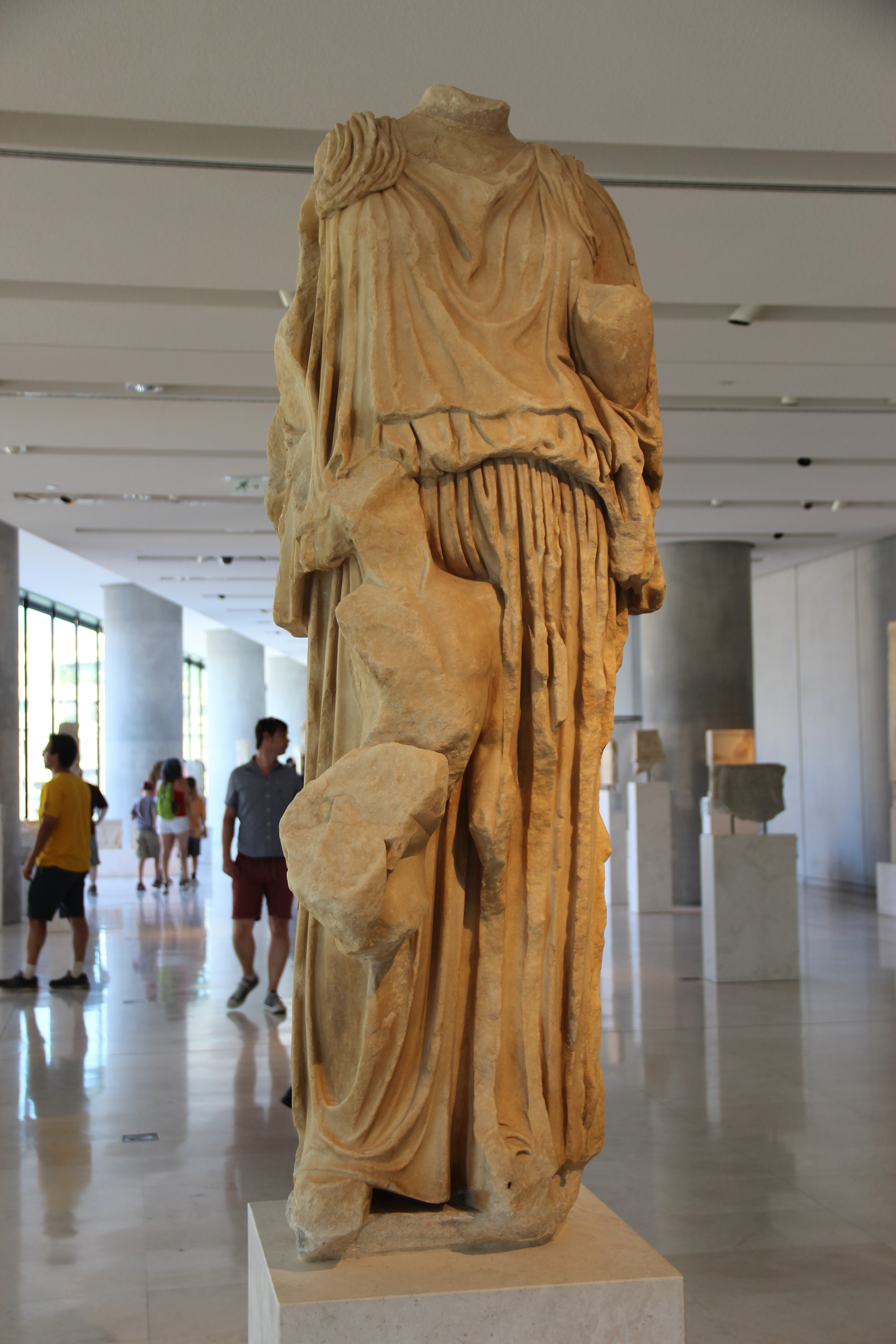
- The statue in the ACMA
- Year: c. 430 BC
- Catalogue: No 1358
- Medium: Marble
- Movement: Classical
- Subject: Procne killing Itys
- Dimensions: 163 cm × 44 cm (64 in × 17 in)
- Condition: Fragments missing
- Location: Acropolis Museum, Athens
- Owner: Greece
- Website: https://www.theacropolismuseum.gr/

The statue of Procne and Itys (Greek: Πρόκνη και Ίτυς) is a Greek marble sculpture of the fifth century BC which once adorned the Acropolis of Athens, created by sculptor Alcamenes. The statue depicts the Athenian princess Procne about to strike her own son Itys dead as revenge against her husband Tereus. It was discovered near the temple of Athena-Nike during the early nineteenth century, and it is now exhibited in the Acropolis Museum of Athens, in Greece.

== The myth ==
In Greek mythology, Procne was an Athenian princess, daughter of King Pandion I, who was given as wife to King Tereus of Thrace, and bore him a son, Itys. Years passed and Procne wished to see her sister Philomela again. Tereus agreed to go to Athens and escort Philomela to Thrace, but during the journey back home, he raped and imprisoned the young Philomela, and cut off her tongue so that she could not tell anyone what transpired.

Tereus went to Procne and lied about her sister dying. Philomela, unable to speak, wove a tapestry instead and sent it to Procne. Procne rescued her sister, and wanting to enact revenge on her husband, slew their little son Itys, and fed him to this father during dinner. Tereus, furious, grabbed his sword and chased down the two sisters. In the end, the gods transformed all three into birds; Procne into a nightingale, Philomela a swallow, and Tereus a hoopoe.

== History ==
The statue was made during the Classical Greek era, around 430 BC, and was mentioned by the traveller Pausanias when he visited Attica in the second century AD:

Those who prefer artistic workmanship to mere antiquity may look at the following: [...] Procne too, who has already made up her mind about the boy, and Itys as well—a group dedicated by Alcamenes.

— Pausanias, Description of Greece 1.24.3

The sculpture was dedicated by the sculptor Alcamenes, who is taken to have been its creator as well. It was discovered the year 1836 in front of the western tower of the Propylaea, near the temple of Athena Nike. It is now housed in the Acropolis Museum in Athens with inventory number 1358.

== Description ==
The life-size statue is made of marble. Procne (and thus the sculpture as a whole) is 1.63 m. tall (without the head), while Itys stands at 1,05 m. Its total width amounts to 44 cm.

The woman, Procne is clothed in a thin chiton which is tied with a girdle at her waist, and pinned on the shoulders, around which it is wound, while part of it falls back on the body forming beautiful folds over her breast. A himation is draped over her shoulders, which falls back and covers the entire posterior of the statue. The boy is clinging to his mother, and is completely naked. Five holes, with remains of metal rods in two of them, can be seen around the perimeter of the boy's head.

The head of Procne, her right hand where she would have held the knife, and the legs and large parts of the torso of Itys are not preserved. A marble head was also found and presumed to belong to this statue, but is not currently attached due to doubts whether it really is Procne's head.

== See also ==
- Nike Fixing her Sandal
- Three-Bodied Daemon
- Persian Rider

== Bibliography ==
- Bell, Robert E. (1991). Women of Classical Mythology: A Biographical Dictionary. ABC-Clio. ISBN 9780874365818.
- Casson, Stanley (1921). Catalogue of The Acropolis Museum. Vol. IΙ: Sculpture and Architectural Fragments. Cambridge University Press.
- Gantz, Timothy (1996). Early Greek Myth: A guide to literary and artistic sources. Baltimore, MD: Johns Hopkins University Press; in two volumes: (Vol. 1) ISBN 978-0-8018-5360-9; (Vol. 2) ISBN 978-0-8018-5362-3.
- Grimal, Pierre (1986). A Concise Dictionary of Classical Mythology. Translated by A. R. Maxwell-Hyslop. Oxford: Basil Blackwell, Ltd. ISBN 0-631-16696-3.
- Pausanias, Pausanias Description of Greece with an English Translation by W.H.S. Jones, Litt.D., and H.A. Ormerod, M.A., in 4 Volumes. Cambridge, MA, Harvard University Press; London, William Heinemann Ltd. 1918. Online version at the Perseus Digital Library.
- Trianti, Ismene (1998). Το Μουσείο Ακροπόλεως [The Acropolis Museum] (PDF) (in Greek). Athens, Greece: OLKOS publications. ISBN 960-7169-84-0.
