= 194 Prokne =

Main-belt asteroid

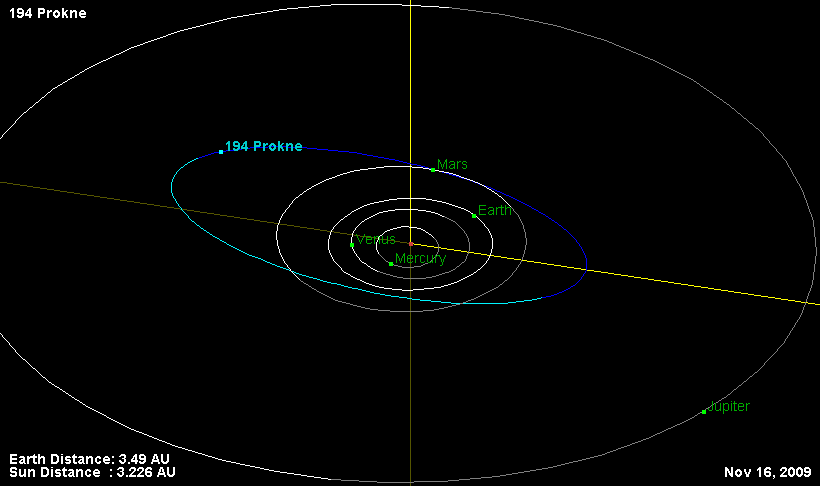
- Orbital diagram

Discovery
- Discovered by: C. H. F. Peters, 1879
- Discovery date: 21 March 1879

Designations
- Pronunciation: /ˈprɒkniː/
- Named after: Procne
- Alternative designations: A879 FA
- Minor planet category: Main belt
- Adjectives: Proknean /prɒkˈniːən/

Orbital characteristics
- Epoch 31 July 2016 (JD 2457600.5)
- Uncertainty parameter 0
- Observation arc: 136.76 yr (49950 d)
- Aphelion: 3.2386 AU (484.49 Gm)
- Perihelion: 1.9930 AU (298.15 Gm)
- Semi-major axis: 2.6158 AU (391.32 Gm)
- Eccentricity: 0.23810
- Orbital period (sidereal): 4.23 yr (1545.3 d)
- Mean anomaly: 42.282°
- Mean motion: 0° 13^{m} 58.692^{s} / day
- Inclination: 18.509°
- Longitude of ascending node: 159.32°
- Argument of perihelion: 163.24°
- Earth MOID: 0.986917 AU (147.6407 Gm)
- Jupiter MOID: 2.15988 AU (323.113 Gm)
- T_{Jupiter}: 3.295

Physical characteristics
- Dimensions: 168.42±4.1 km 170.33±6.92 km (composite estimate)
- Mass: (2.68±0.29)×10^{18} kg (composite estimate) (2.82±0.52)×10^{18} kg (Note: Calculated from its standard gravitational parameter GM = 0.188±0.035 km^{3}/s^{2}.)
- Mean density: 1.03±0.16 g/cm^{3} 1.27 g/cm^{3} (Note: Assuming a diameter of 162 km.)
- Synodic rotation period: 15.679 h (0.6533 d)
- Geometric albedo: 0.0528±0.003
- Spectral type: C
- Absolute magnitude (H): 7.68

194 Prokne is a main-belt asteroid that was discovered by German-American astronomer C. H. F. Peters on March 21, 1879, in Clinton, New York. It was named after Procne, the sister of Philomela in Greek mythology. Stellar occultations by Prokne have been observed twice, in 1984 from Italy and again in 1999 from Iowa (United States).

This asteroid is orbiting the Sun at a distance of 2.62 AU with a moderate eccentricity of 0.238 and an orbital period of 4.23 years. The orbital plane is inclined at an angle of 18.5° to the plane of the ecliptic.

Observations from the W. M. Keck Observatory show the asteroid to be around 151 km across, with a size ratio of 1.13±0.06 between the major and minor axes. For comparison, observations by the IRAS observatory gave a diameter of 164 km. The spectrum matches a classification of a C-type asteroid, indicating it has a primitive carbonaceous composition. Judging from radar data, the near surface solid density of the asteroid is 3.6^{+1.1}_{−0.9} g cm^{−3}.

Based upon a light curve that was generated from photometric observations of this asteroid at Pulkovo Observatory, it has a rotation period of 15.679±0.001 hours and varies in brightness by 0.16±0.02 in magnitude.
