= Dryas (son of Ares) =

Character in Greek mythology

In Greek mythology, Dryas (Ancient Greek: Δρύας, gen.: Δρύαντος, lit. 'from δρῦς oak') was a lord from Calydon who was also one of the famous Calydonian hunters.

== Family ==
Dryas was a son of Ares and a brother of Tereus. But according to Hyginus' Fabulae, he was also called the son of Iapetus ("the piercer"), probably an epithet of Ares.

== Mythology ==
In the account of the Fabulae by Hyginus, Tereus, having heard the prophecy that his son was to be killed by the hand of a relative and falsely believing that it was Dryas whom the oracle indicated, murdered the innocent man (whereas the son was actually murdered by Procne).

"Tereus, son of Mars [Ares], a Thracian . . . thinking that his brother Dryas was plotting his son's death, he killed the innocent man."
