= Tereus (play) =

Tragedy by Sophocles

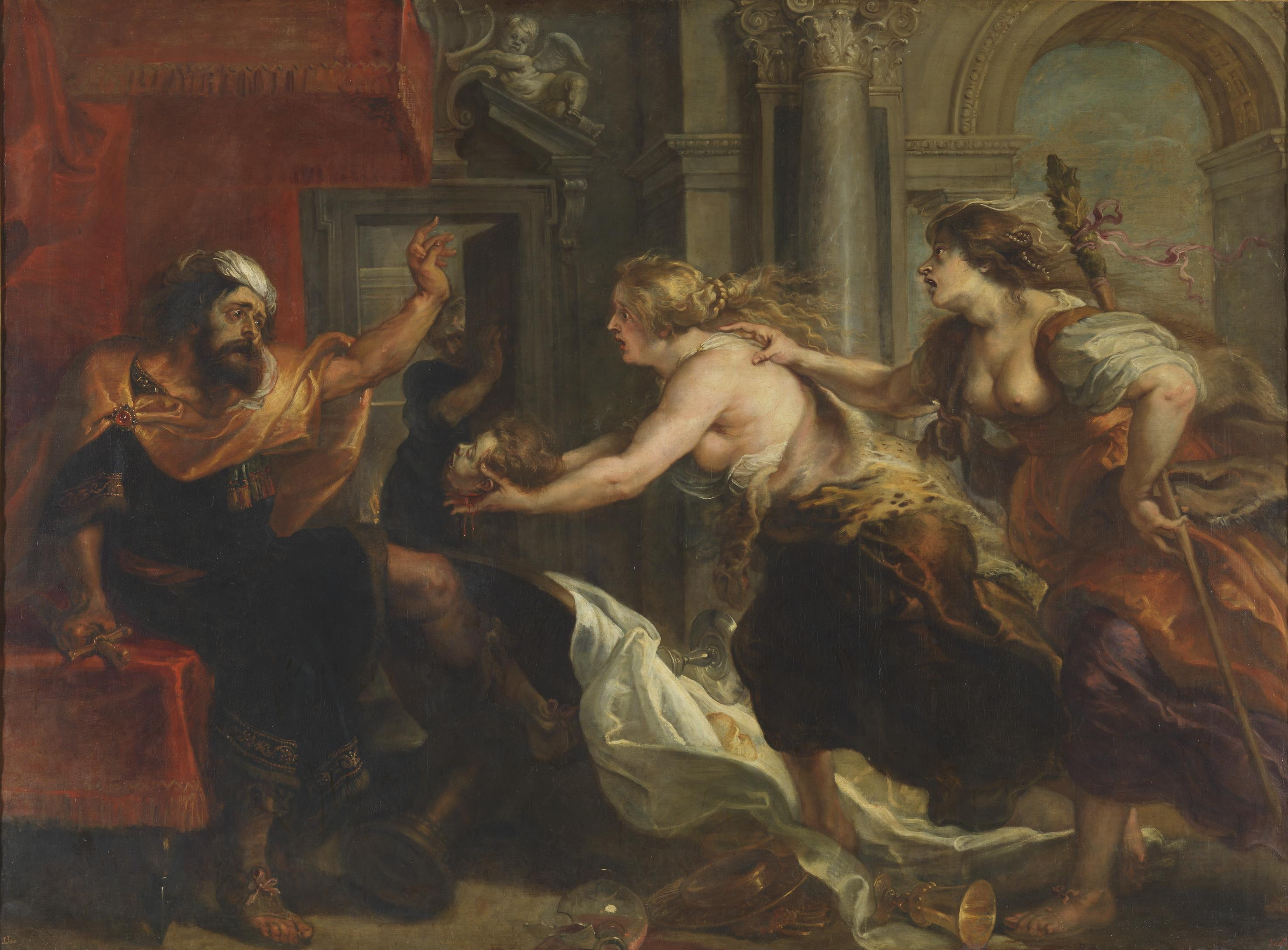
- Tereus being presented with his son's head, painting by Peter Paul Rubens (Prado).
- Original language: Ancient Greek
- Written by: Sophocles
- Chorus: Possibly maidens from Thrace
- Characters: Tereus, Procne, Philomela, at least one other male character, possibly others
- Genre: Athenian tragedy

Premiere
- Date: Before 414 BCE
- Place: Athens

Tereus (Ancient Greek: Τηρεύς, Tēreus) is a lost Greek play by the Athenian poet Sophocles. Although fragments have long been known, the discovery of a synopsis among the Oxyrhynchus Papyri has allowed an attempt at a reconstruction. Although the date that the play was first produced is not known, it is known that it was produced before 414 BCE, because the Greek comedic playwright Aristophanes referenced Tereus in his play The Birds, which was first performed in 414. Thomas B. L. Webster dates the play to near but before 431 BCE, based on circumstantial evidence from a comment Thucydides made in 431 about the need to distinguish between Tereus and the King of Thrace, Teres, which Webster believes was made necessary by the popularity of Sophocles's play around this time causing confusion between the two names. Based on references in The Birds it is also known that another Greek playwright, Philocles, had also written a play on the subject of Tereus, and there is evidence both from The Birds and from a scholiast that Sophocles' play came first.

Some scholars believe that Sophocles' Tereus was influenced by Euripides' Medea, and thus must have been produced after 431. However, this is not certain and any influence may well have been in the opposite direction, with Sophocles' play influencing Euripides. Jenny Marsh believes that Euripides' Medea did come before Sophocles' Tereus, based primarily on a statement in Euripides' chorus "I have heard of only one woman, only one of all that have lived, who put her hand on her own children: Ino." Marsh takes this to imply that as of the time of Medea's production, the myth of Tereus had not yet incorporated the infanticide, as it did in Sophocles' play. Akiko Kiso was the first Japanese scholar to publish on Sophocles. In 1984 Kiso published The Lost Sophocles, which reconsidered fragments of Sophocles' lost works. It included reconstructions of Epigoni and Tereus.

== Plot ==
An hypothesis of the play dating from the 2nd or 3rd century CE was translated by P.J. Parsons in 1974. According to this hypothesis, Tereus, the king of Thrace, was married to Procne, daughter of the Athenian ruler. Tereus and Procne had a son Itys. Procne wanted to see her sister Philomela and asked Tereus to escort her sister to Thrace. During the journey, Tereus fell in lust with Philomela and raped her. In order to prevent her from telling Procne what he had done, he cut out Philomela's tongue. But Philomela wove a tapestry showing what had happened and sent it to Procne. Procne became jealous and, in revenge, killed Itys and served him as a meal to Tereus. The gods turned Procne and Philomela into a nightingale and a swallow to protect them from Tereus, while Tereus was turned into a hoopoe.

In an article in the Classical Quarterly in 2001, David Fitzpatrick summarised some of the challenges facing anyone wanting to reconstruct Sophocles' Tereus from its known fragments at that time. He concluded this article outlining a possible plot of Tereus from the hypothesis and the extant fragments. This plot outline was retained a subsequent publication in 2006 which discusses Sophocles' Tereus in more detail. In Fitzpatrick's reconstruction, the play begins with either a Thracian male servant or herald on behalf of the absent Tereus speaking. This is based on fragment 582, translated by Hugh Lloyd-Jones as "O sun, light greatly honoured by horse-loving Thracians. Procne and the chorus enter. Fitzpatrick believes that the chorus is made of Thracian women sympathetic to Procne. Tereus arrives with the mute Philomela, either lying about Philomela or, as Fitzpatrick believes is more likely, having disguised her as a male servant while claiming that Philomela is dead. The recognition scene likely took place on stage, where Philomela's tapestry reveals the rape and mutilation, and possibly Philomela's identity. Based on fragment 588, in which a character is told not to fear because if he speaks the truth he will "never come to grief," Fitzpatrick believes that a male character confirms what happened to Procne. After a choral interlude, Procne plans her revenge. After Tereus learns of the cannibalism he hunts the sisters. In the reconstruction, the revelation that the women and Tereus were turned into birds is related by a deus ex machina, who Fitzpatrick believes was most likely Apollo. Lloyd-Jones agrees that fragment 589 appears to be a statement from a deus ex machina. This fragment states that Tereus is mad, but the women acted even more madly by using violence to punish him. The fragment concludes by stating that "any mortal who is infuriated by his wrongs and applies a medicine that is worse than the disease is a doctor who does not understand the trouble."

In Kiso's reconstruction, the Prologue has Procne lamenting her loneliness in her marriage far from her home in Athens. This is primarily based on Fragment 583R. A chorus of Thracian elders then arrives to announce Tereus' return from his voyage to bring Philomela to Thrace. In the first episode, Tereus falsely announces Philomela's death. Procne laments her death and Tereus hypocritically consoles her. In the second episode, a maid brings Procne a robe as a gift. The robe has Philomela's message about her fate woven in, i.e., the "voice of the shuttle." After noticing the message exits the stage dressed for a Dionysian festival. In the third episode, the mutilated Philomela, having been released from prison by Procne appears on stage. The seething Procne nonetheless scolds her sister for her sorrow, saying "This is no time for tears, but for the sword, for something stronger than the sword, if you have such a thing." When Itys appears, Procne notices his resemblance to Tereus and decides on her plan to kill and cook him and serve him to his father. In the fourth episode, Procne seduces Tereus into the palace to eat a sacred meal. In the exodus, a nurse or messenger reports the killing and cooking of Itys, Tereus' rage and pursuit of the women and the metamorphosis of the three of them into birds. A divine character concludes the play with Fragment 589R, translated as:

He was foolish but the women went more foolishly too far in avenging him. For a person who, excited in misfortune, fixes on the remedy greater than the disease is a physician who does not understand misfortune.

== Themes ==
One fragment (fragment 583) appears to be a lament by Procne about the status of married women. In an article printed in 2016, which discussed the findings of new contents for this fragment, Patrick Finglass notes “while the fragment does not absolutely prove that Procne is the speaker of fr.583, there is no serious room for doubt on that score”. In the Lloyd-Jones translation, this passage begins "But now I am nothing on my own. But I have often regarded the nature of women in this way, seeing that we amount to nothing." The passage goes on to note that as children living with their father girls "live the happiest life." But then they are "pushed out and sold, away from our paternal gods and from our parents, some to foreign husbands, some to barbarians, some to joyless homes, and some to homes that are opprobrious." But regardless, they must approve and be happy with their lot. Fitzpatrick believes that the tension between husband and wife was one of the themes of the play. The tension between families by marriage and families by birth may also be a theme, as by raping Philomela, Tereus betrays the trust of Procne's and Philomela's father Pandion.

Another familial theme might have been built around the relationship between the sisters. Sophocles used the relationship between sisters in two of his surviving tragedies Antigone (Antigone/Ismene) and Electra (Electra/Chrysothemis). Not only does the plot of Tereus hinge on recognition and reunion between Procne and Philomela, but also the all-female bond of sisterhood outweighs Procne's wife-husband and mother-son obligations.

Another possible theme is the contrast between Athenians and barbarians. Fragment 587 is translated by Lloyd-Jones as stating that "the whole race of barbarians loves money." Athenians believed Thracians to be a "stereotypical barbaric race." Fitzpatrick believes this stereotype was incorporated into Sophocles' play. Thus, the Thracian Tereus commits the barbaric acts of raping a woman entrusted by her father in his care and mutilating her. In addition, the illiterate Thracian Tereus believes that he can silence Philomela by removing her tongue, but the literate native Athenian woman and Philomela foil this through her weaving ability, weaving a tapestry that might have even included words. By using her domestic skills to denounce her rapist, Philomela uses what were considered to be her "best and most 'Athenian' side," rather than needing to use her tongue, which was considered a woman's most dangerous part. By taking revenge on her husband, Procne effectively sides with her Athenian father, which Fitzpatrick interprets as supporting Athens over foreign entities and affirming Athenian imperialism and its patriarchal society.

Kiso noted a contrast between the treatment of the main characters in Tereus compared to the main characters of the extant plays. In the extant plays, the main characters often are destroyed by their refusal to compromise. But Kiso sees in their destruction a "victory for human dignity" in that their courage allows them to follow their idealism and transcend the limits that average humans obey. On the other hand, in Tereus, the actions of Tereus, Procne and Philomela are so excessive that they result in "self-abasement" rather than "self-elevation", as illustrated by their metamorphosis into birds, essentially showing them as dehumanized.

Kiso particularly discussed the contrast between Tereus and an extant play that involves sexual relations and the influence of Aphrodite, The Women of Trachis. In Women of Trachis, Heracles and Deianeira both retain their dignity by committing suicide. On the other hand, Tereus, Procne and Philomela lose their humanity through their vile actions.

One of the extant fragments (fragment 590) appears to include the final lines of the play, given to the chorus. The chorus here remarks that humans cannot know what the future will bring; that is known only to Zeus. The sentiments expressed are similar to those in the final chorus of Sophocles' Ajax and Euripides' Medea. The similarities to Medea also extend to the plot turning on a mother killing her child in order to take revenge on her husband.

== Influences ==
In a Aristophanes The Birds, presented in 414 BCE, a Tereus appears in the form of a hoopoe. Two other characters mock Tereus' beak, and Tereus responds "That's outrageous the way Sophocles treats me – Tereus! – in his tragedies." A second hoopoe appears onstage and Tereus claims that this second hoopoe is the son of Philocles' hoopoe, and that Tereus is the grandfather of this second hoopoe. Since Tereus has claimed to be Sophocles' character, the implication is that Philocles' character derived from Sophocles' Tereus.

The story of Tereus, Procne and Philomela was retold in several later versions, most movingly in Ovid's Metamorphoses, but these versions are believed to be based on Sophocles' play. Although Philomela had lost her tongue and Procne presumably would have lamented her deceased son, Ovid reversed which birds the women were changed into: in Ovid, Philomela was turned into a nightingale and Procne into a swallow.
