= Teuthras (mythology) =

In Greek mythology, Teuthras (Ancient Greek: Τεύθρας, gen.: Τεύθραντος) may refer to two different figures:

- Teuthras, an Athenian prince as son of King Pandion and possibly the naiad Zeuxippe, thus can be considered the brother of Erechtheus, Butes, Philomela and Procne. He was called the father King Thespius of Thespiae. He was said to be the founder of Teuthrone, a town in Laconia.
- Teuthras, the king of Teuthrania and the adopted father of Telephus.
