= Diphros =

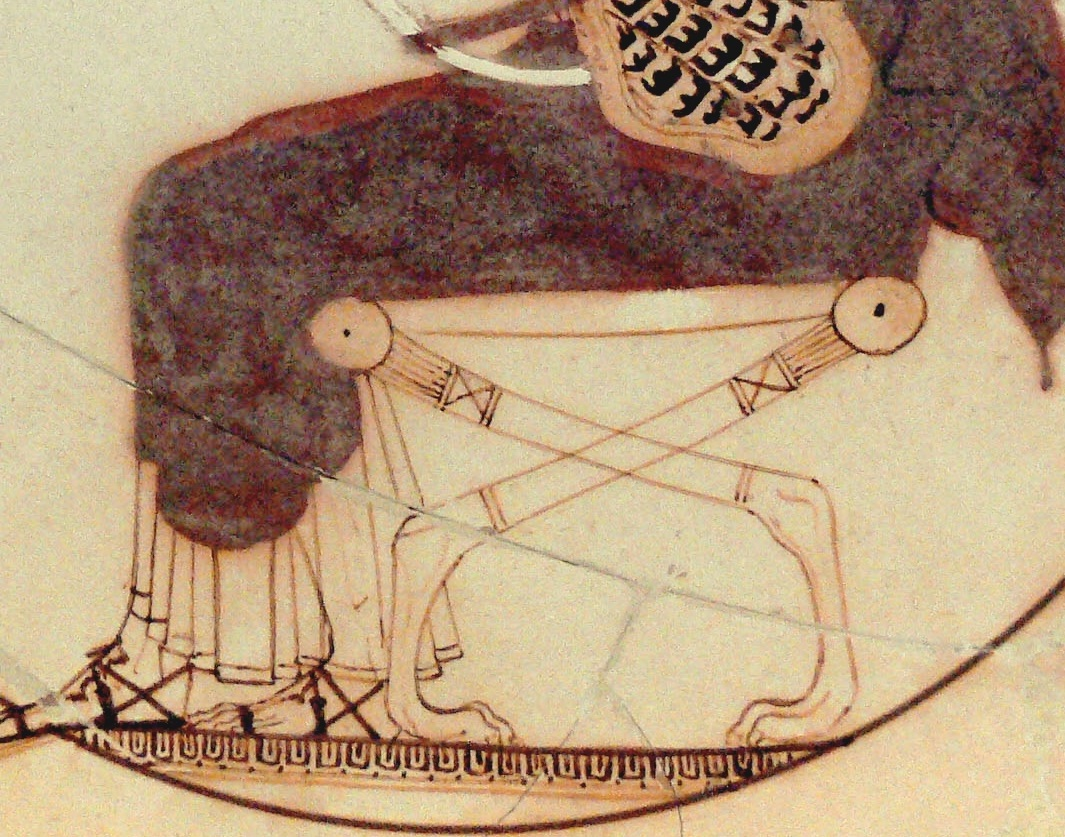
Cylix of Apollo (detail).

Diphros (Greek: Δίφρος) was an Ancient Greek stool without back and with four turned legs. It was easily transportable and so in common use. Gods are shown sitting on diphroi on the Parthenon frieze; women used them in their home. The foldable diphros was called δίφρος ὀκλαδίας diphros okladias. Diphros was also called the saddle of chariot-board, on which two could stand, the driver ἡνίοχος heniochos and the combatant παραιβάτης paraibatês. These objects are only part of the larger body of ancient furniture attested to in texts and images.
