= Itys =

Greek mythological figure

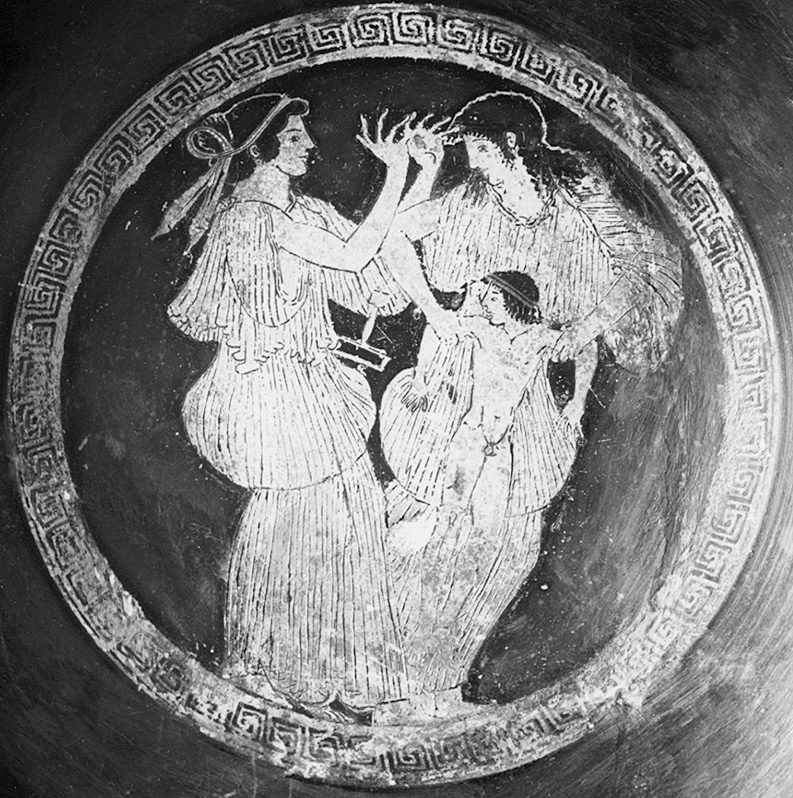
Athenian wine cup, circa 480 BC, depicting Philomela and Procne preparing to kill Itys (Louvre, Paris)

In Greek mythology, Itys (Ancient Greek: Ἴτυς, romanized: Ítus) is a minor mythological Thracian character, the son of Tereus, a king of Thrace, by his Athenian wife Procne. Itys was murdered by his own mother and aunt and served to be consumed during dinner by his father, as part of a revenge plan against Tereus for assaulting and raping the maiden Philomela, Procne's sister.

Following those events, Itys' immediate family were all transformed into birds afterwards, and in some versions he too joins them in the avian kingdom. Itys' story survives in several accounts, the most extensive and famous among them being Ovid's Metamorphoses. His myth had been known since at least the sixth century BC, though myths that would eventually shape the standard tale go back even further.

== Family ==
Itys was the son of Procne, a princess of Athens, and Tereus, a Thracian king, thus nephew to Philomela. Through his father he was a grandson of the god of war Ares.

== Mythology ==
=== Standard tale ===
Itys was born and raised in Thrace following his parents' ill-omened marriage. When he was still a child, his father Tereus raped Itys' maternal aunt Philomela while escorting her to Thrace on her way to visit her sister Procne. Tereus cut Philomela's tongue so she could never be able to tell anyone her story, and abandoned her away from his palace. Philomela however managed to weave a tapestry or robe with her story and sent it to her sister. After receiving it, Procne rescued her sister and planned revenge. In rage she slew Itys, seeing him as but an image of his father, boiled him and served him as a meal to Tereus.

After Tereus finished his meal, the two sisters presented him with the disembodied head of Itys. Once he realised what had happened, Tereus hunted down the two sisters, who prayed to the gods. All three were transformed into birds. Depending on the myth's version, either Philomela or Procne is turned into either the silent swallow or the singing nightingale (Note: Versions vary on which sister became which bird.) which continued to mourn her slain son in her new life. "Itys" was also the name for the plaintive cry of the nightingale.

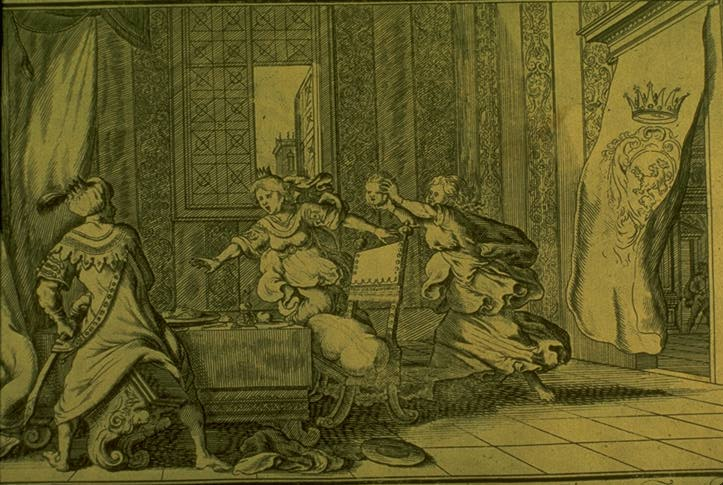
Philomela and Procne show the severed head of Itys to Tereus, engraved by Baur for a 1703 edition of Metamorphoses.

=== Other versions ===
Pausanias on the other hand writes that Tereus was so remorseful for his actions against Philomela and Itys's fate at the hands of the women (the nature of which is not described in clear detail) that he killed himself. Eustathius's version of the story has the sisters reversed, so that Philomela married Tereus and became the mother of Itys.

In some versions, Itys himself was transformed into a bird like the rest of his family, specifically a pheasant, to be admired for its fine plumage. This element is not present in Ovid and most authors, who instead have Itys unceremoniously killed and eaten.

In some texts, Itys is called Itylus instead, another mythological bird who was killed by his mother Aëdon, queen of Thebes and wife of Zethus, who then transformed into a nightingale. In one related variation of the myth, Itys' mother is an Ephesian woman called Aëdon and his father Polytechnus from Colophon.

== Development ==
The fullest surviving account of Itys' tale comes to us via the Roman poet Ovid and his narrative poem the Metamorphoses; however, the myth itself is much older, and Ovid's telling was largely influenced by Sophocles's now lost tragedy Tereus. Scholar Jenny Marsh theorized that Sophocles must have borrowed certain elements of the plot from Euripides's drama Medea.

She argues that the element of the enraged wife killing her child in an act of revenge against her husband's actions was directly borrowed from Euripides and incorporated into his tragedy. If accurate, that would mean that the infanticide of Itys did not appear in the myth of Procne and Philomela until Sophocles. Tellingly, the chorus in Medea state that they know only of one woman sans Medea herself that killed her children (Ino) without taking Procne into account.

== See also ==
- Iphigenia
- Harpalyce
- Lycaon
- Procne and Itys (sculpture)
- Pelops
- Thyestes

== Bibliography ==
- Antoninus Liberalis, The Metamorphoses of Antoninus Liberalis translated by Francis Celoria (Routledge 1992). Online version at the Topos Text Project.
- Apollodorus (1921). The Library. Loeb Classical Library 121. Vol. I: Books 1-3.9. Translated by James G. Frazer. Cambridge, MA: Harvard University Press.
- Euripides (1994). Cyclops. Alcestis. Medea. Loeb Classical Library 12. Translated by David Kovacs. Cambridge, MA: Harvard University Press.
- Maurus Servius Honoratus, In Vergilii carmina comentarii. Servii Grammatici qui feruntur in Vergilii carmina commentarii; recensuerunt Georgius Thilo et Hermannus Hagen. Georgius Thilo. Leipzig. B. G. Teubner. 1881. Online version at the Perseus Digital Library.
- Ovid (1916). Metamorphoses. Loeb Classical Library 42. Vol. I: Books 1-8. Translated by Frank Justus Miller, revised by G. P. Goold. Cambridge, MA: Harvard University Press.
- Pausanias (1918). Description of Greece. Loeb Classical Library 93. Vol. I: Books 1-2 (Attica and Corinth). Translated by W. H. S. Jones. Cambridge MA: Harvard University Press.
