= Philomela =

Minor figure in Greek mythology

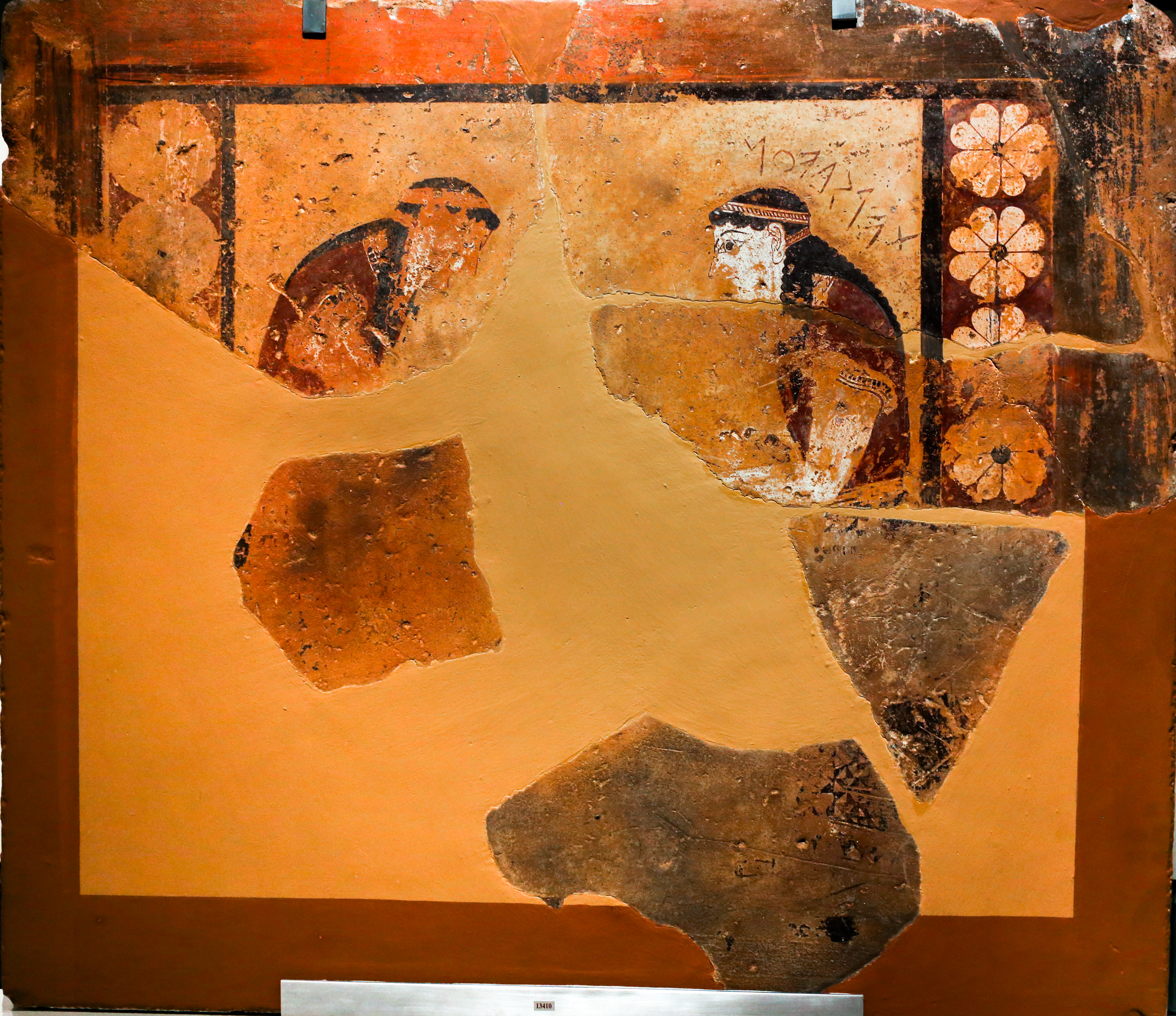
Procne and Philomela carving up Itys, Temple of Apollo, Thermos, terracotta metope, c. 630–625 BC

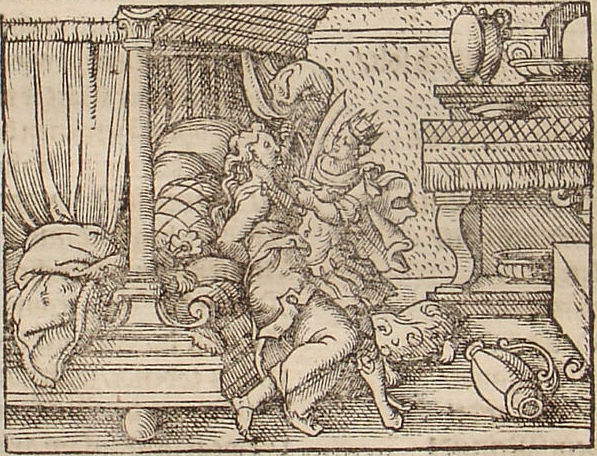
"The Rape of Philomela by Tereus", engraved by Virgil Solis for a 1562 edition of Ovid's Metamorphoses (Book VI, 519–562)

Philomela (/ˌfɪləˈmiːlə/; Ancient Greek: Φιλομήλα, romanized: Philomḗla, lit. 'lover of song' or 'lover of melody') or Philomel (/ˈfɪləˌmɛl/; Ancient Greek: Φιλομήλη, romanized: Philomḗlē) is a minor figure in Greek mythology who is frequently invoked as a direct and figurative symbol in literary and artistic works in the Western canon.

== Family ==
Philomela was the younger of two daughters of Pandion I, King of Athens, and the naiad Zeuxippe. Her sister, Procne, was the wife of King Tereus of Thrace. Philomela's other siblings were Erechtheus, Butes and possibly Teuthras.

== Mythology ==
While the myth has several variations, the general depiction is that Philomela, after being raped and mutilated by her sister's husband, Tereus, obtains her revenge and is transformed into a bird, either a swallow in Greek versions or a nightingale (Luscinia megarhynchos), a bird renowned for its song, in Roman ones. Because of the violence associated with the myth, the song of the nightingale is often depicted or interpreted as a sorrowful lament. In nature, the female nightingale is mute, and only the male of the species sings.

Ovid and other writers have made the association that the etymology of her name was "lover of song", derived from the Greek φιλο- and μέλος ("song") instead of μῆλον ("fruit" or "sheep"), which means "lover of fruit", "lover of apples", or "lover of sheep".

The most complete and extant rendering of the story of Philomela, Procne, and Tereus can be found in Book VI of the Metamorphoses of the Roman poet Ovid (Publius Ovidius Naso) (43 BC – 17/18 AD), where the story reaches its full development during antiquity. It is likely that Ovid relied upon Greek and Latin sources that were available in his era such as the Bibliotheca of Pseudo-Apollodorus (2nd century BC), or sources that are no longer extant or exist today only in fragments—especially Sophocles' tragic drama Tereus (5th century BC).

According to Ovid, in the fifth year of Procne's marriage to Tereus, King of Thrace and son of Ares, she asked her husband to "Let me at Athens my dear sister see / Or let her come to Thrace, and visit me." Tereus agreed to travel to Athens and escort her sister, Philomela, to Thrace. King Pandion of Athens, the father of Philomela and Procne, was apprehensive about letting his one remaining daughter leave his home and protection and asks Tereus to protect her as if he were her father. Tereus agrees. However, Tereus lusted for Philomela when he first saw her, and that lust grew during the course of the return voyage to Thrace.

"The Rape of Philomela by Tereus", book 6, plate 59. Engraved by Johann Wilhelm Baur for a 1703 edition of Ovid's Metamorphoses

Arriving in Thrace, he forced her to a cabin or lodge in the woods and raped her. After the assault, Tereus threatened her and advised her to keep silent. Philomela was defiant and angered Tereus. In his rage, he cut out her tongue and abandoned her in the cabin. In Ovid's Metamorphoses Philomela's defiant speech is rendered (in an 18th-century English translation) as:

Still my revenge shall take its proper time,
And suit the baseness of your hellish crime.
My self, abandon'd, and devoid of shame,
Thro' the wide world your actions will proclaim;
Or tho' I'm prison'd in this lonely den,
Obscur'd, and bury'd from the sight of men,
My mournful voice the pitying rocks shall move,
And my complainings echo thro' the grove.
Hear me, o Heav'n! and, if a God be there,
Let him regard me, and accept my pray'r.

Philomela was unable to speak because of her injuries, and so she wove a tapestry (or a robe) that told her story and sent it to Procne. Procne was incensed by her husband's actions and killed their son Itys (or "Itylus") in revenge. She boiled Itys and served him as a meal for Tereus. After Tereus ate Itys, the sisters presented Tereus with the severed head of his son, revealing the conspiracy. Tereus grabbed an axe and chased the sisters intending to kill them. They fled but were almost overtaken by Tereus at Daulia in Phocis. The sisters desperately prayed to the gods to be turned into birds and escape Tereus' rage and vengeance. The gods transformed the two sisters into a swallow and a nightingale. Although the earlier Greek accounts say that Procne became the nightingale, and the tongueless Philomela the silent swallow (which are more consistent with the facts of the myth), Roman authors tended to swap the bird metamorphosis of the two sisters. Ovid himself stayed neutral on the matter, not naming which sister became which bird. Subsequently, the gods transformed Tereus into a hoopoe.

=== Variations on the myth ===
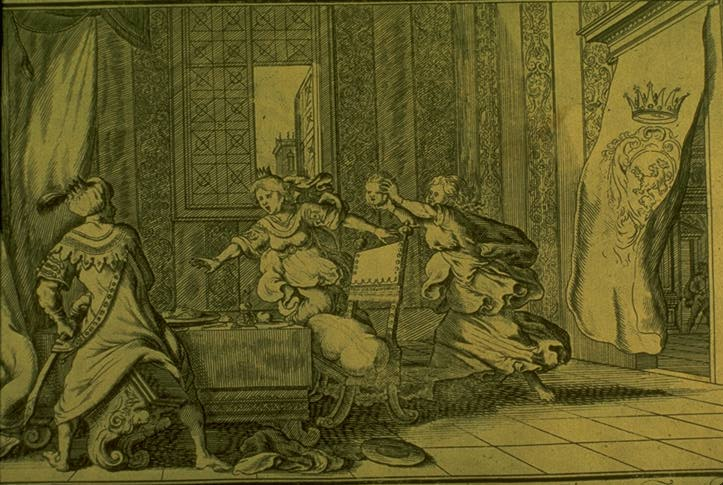
Philomela and Procne showing the severed head of Itys to his father Tereus, engraved by Baur for a 1703 edition of Ovid's Metamorphoses (Book VI:621–647)

It is typical for myths from antiquity to have been altered over the passage of time or for competing variations of the myth to emerge. With the story of Philomela, most of the variations concern which sister became the nightingale or the swallow, and into what type of bird Tereus was transformed. In Greek texts like Achilles Tatius and the Bibliotheca of Pseudo-Apollodorus, Philomela is transformed into a swallow and Procne into a nightingale, but in Latin texts Philomela is the nightingale and Procne is the swallow. The description of Tereus as an "epops" has generally been translated as a hoopoe (scientific name: Upupa epops). Since many of the earlier sources are no longer extant, or remain only in fragments, Ovid's version of the myth has been the most lasting and influential upon later works.

Early Greek sources have it that Philomela was turned into a swallow, which has no song; Procne was turned into a nightingale, singing a beautiful but sad song in remorse. Later sources, among them Hyginus and in modern literature the English romantic poets like Keats write that although she was tongueless, Philomela was turned into a nightingale, and Procne into a swallow. Eustathius' version of the story has the sisters reversed, so that Philomela married Tereus and that Tereus lusted after Procne.

It is salient to note that in taxonomy and binomial nomenclature, the genus name of the martins (the larger-bodied among swallow genera) is Progne, a Latinized form of Procne. Other related genera named after the myth include the Crag Martins Ptyonoprogne, and Saw-wings Psalidoprocne. Coincidentally, although most of the depictions of the nightingale and its song in art and literature are of female nightingales, the female of the species does not sing—it is the male of the species who sings its characteristic song.

In an early account, Sophocles wrote that Tereus was turned into a large-beaked bird whom some scholars translate as a hawk while a number of retellings and other works (including Aristophanes' ancient comedy The Birds) hold that Tereus was instead changed into a hoopoe. Various later translations of Ovid state that Tereus was transformed into other birds than the hawk and hoopoe, including references by Dryden and Gower to the lapwing.

Two swallows on the Minoan Spring Fresco from Akrotiri, now in the National Archaeological Museum of Greece.

Several writers omit key details of the story. According to Pausanias, Tereus was so remorseful for his actions against Philomela and Itys (the nature of the actions is not described) that he kills himself. Then two birds appear as the women lament his death. Many later sources omit Tereus' tongue-cutting mutilation of Philomela altogether.

According to Thucydides, Tereus was not King of Thrace, but rather from Daulia in Phocis, a city inhabited by Thracians. Thucydides cites as proof of this that poets who mention the nightingale refer to it as a "Daulian bird". It is thought that Thucydides commented on the myth in his famous work on the Peloponnesian War because Sophocles' play confused the mythical Tereus with contemporary ruler Teres I of Thrace.

In a variation of the myth set in Asia Minor, Philomela is called Chelidon ("swallow") and her sister Aëdon ("nightingale").

=== Elements borrowed from other myths and stories ===
The story of Philomela, Procne, and Tereus is largely influenced by Sophocles' lost tragedy Tereus. Scholar Jenny Marsh claims Sophocles borrowed certain plot elements from Euripides' drama Medea—notably a wife killing her child in an act of revenge against her husband—and incorporated them in his tragedy Tereus. She implies that the infanticide of Itys did not appear in the Tereus myth until Sophocles' play and that it was introduced because of what was borrowed from Euripides.

It is possible that social and political themes have woven their way into the story as a contrast between Athenians who believed themselves to be the hegemonic power in Greece and the more civilized of the Greek peoples, and the Thracians who were considered to be a "barbaric race". It is possible that these elements were woven into Sophocles' play Tereus and other works of the period.

== Appearances in the Western canon ==
The material of the Philomela myth has been used in various creative works—artistic and literary—for the past 2,500 years. Over the centuries, the myth has been associated with the image of the nightingale and its song described as both exceedingly beautiful and sorrowful. The continued use of the image in artistic, literary, and musical works has reinforced this association.

=== From antiquity and the influence of Ovid ===
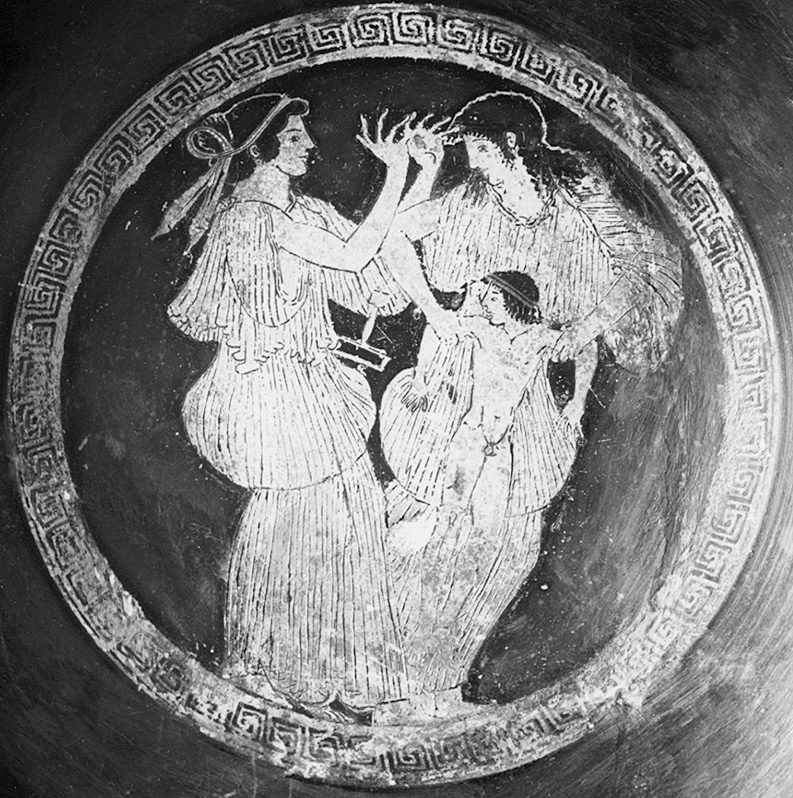
Attic wine cup, circa 490 BC, depicting Philomela and Procne preparing to kill Itys. (Louvre, Paris)

Beginning with Homer's Odyssey, ancient dramatists and poets evoked the story of Philomela and the nightingale in their works. Most notably, it was the core of the tragedy Tereus by Sophocles (lost, extant only in fragments) and later in a set of plays by Philocles, the nephew of the great playwright Aeschylus. In Aeschylus's Agamemnon, the prophetess Cassandra has a visionary premonition of her own death in which she mentioned the nightingale and Itys, lamenting:

Ah for thy fate, O shrill-voiced nightingale!
Some solace for thy woes did Heaven afford,
Clothed thee with soft brown plumes, and life apart from wail(ing)—

In his Poetics, Aristotle points to the "voice of the shuttle" in Sophocles′ tragedy Tereus as an example of a poetic device that aids in the "recognition"—the change from ignorance to knowledge—of what has happened earlier in the plot. Such a device, according to Aristotle, is ″contrived″ by the poet, and thus is "inartistic". The connection between the nightingale's song and poetry is evoked by Aristophanes in his comedy The Birds and in the poetry of Callimachus. Roman poet Virgil compares the mourning of Orpheus for Eurydice to the "lament of the nightingale".

While Ovid's retelling of the myth is the more famous version of the story, he had several ancient sources on which to rely before he finished the Metamorphoses in A.D. 8. Many of these sources were doubtless available to Ovid during his lifetime but have been lost or come to us at present only in fragments. In his version, Ovid recast and combined many elements from these ancient sources. Because his is the most complete, lasting version of the myth, it is the basis for many later works.

=== In the Middle Ages ===
An Old French retelling of the myth in romance form, Philomena, is attributed to the 12th-century French trouvère (troubadour in Occitan) Chrétien de Troyes. This version is reproduced in the Ovide moralisé, a 14th-century French retelling of the Metamorphoses with accompanying allegorical commentary. A brief proem added to the beginning of the tale credits "Crestiens" with its composition. Though this attribution was contested, scholars currently working in the field accept Chrétien as the author of the Old French Philomena.

In England, Geoffrey Chaucer retold the story partially in The Legend of Good Women, cutting out the second half in which Procne and Philomla kill Itys. He also makes allusions to the nightingale twice in his epic poem Troilus and Criseyde. John Gower retold the tale in its entirety in Book V of his Confessio Amantis.

The nightingale and its connection to Philomela also appear in the poetry of Dante and Petrarch. References to Philomela are common in the motets of the ars nova, ars subtilior, and ars mutandi musical eras of the late fourteenth and early fifteenth centuries.

=== In Elizabethan and Jacobean England ===
Throughout the late Renaissance and Elizabethan eras, the image of Philomela and the nightingale incorporated elements of mourning and beauty after being subjected to an act of violence. In his long poem "The Steele Glas" (1576), poet George Gascoigne (1535–1577) depicts "Philomel" as the representative of poetry (Poesys), her sister Progne as satire (Satyra), and Tereus as "vayne Delight". The characterization of Philomela and the nightingale was that of a woman choosing to exercise her will in recovering her voice and resisting those forces which attempts to silence her. Critics have pointed to Gascoigne's use of the Philomela myth as a personal appeal and that he was fighting in verse a battle with his enemies who violently opposed his poems. In Gascoigne's poem "The complaynt of Philomene" (1576), the myth is employed to depict punishment and control.

In "The Nymph's Reply to the Shepherd", Sir Walter Raleigh (1554–1618) relays consolation regarding the nymph's harsh rejection of the shepherd's romantic advances in the spirit of "time heals all wounds" by citing in the second stanza (among several examples) that eventually, with the passage of time, Philomel would become "dumb" to her own pain and that her attention would be drawn away from the pain by the events of life to come.

In Sir Philip Sidney's (1554–1586) courtly love poem "The Nightingale", the narrator, who is in love with a woman he cannot have, compares his own romantic situation to that of Philomela's plight and claims that he has more reason to be sad. However, recent literary criticism has labelled this claim as sexist and an unfortunate marginalization of the traumatic rape of Philomela. Sidney argues that the rape was an "excess of love" and less severe than being deprived of love as attested by the line, "Since wanting is more woe than too much having."

Playwright and poet William Shakespeare (1564–1616) makes frequent use of the Philomela myth—most notably in his tragedy Titus Andronicus (c. 1588–1593) where characters directly reference Tereus and Philomela in commenting on rape and mutilation of Lavinia by Aaron, Chiron, and Demetrius. Prominent allusions to Philomela also occur in the depiction of Lucrece in The Rape of Lucrece, in the depiction of Imogen in Cymbeline, and in Titania's lullaby in A Midsummer Night's Dream where she asks Philomel to "sing in our sweet lullaby". In Sonnet 102, Shakespeare addresses his lover (the "fair youth") and compares his love poetry to the song of the nightingale, noting that "her mournful hymns did hush the night" (line 10), and that as a poet would "hold his tongue" (line 13) in deference to the more beautiful nightingale's song so that he "not dull you with my song" (line 14). Emilia Lanier (1569–1645), a poet who is considered by some scholars to be the woman referred to in the poetry of William Shakespeare as "Dark Lady", makes several references to Philomela in her patronage poem "The Description of Cookeham" in Salve Deus Rex Judaeorum (1611). Lanier's poem, dedicated to Margaret Clifford, Countess of Cumberland and her daughter Lady Anne Clifford refers to Philomela's "sundry layes"(line 31) and later to her "mournful ditty" (line 189).

The image of the nightingale appears frequently in poetry of the period with it and its song described by poets as an example of "joyance" and gaiety or as an example of melancholy, sad, sorrowful, and mourning. However, many use the nightingale as a symbol of sorrow but without a direct reference to the Philomela myth.

=== In Classical and Romantic works ===
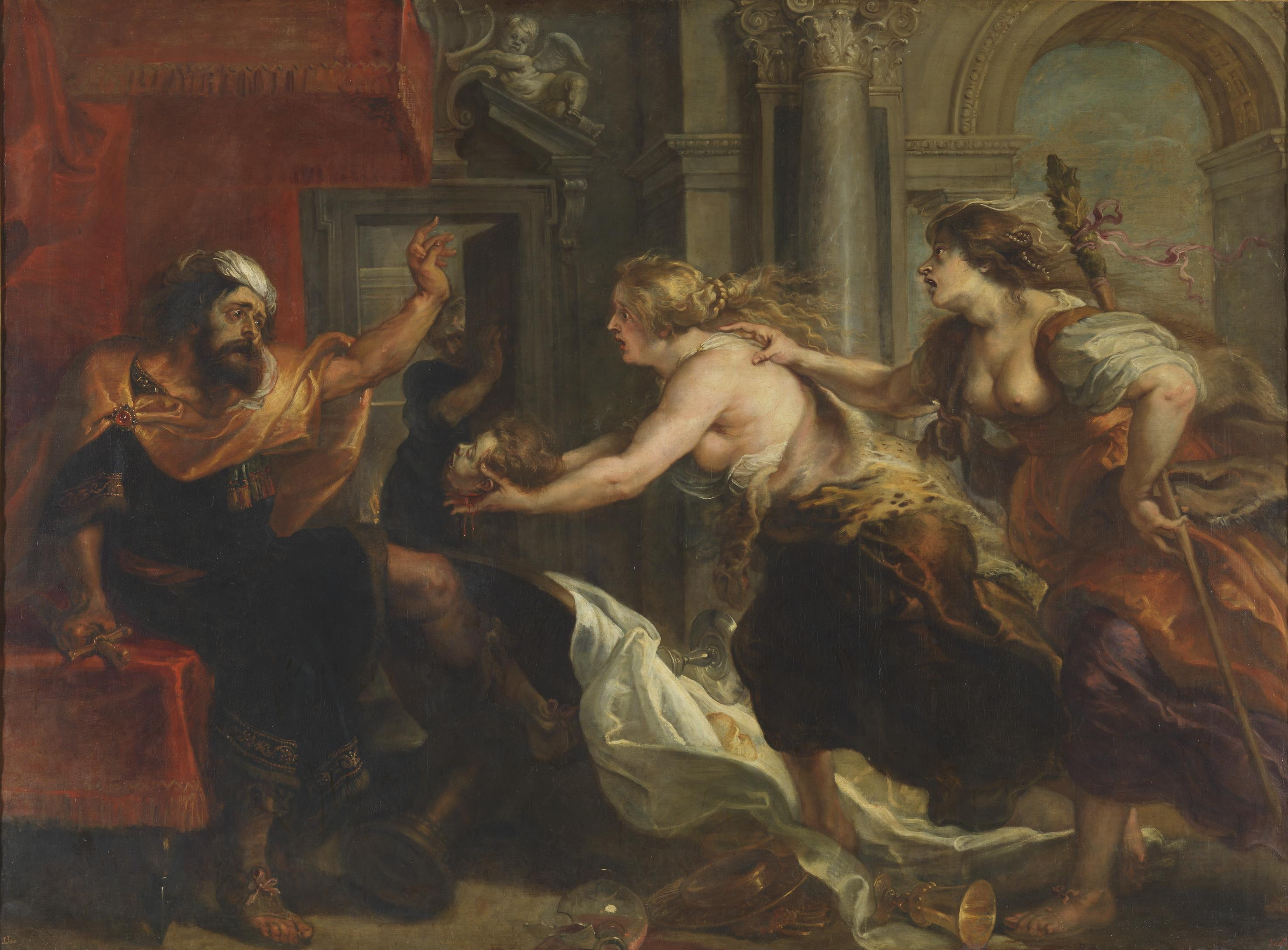
Tereus Confronted with the Head of his Son Itylus (oil on canvas, painted 1636–1638), one of the late works of Flemish Baroque painter Peter Paul Rubens (1577–1640) (Prado, Madrid)

Poets in the Romantic Era recast the myth and adapted the image of the nightingale with its song to be a poet and "master of a superior art that could inspire the human poet". For some romantic poets, the nightingale even began to take on qualities of the muse. John Keats (1795–1821), in "Ode to a Nightingale" (1819) idealizes the nightingale as a poet who has achieved the poetry that Keats himself longs to write. Keats directly employs the Philomel myth in "The Eve of St. Agnes" (1820) where the rape of Madeline by Porphyro mirrors the rape of Philomela by Tereus. Keats' contemporary, poet Percy Bysshe Shelley (1792–1822) invoked a similar image of the nightingale, writing in his A Defence of Poetry that "a poet is a nightingale who sits in darkness and sings to cheer its own solitude with sweet sounds; his auditors are as men entranced by the melody of an unseen musician, who feel that they are moved and softened, yet know not whence or why."

In France, Philomèle was an operatic stage production of the story, produced by Louis Lacoste during the reign of Louis XIV.

First published in the collection Lyrical Ballads, "The Nightingale" (1798) is an effort by Samuel Taylor Coleridge (1772–1834) to move away from associations that the nightingale's song was one of melancholy and identified it with the joyous experience of nature. He remarked that "in nature there is nothing melancholy", (line 15) expressing hope "we may not thus profane / Nature's sweet voices, always full of love / And joyance!" (lines 40–42).

At the poem's conclusion, Coleridge writes of a father taking his crying son outside in the night:

And he beheld the moon, and, hushed at once,
Suspends his sobs, and laughs most silently,
While his fair eyes, that swam with undropped tears,'
Did glitter in the yellow moon-beam! Well!—
It is a father's tale: But if that Heaven
Should give me life, his childhood shall grow up
Familiar with these songs, that with the night
He may associate joy.—

Coleridge and his friend William Wordsworth (1770–1850), who called the nightingale a "fiery heart", depicted it "as an instance of natural poetic creation", and the "voice of nature".

Other notable mentions include:

- In William Makepeace Thackeray's 1847–1848 serial Vanity Fair, Becky Sharp performs charades of Clytemnestra (kingslayer) and Philomela (the ravished mute of king, who prompted his slaying) before the Prince Regent of England. Further, her performance of Philomela is styled after the play from the era of Louis XIV, alluding to the possibility of her becoming another Marquise de Maintenon.
- In the poem "Philomela" (1853) by English poet Matthew Arnold (1822–1888), the poet asks upon hearing the crying of a fleeing nightingale if it can find peace and healing in the English countryside far away from Greece, although lamenting its pain and passion "eternal".
- In his 1881 poem "The Burden of Itys", Oscar Wilde describes Itys as the symbol of Greek art and pleasure is contrasted with Christ. The landscape of Greece is also compared to the landscape of England, specifically Kent and Oxford.
- Algernon Charles Swinburne (1837–1909) wrote a poem called "Itylus" based on the story in which Philomela and Procne, after being transformed into the nightingale and swallow, ask when they will be able to forget the grief of having slain Itylus—the answer being they will forget when the world ends. He also wrote the lyrical tragedy Erechtheus (1876) which concerns Philomela's brother.
- English poet Ann Yearsley (1753–1806) in lamenting the sufferings of African slaves invokes the myth and challenges that her song "shall teach sad Philomel a louder note," in her abolitionist poem "A Poem on the Inhumanity of the Slave-Trade" (1788)
- In "A la Juventud Filipina", Filipino national hero José Rizal (1861–1896), used the image of Philomel as inspiration for young Filipinos to use their voices to speak of Spanish injustice and colonial oppression.

=== In modern works ===
The Philomela myth is perpetuated largely through its appearance as a powerful device in poetry. In the 20th century, American-British poet T. S. Eliot (1888–1965) directly referenced the myth in his most famous poem, The Waste Land (1922), where he describes,

The change of Philomel, by the barbarous king
So rudely forced; yet there the nightingale
Filled all the desert with inviolable voice
And still she cried, and still the world pursues,
"Jug Jug" to dirty ears.

Eliot employs the myth to depict themes of sorrow, pain, and that the only recovery or regeneration possible is through revenge. Several of these mentions reference other poets' renderings of the myth, including those of Ovid and Gascoigne. Eliot's references to the nightingales singing by the convent in "Sweeney and the Nightingales" (1919–1920) is a direct reference to the murder of Agamemnon in the tragedy by Aeschylus—wherein the Greek dramatist directly evoked the Philomela myth. The poem describes Sweeney as a brute and that two women in the poem are conspiring against him for his mistreatment of them. This mirrors not only the elements of Agamemnon's death in Aeschylus' play but the sister's revenge against Tereus in the myth.

In the poem "To the Nightingale", Argentine poet and fabulist, Jorge Luis Borges (1899–1986), compares his efforts as a poet to the bird's lament though never having heard it. He describes its song as "encrusted with mythology" and that the evolution of the myth has distorted it—that the opinions of other poets and writers have kept both poet and reader from actually hearing the original sound and knowing the essence of the song.

Several artists have applied Ovid's account to new translations or reworkings, or adapted the story for the stage. Leonard Quirino notes that the plot of Tennessee Williams's play A Streetcar Named Desire "is modeled on the legend of Tereus".

British poet Ted Hughes (1930–1998) used the myth in his 1997 work Tales from Ovid (1997) which was a loose translation and retelling of twenty-four tales from Ovid's Metamorphoses. Both Israeli dramatist Hanoch Levin (in The Great Whore of Babylon) and English playwright Joanna Laurens (in The Three Birds) wrote plays based on the story. The story was adapted into an opera by Scottish composer James Dillon in 2004, and a 1964 vocal composition by American composer Milton Babbitt with text by John Hollander.

The reference to Philomela also exists in the name of a Bengali music troupe in Calcutta, India, called Nagar Philomel (The city that loves song), formed in 1983.

Several female writers have used the Philomela myth in exploring the subject of rape, women and power (empowerment) and feminist themes, including novelist Margaret Atwood in her novella "Nightingale" published in The Tent (2006), Emma Tennant in her story "Philomela", Jeannine Hall Gailey who uses the myth in several poems published in Becoming the Villainess (2006), and Timberlake Wertenbaker in her play The Love of the Nightingale (1989) (later adapted into an opera of the same name composed by Richard Mills). Canadian playwright Erin Shields adapted the myth in her play If We Were Birds (2011), which won the 2011 Governor General's Award for Drama. More recently, poet and author Melissa Studdard brought new life to the myth in her poem "Philomela's tongue says" (2019), published in Poetry magazine's May 2019 edition.

== See also ==
- Child cannibalism
- List of rape victims from ancient history and mythology
- 196 Philomela, main-belt asteroid
