= Tereus =

Thracian king

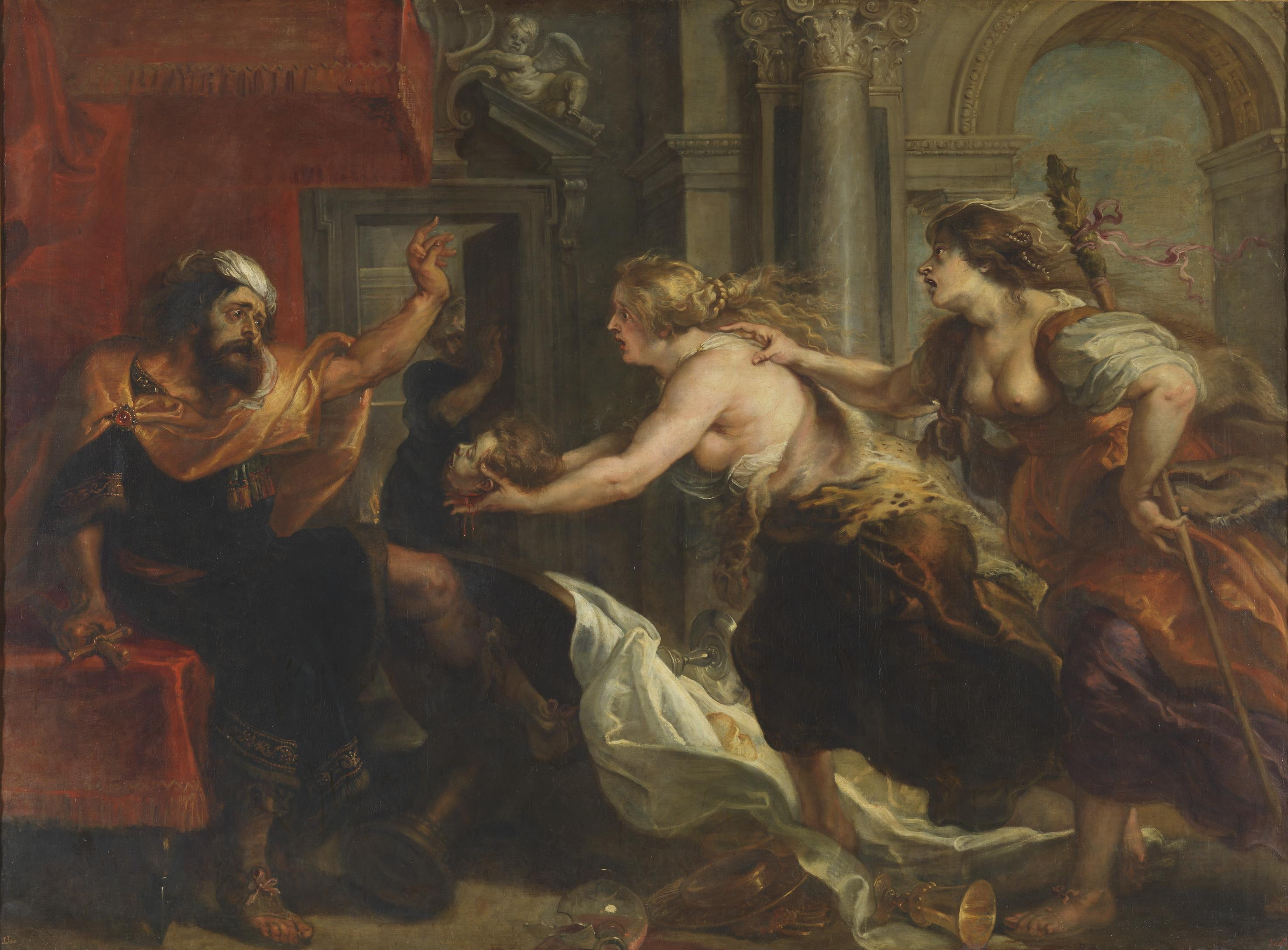
Rubens: Tereus Confronted with the Head of his Son Itys, 1636–38

In Greek mythology, Tereus (/ˈtɛriəs, ˈtɪərjuːs/; Ancient Greek: Τηρεύς, romanized: Tēreús) was a Thracian king, the son of Ares and the naiad Bistonis. He was the brother of Dryas. Tereus was the husband of the Athenian princess Procne and the father of Itys.

== Mythology ==
When Tereus desired his wife's sister, Philomela, he came to Athens to his father-in-law Pandion to ask for his other daughter in marriage, stating that Procne had died. Pandion granted him the favour, and sent Philomela and guards along with her. But Tereus threw the guards into the sea, and finding Philomela on a mountain, forced himself upon her. He then cut her tongue out and held her captive so she could never tell anyone. After he returned to Thrace, Tereus gave Philomela to King Lynceus and told his wife that her sister had died. Philomela wove letters in a tapestry depicting Tereus's crime and sent it secretly to Procne. Lynceus' wife Lathusa, who was a friend of Procne, at once sent Philomela to her.

When Procne recognized her sister and knew the impious deed of Tereus, the two planned to return the favour to the king. Meanwhile, it was revealed to Tereus by prodigies that death by a relative's hand was coming to his son Itys. When he heard this, thinking that his brother Dryas was plotting his son's death, he killed the innocent man. Procne, however, killed Itys, her son by Tereus, served his flesh in a meal at his father's table in revenge, and fled with her sister.

When Tereus learned of her crime, he pursued the sisters and tried to kill them, but all three were changed by the Olympian Gods into birds out of pity: Tereus became a hoopoe or a hawk; Procne became the swallow whose song is a song of mourning for the loss of her child; Philomela became the nightingale. Incidentally, the female nightingale has no song. (Hyginus, Fabulae, 45).

A very similar story was told about Polytechnus.

== Other usage ==
Tereus was also a common given name among Thracians.

The Attic playwrights Sophocles and Philocles both wrote plays entitled Tereus on the subject of the story of Tereus. The popularity of Sophocles' play caused a confusion among Athenians between Tereus and Teres, a Thracian king and father of the king with whom Athenians made an alliance in 431 BC.

The transformed Tereus is a character in The Birds by Aristophanes.

John Gower includes a version of the story in his poem The Lover's Confession during which a Confessor named Genius recounts the story to the penitent Amans to educate and reform Amans' moral character.

Shakespeare refers to Tereus in Titus Andronicus, after Chiron and Demetrius have raped Lavinia and cut out her tongue and also both her hands. He also makes reference to Tereus in Cymbeline, when Iachimo spies upon the sleeping Imogen to gather false evidence so he can persuade Posthumus he has seduced her.

== Modern adaptations ==
- The Love of the Nightingale, play by Timberlake Wertenbaker
- The Love of the Nightingale, opera by Richard Mills to a libretto from the above play

== See also ==
- Child cannibalism

Other fathers who were tricked into consuming their children:

- Thyestes
- Demophon of Elaeus
- Polytechnus
