= Pandion I =

Legendary king of Athens

In Greek mythology, Pandion I (/pænˈdaɪɒn/; Ancient Greek: Πανδίων, romanized: Pandíōn, lit. 'all-divine') was a legendary King of Athens, the son and heir to Erichthonius of Athens and his wife, the naiad Praxithea. Through his father, he was the grandson of the god Hephaestus.

== Family ==
Pandion married a naiad, Zeuxippe, and they had two sons Erechtheus and Butes, and two daughters Procne and Philomela. In some accounts, he was also called the father of Teuthras, father of Thespius, and of Cephalus. In Hesiod and Sappho Pandion is also said to be the father of the Swallow or Chelidon, the doublet of Philomela, though Procne's doublet Aëdon is never his daughter. Some scholars think Chelidon's father is a different Pandion, a doublet of Pandareus (Aëdon's father).

== Mythology ==
Pandion I was the fifth king of Athens in the traditional line of succession as given by the third century BC Parian Chronicle, the chronographer Castor of Rhodes (probably from the late third-century Eratosthenes) and the Bibliotheca. He was preceded by Cecrops I, Cranaus, Amphictyon, and Erichthonius, and succeeded by Erechtheus, Cecrops II, and Pandion II. Castor makes Pandion I the son of Erichthonius (the earliest source for this) and says he ruled for 40 years (1437/6–1397/6 BC). It may be that either Pandion I or Pandion II was invented to fill a gap in the mythical history of Athens.

According to the Bibliotheca, Pandion fought a war with Labdacus, the king of Thebes, over boundaries, and married his daughter Procne to Tereus in exchange for help in the fighting, and it was during his reign that the gods Demeter and Dionysus came to Attica. After his death, the kingdom of Athens went to his son Erechtheus, while Butes received the priesthoods of Athena and "Poseidon Erechtheus" (in Athens, Erechtheus was a cult-title of Poseidon). He is said to have died of grief when he discovered that his daughters, Procne and Philomela, had died.

Either Pandion I or Pandion II was usually identified with Pandion, the eponymous hero of the Attic tribe Pandionis.

Regnal titles
Preceded by Erichthonius	King of Athens	Succeeded by Erechtheus

== See also ==
- Sanctuary of Pandion
