= Procne =

Legendary princess of Athens, sister of Philomele

- Queen of Thrace
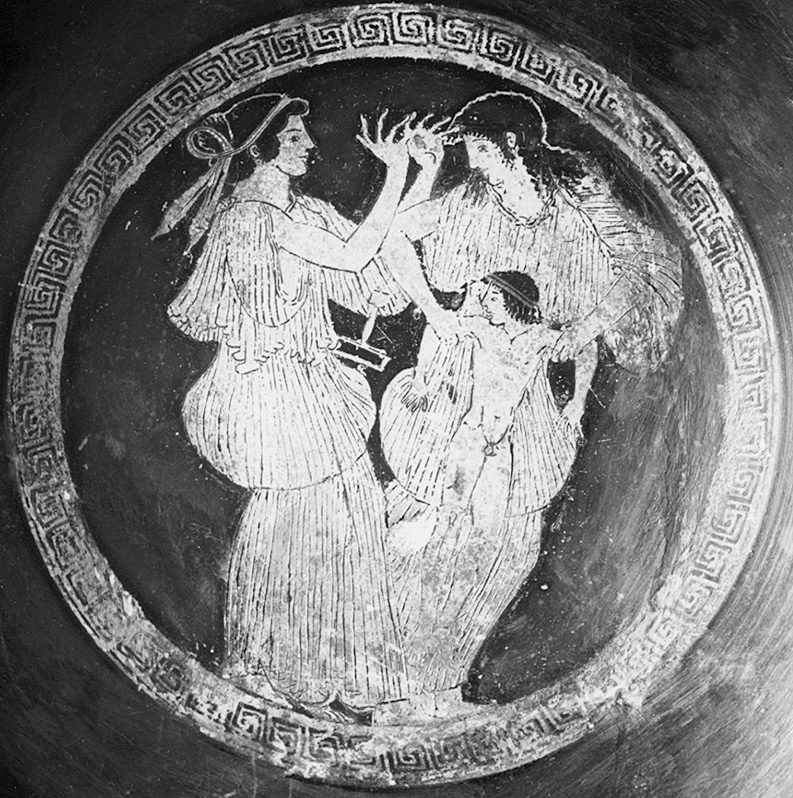
- Athenian wine cup, c. 480 BC, depicting Philomela and Procne preparing to kill Itys, exhibited in the Louvre, Paris
- Region: Athens, Thrace

Genealogy
- Parents: Pandion I (father); Zeuxippe (mother)
- Siblings: Butes, Erechtheus, Philomela
- Consort: Tereus
- Offspring: Itys

Procne (/ˈprɒkni/; Ancient Greek: Πρόκνη, romanized: Próknē [pró.knɛː]) or Progne is a minor figure in Greek and Roman mythology. Traditionally she is an Athenian princess as the elder daughter of a king of Athens named Pandion. Procne was married to the king of Thrace, Tereus, who lusted after her sister Philomela. Tereus raped Philomela, cut out her tongue, and locked her away. When Procne discovered her sister's rape from a tapestry which Philomela wove and sent to her, she took revenge against her husband by murdering their only child, a boy named Itys, and serving him as food to Tereus. Procne's story serves as an origin myth for the nightingale, a singing bird whose melodic song was believed to be a sad lament.

Procne's mythological doublet is Aëdon, the queen of Thebes who also turned into a nightingale after killing her only son. Procne's origins seem to lie in earlier traditions about the nightingale and its sorrowful song before the definitive version of her tale was probably codified during the fifth century BC in the now lost play Tereus by the Athenian tragedian Sophocles, whose initial popularity eclipsed the prior story with Aëdon. However, Procne's myth became widely known in the post-classical era due to its inclusion in Ovid's Metamorphoses, a narrative poem that went on to influence a great number of artists and authors in the western canon.

== Etymology ==
The proper name Πρόκνη is derived from the ancient Greek noun περκνός (perknós), meaning "dark-spotted" and also used for a species of eagle. It descends from the Proto-Indo-European roots *per- and *perḱ- which denote variegation.

== Family ==
Princess Procne was born to Pandion I, king of Athens and the naiad nymph Zeuxippe. Her siblings included Philomela, Erechtheus, Butes, and possibly Teuthras too. She married King Tereus of Thrace and became the mother of Itys (or Itylus).

== Mythology ==
=== Tereus and Philomela ===
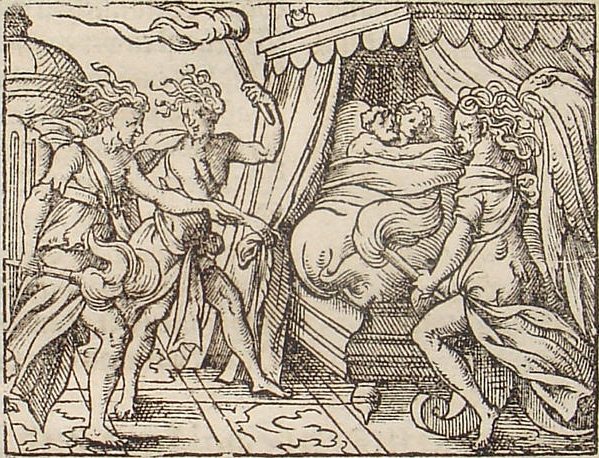
Furies at Procne and Tereus's wedding night, engraving by Virgil Solis, 1581.

The princess Procne was given to wife to Tereus, a king of Thrace, in some versions because he assisted king Pandion in a war against the Laconians, so Pandion gave him a daughter in marriage. Yet neither Hera nor Hymen, the gods of marriage, or even the Graces attended the wedding feast or the bridechamber of the two newlyweds. The only goddesses who were present were the torch-bearing Furies, a bad omen for their union. Procne left her fatherland for her new husband's kingdom, and during their marriage she bore Tereus a son named Itys. As the years passed, the lonely Procne began to feel homesick, and asked her husband to fetch her her younger sister Philomela. Tereus agreed, and so he travelled to Athens in order to escort the young Philomela to her sister.

The moment he saw the young and beautiful Philomela in the court, Tereus conceived a great passion for her, and ardently made his request, presenting it solely as Procne's wish. Pandion was unsuspecting and Philomela excited about the prospect of seeing her elder sister again, so they agreed. Tereus' passion only grew and grew during the journey back home. In one version, Tereus lied about Procne having died, and asked Pandion for Philomela's hand in marriage. When they reached the Thracian shore, he dragged her into the woods (and, as Ovid introduced, a cabin) and violently raped her in spite of her protests and pleading. Philomela then, ashamed of becoming her own sister's rival, threatened Tereus to tell everyone, so he cut her tongue off, and put guards to prevent her from escaping. He then returned to Procne claiming that Philomela had died during the journey; Procne greatly mourned her sister.

=== Procne finds out ===
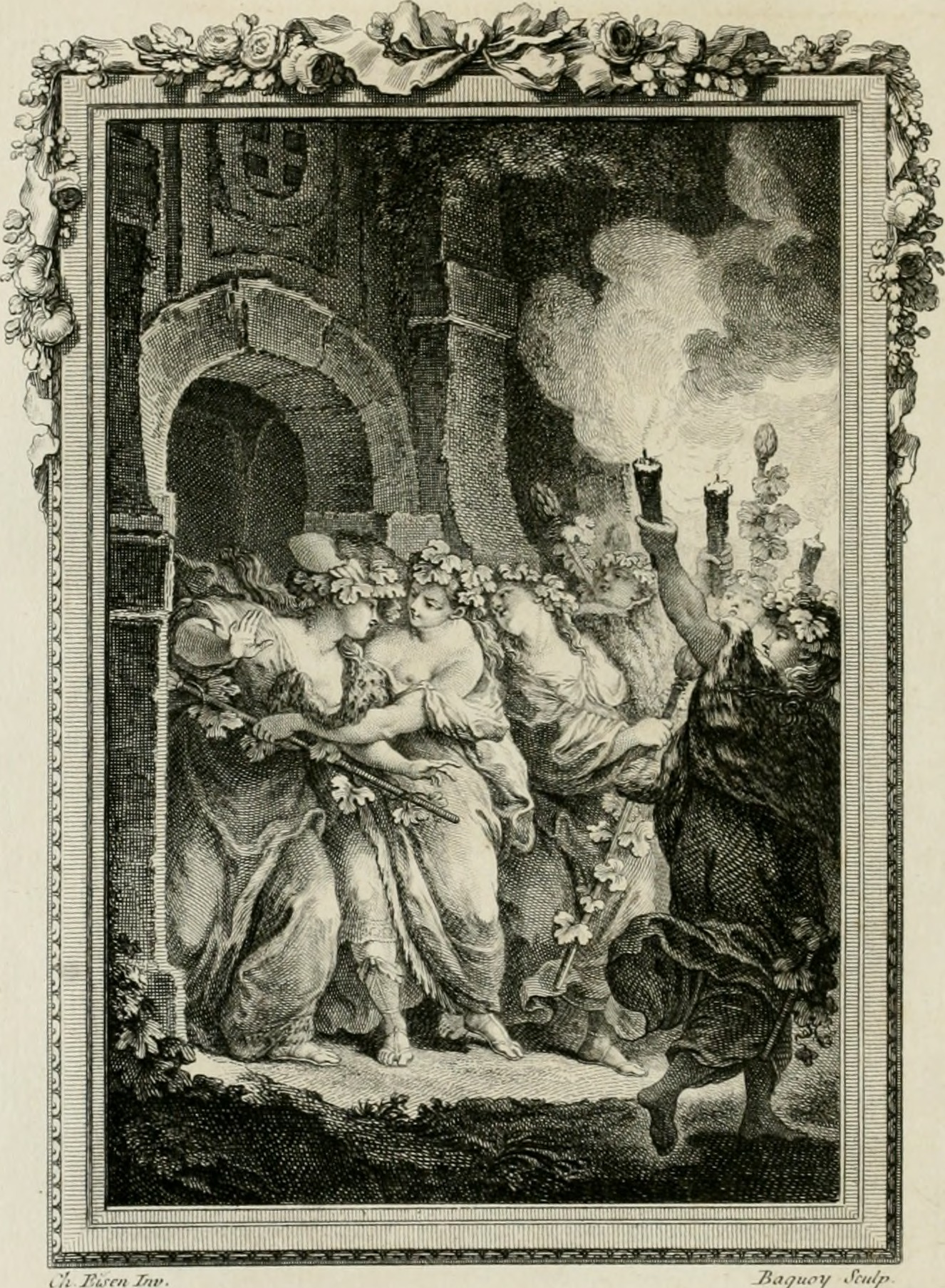
Procne rescues Philomela, 1767 engraving, Getty Research Institute.

Some time passed, in some authors as much as an entire year, (Note: Although Ovid's version was greatly influenced by Sophocles' earlier play, it is unlikely that Sophocles included Philomela's internment, so Philomela's arrival at the palace would have been immediate, concurrent to Tereus'.) and soon a Thracian festival in honour of Dionysus was held in the kingdom, during which it was customary for the Thracian women to gather gifts and send them to their queen. Philomela, unable to speak or escape her prison, wove a beautiful tapestry or gown in which she included her cruel fate at the hands of Tereus, and sent it to Procne. Once Procne got hands on her tapestry, she disguised herself in bacchic attire, joined the festivities with the other women, and located the cabin in which Philomela was kept captive. She broke in quickly, snatched her sister, dressed her in the Bacchant attire instead, and sneaked her back into Tereus's palace without anyone seeing them.

Although Philomela was unable to fully inform Procne of her woes due to no longer possessing a tongue, Procne nevertheless promised her sister to avenge the great injustice done to her. Just as she was pondering on a fitting way to enact revenge against her husband, her young son Itys entered the chamber in search of his mother. Procne, wanting revenge against Tereus and seeing their son as nothing but an extension of his father, slew him as he screamed in pain, with Philomela assisting her. Then the two women cut down Itys' dead body, boiled and cooked him in the palace's kitchens. Afterwards, Procne invited Tereus for a private dinner alone with her, with the excuse that according to an Athenian custom, the wife had to prepare dinner for her husband away from everyone else, so that no servants and guards loyal to Tereus would be present. The unsuspecting Tereus ate his own son without realising, and when he asked where the child was, Procne replied that Tereus had him in him. Philomela emerged then, and gleefully presented him with the bloody head of Itys.

Tereus eats by himself, seated in his tall ancestral chair, and fills his belly with his own child. And in the darkness of his understanding cries 'Fetch Itys here'. Procne cannot hide her cruel exultation, and now, eager to be, herself, the messenger of destruction, she cries 'You have him there, inside, the one you ask for.' He looks around and questions where the boy is. And then while he is calling out and seeking him, Philomela, springs forward, her hair wet with the dew of that frenzied murder, and hurls the bloodstained head of Itys in his father's face. Nor was there a time when she wished more strongly to have the power of speech, and to declare her exultation in fitting words.

=== Tereus's revenge ===
Tereus was horrified to discover what he had actually eaten. He tried to open up his own chest, and bitterly described himself as his son's tomb. When the initial shock and grief wore off, the enraged Tereus grabbed his sword and began to hunt down his wife and her sister with the intention to kill them. The two women ran to escape him, but he eventually caught up to them. Several authors name Daulia, a town in Phocis, as the place where he reached them, for which they were later called 'ladies of Daulia'. The gods, taking notice at last, transformed all three into birds; the bellicose Tereus became a hoopoe, a bird with a distinctive feathery crown like a warrior's helmet and an elongated beak like a sword, and the women into a nightingale and a swallow.

While Greek sources traditionally held that Procne became the melodious nightingale and Philomela the chittering swallow, Roman authors tended to swap the birds, so that Procne became the swallow, and Philomela the nightingale. This pattern is only broken by a Hellenistic Greek writer named Agatharchides, who refers to Philomela as a nightingale. Ovid, whose version went on to influence numerous artists during the medieval and early modern times, is actually neutral on the matter and does not name what bird each sister turned into. A late antiquity scholiast, Pseudo-Nonnus, names Zeus specifically as the god who put an end to the chase by transforming them all into birds. As a bird, Procne continued to mourn the death of her child for all time.

== Rarer versions ==
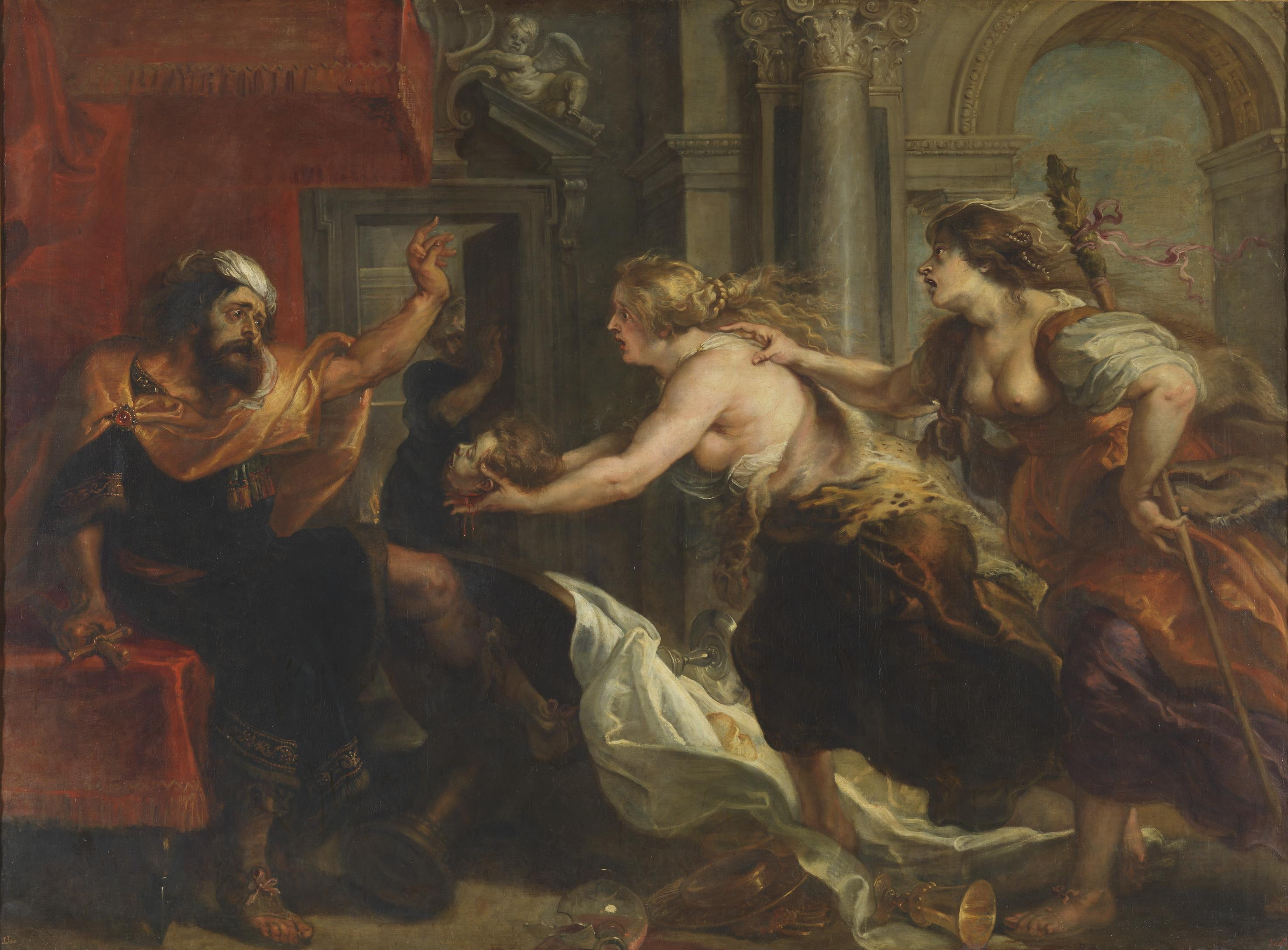
Tereus Confronted with the Head of his Son Itylus, oil on canvas 1636–1638, by Peter Paul Rubens (Prado, Madrid).

Gaius Julius Hyginus recorded a version in which Tereus asked Pandion to give him Philomela as a wife after falsely reporting to them that Procne had died. After raping Philomela, he gave her over to another king, Lynceus, as a slave. Lynceus' wife Lathusa however was a friend of Procne's, so she sent Philomela to her. Apollodorus' writing seems to hint to the same tradition, though his prose is incoherent.

The Byzantine scholar Eustathius of Thessalonica swapped the roles of the two sisters, so that Procne is the unmarried woman who was raped and mutilated by Tereus. One author has Tereus succeed in murdering both Procne and Philomela before they are all transformed into birds, but hoopoes continued to chase swallows and nightingales. In some rare and late versions, Itys too is spared and transformed into a bird, a pheasant, to be admired for its rich plummage. This element however is not present in Ovid and the majority of the other authors, in whose works Itys is unceremoniously eaten and remains dead.

Pausanias insisted that the entire story took place in Daulis, and not just the transformation of the protagonists. Thucydides reconciled this by reporting that Daulis, despite being situated in southern Greece, was populated by Thracians. Pausanias also reported that Tereus committed suicide in Megara, and afterwards the Megarians made offerings at his tomb, while the women made it to Athens and were transformed there as they cried. The Phocians claimed that swallows did not lay eggs or hatch in Phocis because Philomela was still terrified of Tereus.

=== Aëdon ===
A more or less identical tale is said of the Ephesian Aëdon ("nightingale", supplanting Procne), Chelidon ("swallow", supplanting Philomela) and Polytechnus (supplanting Tereus); in this version, which takes place in western Asia Minor rather than Thrace, Aëdon and Polytechnus challenge the gods by claiming they are happier than Zeus and Hera themselves. Hera sends Eris to sow strife between them, and the couple make a bet on who shall finish their work (a standing board for Polytechnus, embroidery for Aëdon) first. Aëdon wins with Hera's help so Polytechnus is obliged to find her a female slave. Thus he goes to her father, takes her sister Chelidon and rapes (but does not maim her, unlike Tereus) and then presents her as the prize, who is now then forced to serve her sister as Aëdon grinds her to work.

Once Aëdon accidentally overhears Chelidon lamenting her fate, the sister reveals to Aëdon what has happened, and the myth proceeds as above, with the difference that the two women manage to reach their father (who is called Pandareus here) who has his servants beat and tie up Polytechnus, and then smeared with honey and left to the mercy of insects. Aëdon, in pity, and still fond of their good memories together, scares the flies away from her husband, enraging her family. As her father, mother and brother try to attack her, the gods intervene at last and change them all into birds; Aëdon and Chelidon as per usual on account of their names' meaning, but Polytechnus becomes a woodpecker (or a pelican), Pandareus a sea-eagle, the mother a kingfisher, and it is the unnamed brother who becomes a hoopoe.

== Development ==
=== Origins of the tale ===
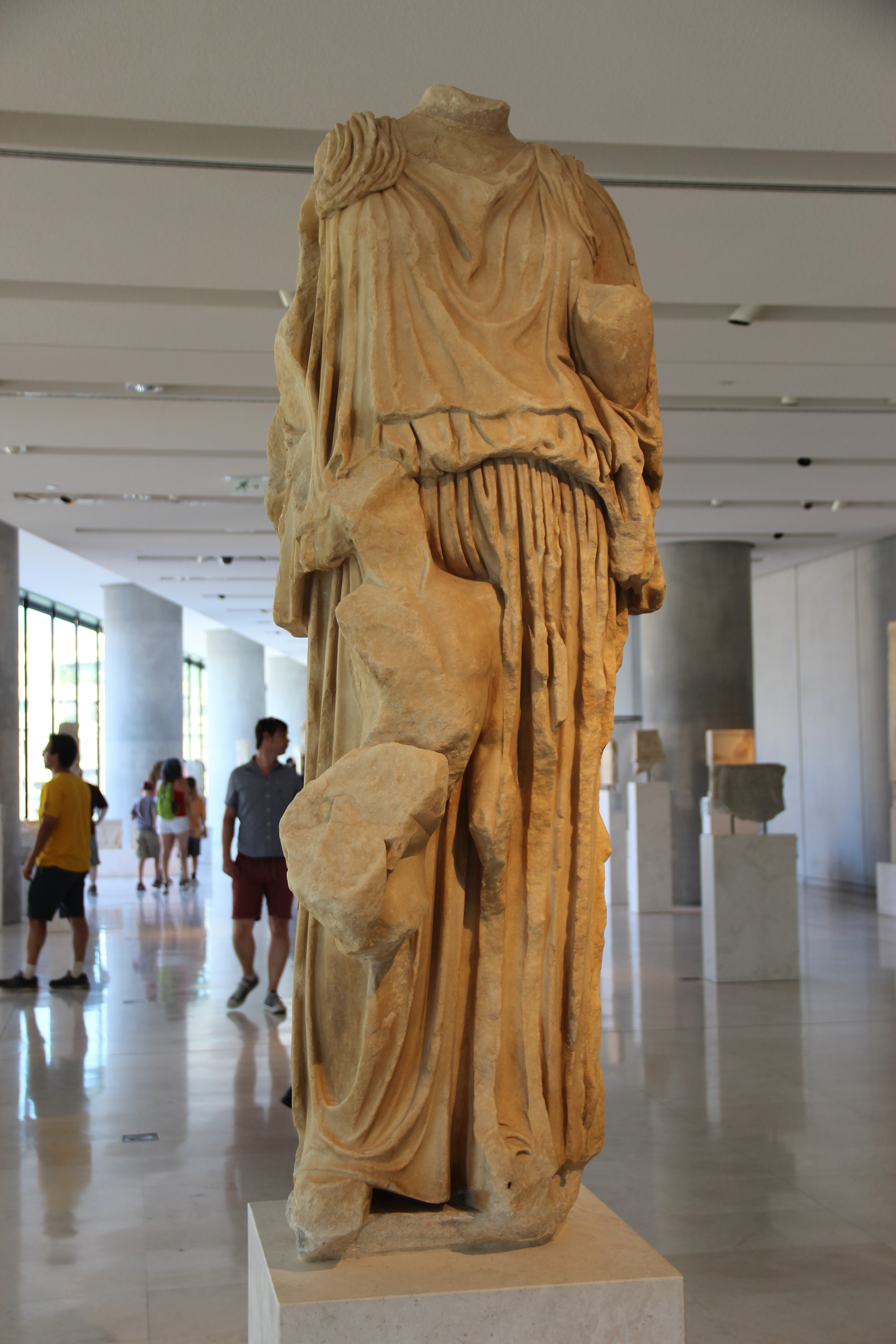
Procne and Itys statue, c. 430 BC, Acropolis Museum in Athens.

The first traces of the myth come early, as both Hesiod and Sappho refer to the swallow as Pandionis, or "daughter of Pandion". (Note: Both March and Coo think that this Pandion is not identical with the king of Athens and Philomela's father, and March suggests he is supposed to be a doublet of Pandareus.) Homer also mentions Aëdon the daughter of Pandareus who killed her son Itylus, however he makes no mention of a swallow, and the context of this version differs greatly compared to later versions since the name of her husband is given as Zethus, the king of Thebes. As later authors on Homer would clarify and expand, Aëdon the wife of King Zethus killed her son Itys or Itylus accidentally while trying to kill another boy, Amaleus, the son of her sister-in-law Niobe (the wife of Zethus's twin brother Amphion), envious of Niobe's vast progeny when she had borne only one child. She was then transformed by Zeus into a nightingale, ever wailing for the loss of her son.

This version with Niobe and Amaleus is also attributed to Pherecydes, a fifth-century BC mythographer from Athens. It is unclear how the Homeric version was eventually shaped into the familiar one with Procne, but it must have been early on as evidenced on seventh and sixth century BC artwork. A seventh century BC metope from a temple of Apollo seem to attest to the notion of the nightingale and the swallow being partners of Itys/Itylus's (Note: Itylus is the spelling in Homer and Pherecydes, but by the time of Sophocles, 'Itys' had been well established.) murder, with Aëdon/Procne as the main culprit. Hesiod might have linked those birds in some manner as well, judging by Aelian attributing a passage about the behaviour of the nightingale and the swallow to him. The second part of Aelian's paragraph, mentioning the birds' horrid acts during a dinner in Thrace, has been interpreted as an attribution to some Hesiodic work but it should not be counted as such, as it falls outside of Aelian's initial attribution and constitutes Aelian's own commentary; it should be understood that there is no hard confirmation of a connection between the nightingale and the swallow in pre-Sophoclean literature. Some vases of that era, although much less certainly, might depict the scene of the murder. We eventually end up with two main storylines; one in which the daughter of Pandareus acts alone and her murder of her son is accidental, and one where two sisters, one married and one unmarried, plot to slaughter together the married sister's child.

It has been suggested that those myths descend from an earlier story about a woman trying to harm her female rival's child, and that the figure of the sister who is sexually linked to the husband is an offshoot of Aëdon's original woman rival. Fontenrose compared Procne's tale with one version of the myth of Athamas, whose wife Ino killed their sons after he slept with their slave Antiphera, as well as one variation of the Aëdon myth in which she kills her son because of her husband's infidelity. Moreover, it is also possible that the Anatolian Pandareus (Aëdon's father) was confused with the Athenian Pandion (king of Athens) due to their names' similarity, and thus the nightingale and the swallow joined the Athenian mythological traditions, as both Procne and Philomela are in a sense intrusive to the legendary Athenian royal line (and so are Zethus and Niobe for Thebes).

==== The tragic poets ====
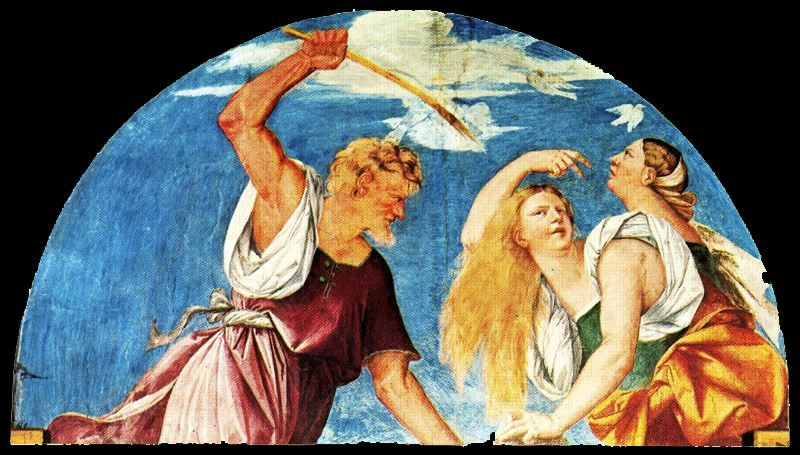
Procne, Tereus and Philomela, 16th century, by Sebastiano Del Piombo.

Tereus himself is first attested in the tragedian Aeschylus, described as the husband of the hawk-chased Nightingale who killed her own son and now laments him. Aeschylus' nephew Philocles presented a Pandionis tetralogy of his own in the late fifth century BC which must have included Procne, but nothing remains of it.

One of the earliest full accounts was given by Sophocles, in his now lost play Tereus, of which only brief fragments and a synopsis remain as means for reconstruction. Ovid's version, while useful for the reconstruction of the play, cannot be identical to it since his poetry clashes with typical tragedy structure and the limitations of theatrical plays. It is not known how Philomela was introduced to the household; perhaps she was as herself (but unable to speak and inform Procne) or disguised as a slave against her will. According to Fitzpatrick, the play apparently began with Tereus arriving in Thrace and lying to Procne about Philomela being dead, while bringing with him a female slave, who is in truth Philomela in forced disguise. The opening possibly paralleled the openings of Agamemnon and Women of Trachis, in both of which a household awaits the master's return, who comes back accompanied by a sex slave that does not speak (Cassandra refuses to speak initially, Iole is a mute role, Philomela is mutilated), causing jealousy and anger to the wife.

Procne at some point had a soliloquy where she lamented her isolation and the social position of married women, and in particular her position as a Greek woman married to a barbarian (a foreigner), before discovering the truth thanks to the tapestry. A rather bizarre plotpoint is Procne's utter failure to recognise her own sister, even though in this version they shared a household, which, although common in tragedy, usually concerns siblings who have not seen each other in many years, since pre-puberty. This peculiar element is also in Antoninus Liberalis' Aëdon version, perhaps inherited from Sophocles. Given how superfluous Tereus' actions in Ovid are, both cutting Philomela's tongue and imprisoning her even though either would be enough, he must have added the imprisonment to bypass the unconvincing non-recognition, as the glossectomy was too engraved in popular consciousness by that point. The recognition of Philomela would have taken place on stage, followed by Procne's gruesome revenge and Tereus's realization of his own cannibalism. A messenger then would announce the transformation of the three into birds by a deus-ex-machina, who in this play most likely was Apollo. A divine character then concludes the play with the final lines:

He was foolish but the women went more foolishly too far in avenging him. For a person who, excited in misfortune, fixes on the remedy greater than the disease is a physician who does not understand misfortune.

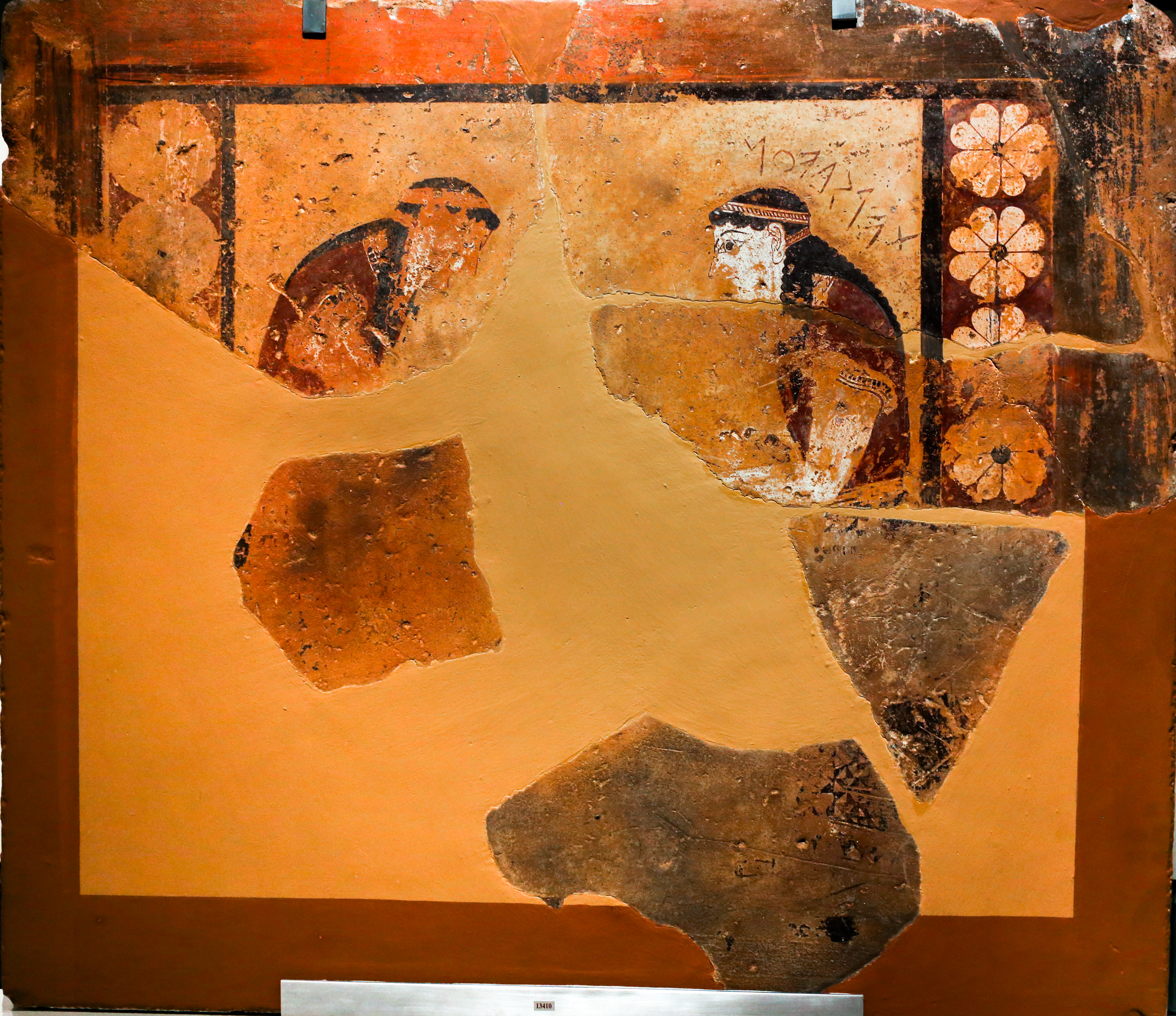
The terracotta metope from Apollo's temple at Thermos, 630–625 BC, National Archaeological Museum of Athens.

Jennifer Marsh has argued that Sophocles was inspired by Euripides's play Medea, a work where a woman murders her children in order to enact revenge against her husband, and subsequently it was him who introduced the element of deliberate filicide and child-eating in Procne's story. The chorus from Medea claims to know only one other woman who killed her child besides Medea herself, Ino, apparently knowing nothing of Procne, even though both the chorus and Euripides should have known about her. March supports her hypothesis based on the fact that Aëdon's murder in the earlier myth is accidental, and the various artistic evidence can be interpreted a number of ways; she claims that in the Thermos metope it is as much plausible that the women are mourning the dead boy, and that the Greek vases with the two women attempting to kill Itys could be depicting a different myth altogether, or an alternative version in which the aunt alone tries to harm the boy while its mother attempts to whisker him away to safety. As for the pedophagy, she claims there is no certainty about its attestation before Sophocles, with the only clue being an 470s BC Attic red-figure column-krater that shows a man, a child's leg, and two women.

The reverse however, that Euripides was inspired by Sophocles's portrayal of Procne for his depiction of Medea, could also be true. Fitzpatrick is of the opinion that Tereus was the earlier tragedy, not Medea. He also believes that the child-murder and the pedophagy were part of the earlier telling Sophocles used as source and rather it is the Thracian setting that is a Sophoclean addition. What does definitely not have a clear precedent before Sophocles is the rape and the mutilation of Philomela. It is also likely that it was Sophocles who introduced the names 'Procne' and 'Philomela' to the Nightingale and Swallow known to Homer and Hesiod. The renaming caused the etymological connection between the women and their metamorphosis to be lost.

It would seem that it was Sophocles' play and its reception what made the myth of Procne eclipse the original Aëdon version in popularity, as aferwards mentions of the Homeric version drop except in scholiasts and commentators.

== Interpretation ==
=== The nature of the birds ===
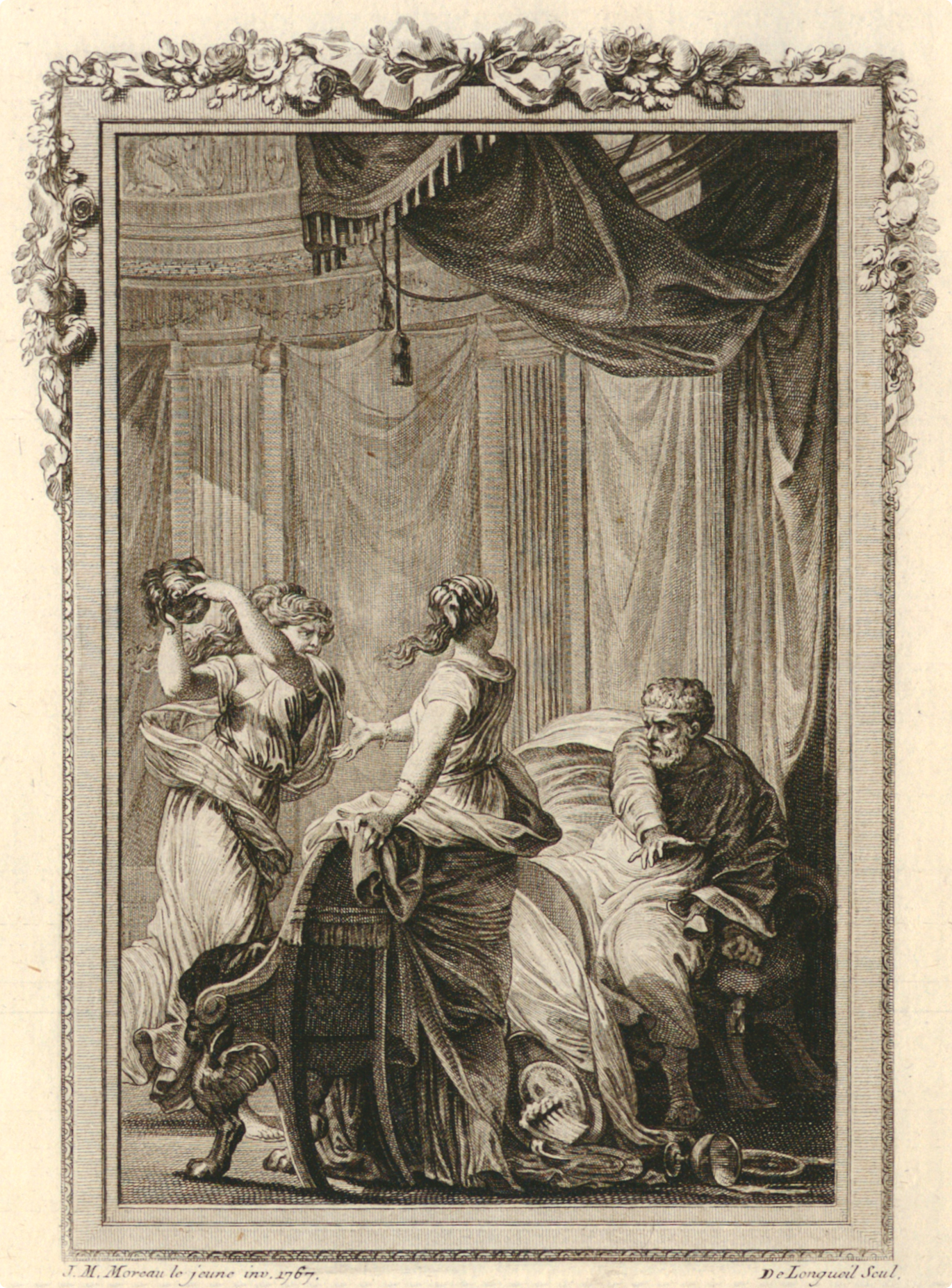
The presentation of the dead Itys, 1767 engraving by Joseph de Longueil for the Metamorphoses.

Although Procne's tale, as do many other stories featuring female nightingales, presents her as a singing bird in her new avian life, in real life it is only the male nightingales that produce the characteristic song, and females do not. Ancient Greeks and Romans connected Philomela's name to "lover of song" via folk etymology (Philomela's name would better translate to 'lover of sheep' or 'lover or apples') which is addressed in the versions where Philomela is mutilated, thus giving the origin of the tuneless twittering of the swallow. Later still authors corrected the discrepancy by swapping the birds the sisters turned into, so that Philomela became the singing nightingale. This however severed the 'logical' connection between the women and their new bodies, like the etymological one was before. But more importantly, those versions had the consequence that it was the aunt rather than the mother who was lamenting the dead boy in song form; Eustathius switching the roles of Procne and Philomela was likely an attempt to make the newer versions make sense, but he reverts back to the older stories by keeping the (tongueless) Procne as the nightingale.

Aeschylus describing the nightingale as Tereus' wife and 'hawk-chased' impplies an early version where Tereus became a hawk instead of hoopoe, also supported by Hyginus, which fits the story as hawks are large birds of prey that attack nightingales.

=== Familial bonds ===
While the numerous versions of Procne (and Aëdon's) tales vary significantly, all keep sensational elements of a mother killing her child and undergoing metamorphosis; the myth later branched out to include various issues such as a woman's debt to her birth family versus to her marital one. The tale of Procne, much more than the original myth of Aëdon, places importance on fidelity to a woman's family and pollution of the house. Like in Euripides' Medea, the leading woman is married to a foreigner and goes to live with him, now herself a stranger in strange land, and both women end up killing their offspring to spite their husbands. This element was especially pronounced in Sophocles' version, where Procne miserably declares her loneliness in her new home, laments her pitiful position as a barbarian's wife, and speaks in favour of the idea that (Greek) women are happier in their (Greek) fathers' households before they are sold away like mere commodities. The nighingale's dirge indicates that ultimately she hates killing Itys, but nonetheless she had to take extreme measures to protect her father's honour. With Procne choosing loyalty to her father over her husband, the play acts as an affirmation of Athens' patriarchical and imperialistic society, with a core theme of Athens versus barbarians. Notably, the sisters demonstrate their Athenian cultural superiority with the use of literacy and feminine arts against the illiterate Tereus, who only perceives the tongue as a potential danger, though eventually they are described as ‘even more foolish’ than him. (Note: Whether Philomela wove words or pictures in her tapestry remains a big debate. If it was words, one has to wonder why she could not have written a letter instead.) The Thracian setting can be interpreted as an Athenian criticism of Thrace as a whole.

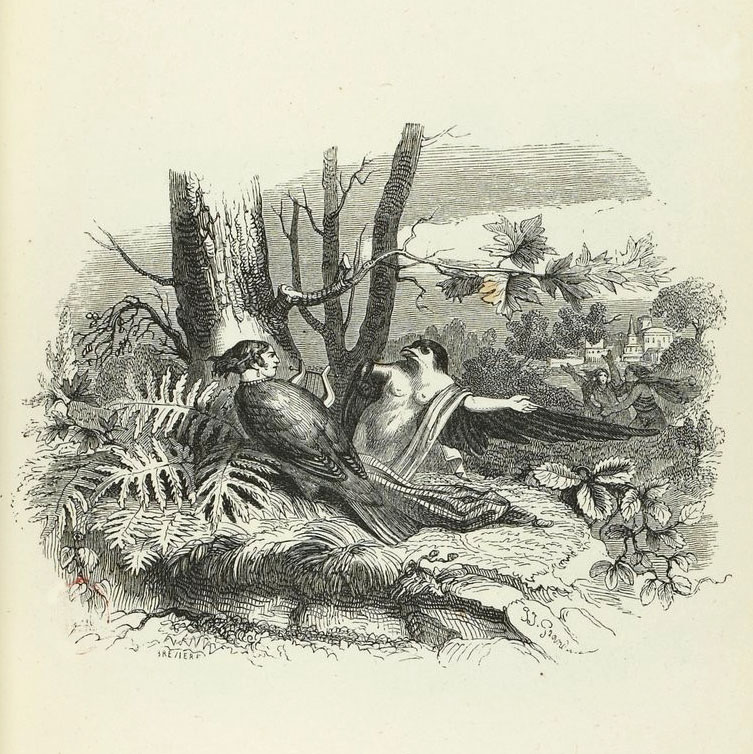
The transformed women, illustration by Jean Ignace Isidore Gérard Grandville for the Fables de La Fontaine.

A significant part of the myth's familial bond theme, particularly present in the play, is the bond of sisterhood; the play placed on the importance of sisterhood more than any other. Although women in tragedies commit various grave transgressions, there is no parallel for a woman committing atrocities for the sake of a sister, with even other examples of filicide being mostly accidental or unwitting, while Sophocles presented an umambiguous example of an all-female bond trumping the bonds between a woman and her male relations. As both women are sexually linked to the same man, a conflict arises between their roles as sisters as well as sexual rivals; in Sophocles there is a mention of Procne's jealousy after she learns the truth, echoed by Ovid having Philomela fear that Procne will hate her for becoming a rival concubine to her, but Procne eventually sides with her, choosing her sister over her child. Ovid likely took the jealousy aspect from Sophocles, but Procne's anger did not ever target Philomela. Although traditionally more emphasis has been put on preserving Pandion's honour when examining Procne's motivations, Procne acts for Philomela's sake as much as she does Pandion.

In scholarship the relationship between Philomela and Procne in Sophocles has been treated as another instance of a meek, timid sister who is unwilling to help her heroic, active one, like the cases of Antigone and Ismene or Electra and Chrysothemis. In the extant Antigone and Electra, the weak sister takes no part in action, but that does not seem to have been repeated in the case of Philomela and Procne, as Sophocles and Ovid have them both participate in the gruesome murder, equal accomplices.

=== Civilization versus wilderness ===
Another opposition presented is the one between the order of the house (and hence civilization) and the wilds; Tereus already enters the wilds, at first literally so by dragging Philomela into the woods away from everyone, and then proves himself a savage and degenerate by violating a sister-in-law in a parodic contrast of his marriage. Procne joins him (and Philomela) when she searches for her sister during a Bacchic rite, symbol of frenzy and animalistic behaviour and an opportunity for liberation from civilized life and limitations which traditionally attracted women, and further wrecks her house when she brings in Philomela, as a household cannot have two brides. In the end, both Procne and Tereus abandon their house for good and become part of the wildlife. Overall the story contrasts the fragile order of the house with the world of the animals, and the moment the house is irrepairably broken by their miasmata its inhabitants are forced to abandon it, forever cut off from the rest of society and human contact. Unlike Sophocles, Ovid presented the metamorphosis not as a direct act of the gods but a consequence of the trio's inhumanity.

== Legacy ==
The swallow genera Progne, Ptyonoprogne and Psalidoprocne and the treeswift family Hemiprocnidae derive their names from the myth of this Thracian queen.

== See also ==
- Child cannibalism
- Gudrun
- Titus Andronicus

== Bibliography ==
- Abbattista, Alessandra; Blanco, Chiara; Haley, Maria; Savani, Giacomo, eds. (August 22, 2025). Tereus Through the Ages: Reassembling the Myth of Tereus. De Gruyter. ISBN 9783110728705.
- Aelian, Various Histories, translated by Thomas Stanley (d.1700) edition of 1665, a text in the public domain, nobly digitized by the University of Chicago. Online version at Topos Text.
- Aeschylus, The Suppliants in Aeschylus, with an English translation by Herbert Weir Smyth, Ph.D. in two volumes. 2. Suppliant Women. Herbert Weir Smyth, Ph.D. Cambridge, MA. Harvard University Press, 1926.
- Antoninus Liberalis, The Metamorphoses of Antoninus Liberalis translated by Francis Celoria (Routledge 1992). Online version at the Topos Text Project.
- Apollodorus, The Library with an English Translation by Sir James George Frazer, F.B.A., F.R.S. in 2 Volumes, Cambridge, MA, Harvard University Press; London, William Heinemann Ltd. 1921. ISBN 0-674-99135-4. Online version at the Perseus Digital Library. Greek text available from the same website.
- Beekes, Robert S. P. (2010). Lucien van Beek (ed.). Etymological Dictionary of Greek. Leiden, Boston: Brill. ISBN 9789004174207.
- Celoria, Francis (1992). The Metamorphoses of Antoninus Liberalis: A Translation with Commentary. Routledge. ISBN 9780415068963.
- Conon, Fifty Narrations, surviving as one-paragraph summaries in the Bibliotheca (Library) of Photius, Patriarch of Constantinople, translated from the Greek by Brady Kiesling. Online version at the Topos Text Project.
- Coo, Lyndsay (2013). "A Tale of Two Sisters: Studies in Sophocles' Tereus". Transactions of the American Philological Association. 143 (2). JSTOR 43830266.
- Fitzpatrick, David (November 2007). "Reconstructing a Fragmentary Tragedy 2: Sophocles' Tereus" (PDF). Practitioners Voices in Classical Reception Studies (1): 39–45.
- Fitzpatrick, David (2001). "Sophocles' Tereus". The Classical Quarterly. 51 (1): 90–101. doi:10.1093/cq/51.1.90. JSTOR 3556330.
- Fontenrose, Joseph Eddy (1948). "The Sorrows of Ino and Procne". Transactions and Proceedings of the American Philological Association. 79. Johns Hopkins University Press: 125–167. doi:10.2307/283358. JSTOR 283358.
- Forbes Irving, Paul M. C. (1990). Metamorphosis in Greek Myths. Clarendon Press. ISBN 0-19-814730-9.
- Gantz, Timothy (1993). Early Greek Myth: A Guide to Literary and Artistic Sources. Vol. I. Johns Hopkins University Press. ISBN 978-0-8018-5360-9.
- Hyginus, Gaius Julius, The Myths of Hyginus, edited and translated by Mary A. Grant, Lawrence: University of Kansas Press, 1960. Online version at Topos Text.
- Jobling, James A. (2010). The Helm Dictionary of Scientific Bird Names. London: Christopher Helm. ISBN 978-1-4081-2501-4.
- Johnston, Sarah Iles (December 3, 2018). The Story of Myth. Cambridge, London: Harvard University Press. ISBN 978-0-674-98955-9.
- Kiso, Akiko (1984). The Lost Sophocles. Vantage Press. ISBN 0533059038.
- Mancuso, Sabrina (2022). "Traces of Sophocles' Tereus in Ovid's Metamorphoses 6.424-674". In Bruno, Nicoletta; Filosa, Martina; Marinelli, Giulia (eds.). Fragmented Memory: Omission, Selection, and Loss in Ancient and Medieval Literature and History. De Gruyter. ISBN 9783110740387.
- March, Jenny (2000). "Vases and Tragic Drama". In Rutter, Keith; Sparkes, Brian A. (eds.). Word and Image in Ancient Greece. Edinburgh, UK: University of Edinburgh. ISBN 9780748679850.
- Maurus Servius Honoratus, In Vergilii carmina comentarii. Servii Grammatici qui feruntur in Vergilii carmina commentarii; recensuerunt Georgius Thilo et Hermannus Hagen. Georgius Thilo. Leipzig. B. G. Teubner. 1881. Online version at the Perseus Digital Library.
- Ovid (2000). Metamorphoses. Translated by Anthony S. Kline. Borders Classics. ISBN 9781587261565.
- Pausanias (1918). Description of Greece. Loeb Classical Library 93. Vol. I: Books 1-2 (Attica and Corinth). Translated by W. H. S. Jones. Cambridge MA: Harvard University Press.
- Plutarch (1961). Moralia. Loeb Classical Library 425. Vol. IX: Table-Talk, Books 7-9. Dialogue on Love. Translated by Edwin L. Minar; F. H. Sandbach; W. C. Helmbold. Cambridge, MA: Harvard University Press.
- Roberts, Bethan (November 11, 2021). Nightingale. London, UK: Reaktion Books, Ltd. ISBN 978-1-78914-474-1.
- Stephanus of Byzantium, Stephani Byzantii Ethnicorum quae supersunt, edited by August Meineike (1790–1870), published 1849. A few entries from this important ancient handbook of place names have been translated by Brady Kiesling. Online version at the Topos Text Project.
- Smith, William (1873). A Dictionary of Greek and Roman Biography and Mythology. London: John Murray, printed by Spottiswoode and Co., New-Street Square and Parliament Street.
- Thucydides, History of the Peloponnesian War, Volume I: Books 1-2. Translated by C. F. Smith. Loeb Classical Library 108. Cambridge, MA: Harvard University Press, 1919. Available at Loeb Classical Library.
- White, John T., ed. (1884). The Fourth Book of Virgil's Georgics: With a Vocabulary. Longmans, Green, and Co.
