= Itylus =

Prince in Greek mythology

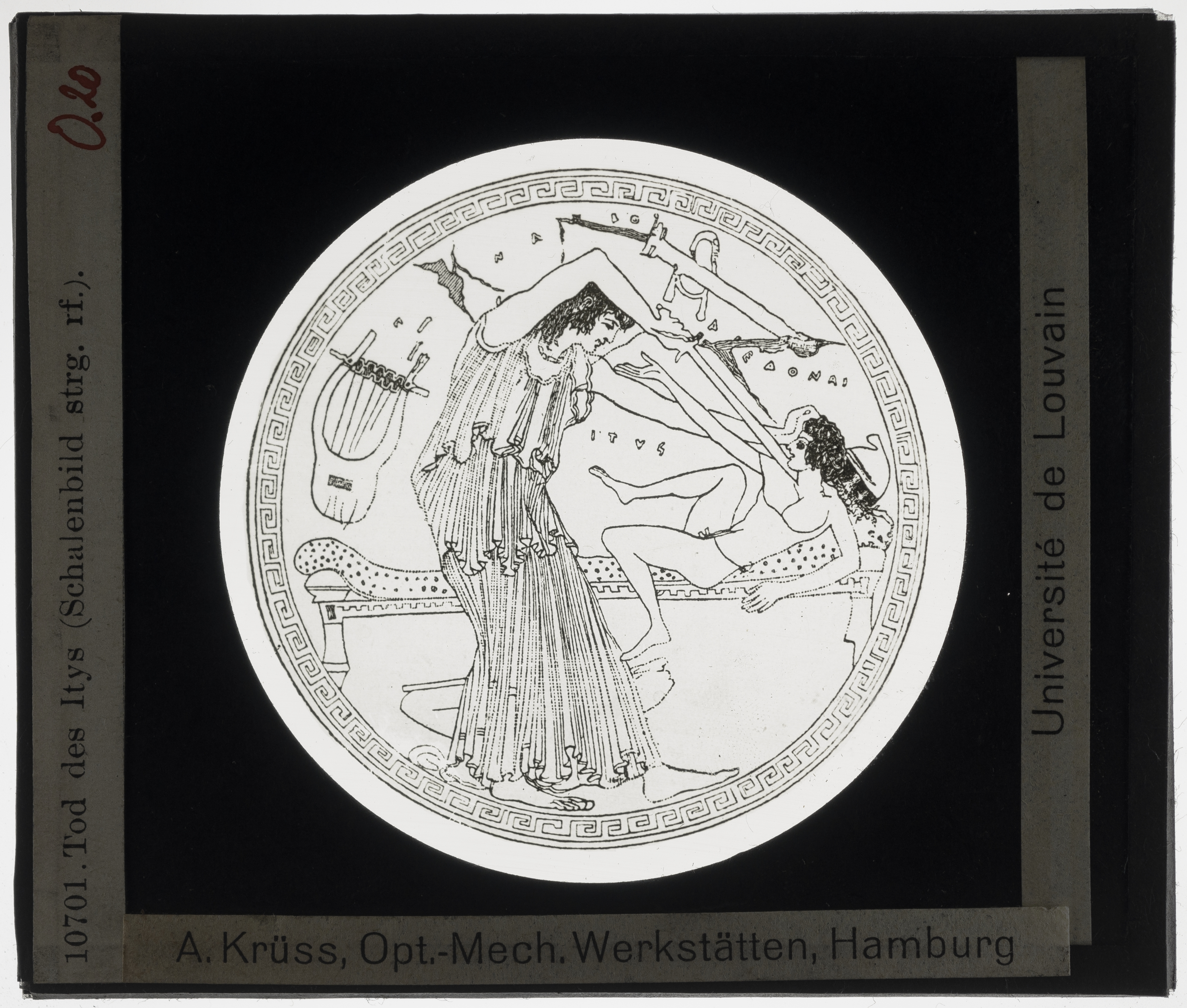
Aëdonaia slays Itys, illustration of a Greek vase by JE Harrison and DS MacColl (1894).

In Greek mythology, Itylus (Ancient Greek: Ἴτυλος, romanized: Ítulos) is the young son of Queen Aëdon and King Zethus of Thebes. Although the various versions of Itylus' tale vary greatly, they all share the theme of an only child being killed at the hands of its mother who was trying to get revenge against someone else.

In the earlier versions, Itylus was a prince of Thebes, whom his mother killed accidentally in his bed while aiming for another boy, the son of Niobe. By the fifth century BC, Itylus' name had shifted to Itys, and he was treated as the deliberate murder victim of both his mother Aëdon, later called Procne, and his aunt Chelidon, later known as Philomela, who kill him in order to avenge themselves against the boy's father's crimes.

All those tales however a similar ending, culminating in the metamorphosis of the mother into a nightingale, a songbird that continues to mourn the loss of her child.

== Mythology ==
=== Earlier versions ===
The earliest attestation of Itylus and his myth come from Homer in the seventh century BC, who has Penelope say in the Odyssey that the nightingale, the daughter of Pandareus, killed her own son Itylus when 'madness was upon her':

I lie on my bed, and the sharp anxieties swarming thick and fast on my beating heart torment my sorrowing self. As when Pandareos' daughter, the greenwood nightingale perching in the deep of the forest foliage sings out her lovely song when springtime is just begun, she varying the manifold strains of her voice, pours out the melody mourning Itylos, son of the lord Zethos, her own beloved child, whom she once killed with the bronze, when the madness was upon her; So my mind is divided, and starts one way, then another.
— The Odyssey 19.519-24; trans. Richmond Lattimore.

As one of only nine similes in the Odyssey that are longer than five lines, the thematic complexity of the image and its multiple points of contact with Penelope's situation has arrested the attention of many readers. It seems that Penelope chooses to mention Aëdon's story is due to her own desire to protect her son Telemachus, now a grown-up who does not always listen to her.

Later authors and scholiasts expand further on the story; Itylus was the only child of Aëdon ("nightingale") and Zethus (although some versions add a sister Neis).The boy got along greatly with his cousins the Niobids, sons and daughters of Niobe and Amphion, Zethus' brother, and he and the oldest Niobid, Amaleus, slept in the same room and bed. But his mother Aëdon was deeply envious of Niobe due to her vast progeny, while she only had one child. Aëdon came up with a plan to enact revenge, and instructed Itylus to sleep in the innermost position of the bed that night, but Itylus forgot his mother's words. When darkness fell, Aëdon crept up in the room Itylus and Amaleus slept with a knife and struck in blind, killing Itylus without realising. Alternatively, she could not tell who was who in the dark.

When she understood what she had done, Aëdon was horrified, but it was already too late. Zethus began to chase her down for the murder of their son, so Zethus' father Zeus spared her and changed her into a nightingale, a bird in constant mourning for her lost child. One author wrote that Aëdon did kill Amaleus, but then killed Itylus as well in fear of Niobe's reaction and retaliation. Zethus is said to have perished out of grief for the loss of his son afterwards.

In a version recorded by Patriarch Photius I of Constantinople and attributed to Helladius, Itylus is called Aëtylus, the son of Aëdon and Zetes (perhaps a mixup of the names, as Zetes is otherwise not related to the Theban mythos). Aëdon began suspecting that Zetes was having an affair with a hamadryad, and that Aëtylus was covering up for his father. In fury, she killed him after he returned from hunting, and was changed into a nightingale by Aphrodite, a bird that continued to mourn.

=== Itys ===
In later times Itylus' name is spelled Itys, and becomes associated with myths concerning child cannibalism and bird metamorphosis.

Antoninus Liberalis wrote a very different version which takes place in western Asia Minor rather than Thebes. In that one Aëdon is married to a carpenter named Polytechnus, who lost a bet against his wife and had to find her a female slave as prize. Polytechnus then took Aëdon's sister Chelidon ("swallow"), raped her, made her wear rugs and threatened her under pain of death. He then gave her to Aëdon, who initially suspected nothing.

But the truth did not stay hidden for long as Aëdon accidentally overheard her sister's laments. Once Polytechnus' deeds were revealed, Aëdon and Chelidon took revenge by slaying the young Itys and feeding him to an unknowing Polytechnus, who then hunted down the sisters in order to punish them. The story ends with the gods transforming those three (as well as Aëdon's father Pandareus, mother and brother) into birds.

== Connections ==
In later traditions starting with the fifth century BC, Itys is more commonly the son of the Athenian princess Procne, daughter of Pandion I, and the Thracian king Tereus. The more famous tale of Procne and Tereus, known via many authors, is largely the same as the one of Aëdon and Polytechnus, with notable differences that it is set in Thrace and that Tereus' motivation was desire over the sister, Philomela, and not a lost bet; additionally he also cut Philomela's tongue and kept her imprisoned, usually lying to Procne that her sister had died. Also unlike Itylus, Itys is himself transformed into a bird in some rare versions.

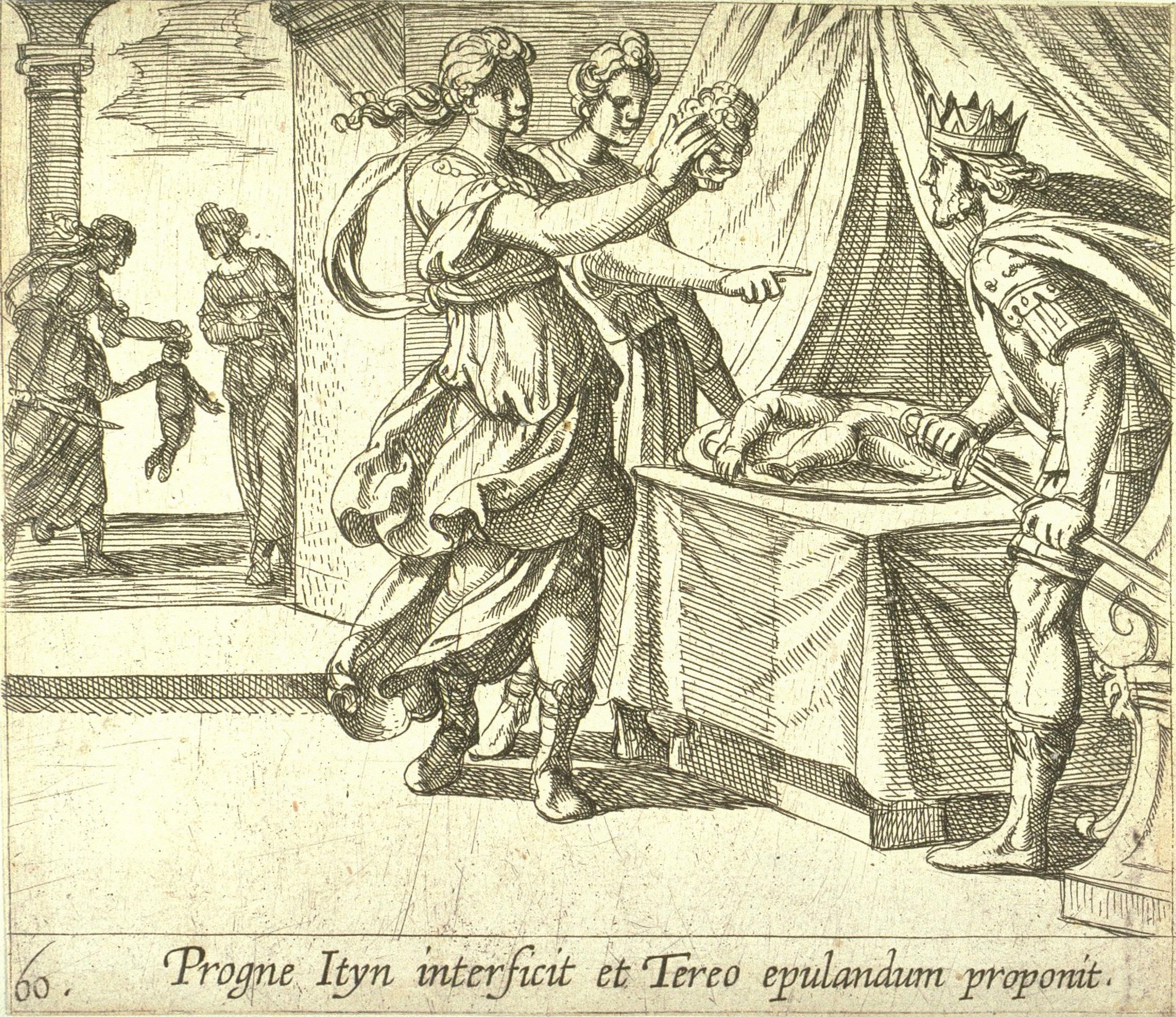
Tereus' cannibalistic banquet, 17th-century engraving by Antonio Tempesta.

A Homeric scholiast attributed the story of Aëdon killing Itylus in her effort to murder Niobe's to Pherecydes, a historian who lived during the fifth century BC. Fontenrose suggested that Homer's story was that of two rival wives, one of which plotted against the other's child, and then throughout the years the story deviated in two major paths, both of which contained the original element of the mother killing her own son; the standard Procne-Philomela tale can be interpreted as development of the hamadryad version with new names. He also compared the hamadryad story with one version of the myth of Athamas and Ino in which Ino kills their sons after Athamas sleeps with their slavewoman Antiphera. The two major versions can be summed up as one where the nightingale acts alone and her killing is accidental, and one where the nightingale and swallow conspire to kill the married sister's child.

'Itylus' is the oldest of the two forms of the boy's name, the ones used by Homer and Pherecydes, though by the time of the tragedian Sophocles the spelling 'Itys' was well-established. Sophocles also seems to be the one who introduced the Thracian setting, the mutilation of the other woman, and the names 'Procne' and 'Philomela' for the Nightingale and the Swallow into the story in his lost tragedy Tereus. Jenny March claims that the child cannibalism has no clear precedent before Sophocles either, so it is likely it was added by him as well, though Fitzpatrick disagrees, and thinks the pedophagy was part of the early source Sophocles used.

The two distinct narratives concerning Itylus seem to have co-existed simultaneously in collective consciousness until Sophocles' play popularised the Procne variation, as thereafter mentions of the Homeric one tend drop except in scholiasts and commentators. In the second century Pausanias wrote that Zethus' son was murdered 'through some mistake or other of his mother' without mentioning what it was or either's name.

== Iconography ==
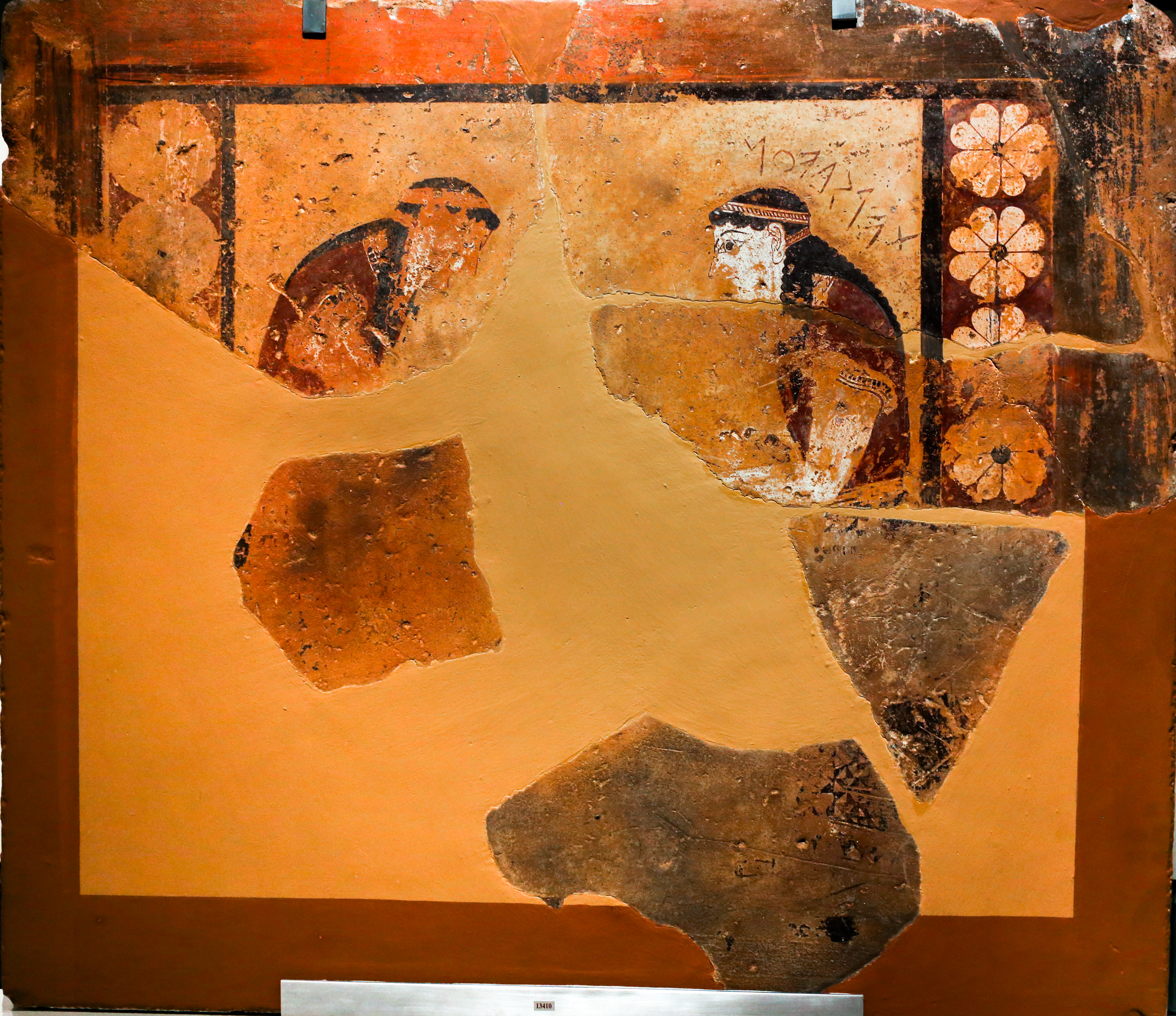
Aëdon and Chelidon from Apollo's temple at Thermos; all of Itylus but the head has been broken off, 630–625 BC.

The earliest depiction of this myth is found in a late seventh-century BC terracotta metope from the temple of Apollo at Thermos, which shows two women, one of which is labelled Chelidwon (Ancient Greek: Χελιδϝών), scheming over Itylus, whose fragments have been broken off, showing that the Swallow as the accomplice of the Nightingale had been introduced very early on. A clear depiction of the Homeric version can be seen in the red-figure Munich Cup of around 490 BC, in which Aëdonai[a] raises a sword against Itys, who is lying on a bed and begging for mercy. Other vases from the same period show the Procne version, with the addition of a second female figure assisting the first and sometimes a man that can be identified as Tereus in the morbid banquet.

A peculiar red-figure cup in the Louvre seems to show Chelidon/Philomela as the one to deal the final blow to the boy, an odd subversion given that the horror of the myth is a mother killing her own child, and no extant written source names anyone but Aëdon/Procne as the murderer of Itys. Jenny March has proposed two explanations; the first is that the cup depicts a different myth altogether (such as the Minyads murdering a child), the second that the cup depicts a version in which the wronged aunt wants to kill the boy but his mother tries to shield him from her.

A marble statuary complex was dedicated by the sculptor Alcamenes to the Acropolis of Athens during the fifth century BC, depicting Procne the moment she is about to strike her son, a small naked boy clinging to his mother. Most of his head, his legs and a big part of his torso are missing.

== See also ==
Other instances of child cannibalism in Greek mythology:

- Harpalyce
- Demophon of Elaeus
- Atreus

== Bibliography ==
- Abbattista, Alessandra; Blanco, Chiara; Haley, Maria; Savani, Giacomo, eds. (August 22, 2025). Tereus Through the Ages: Reassembling the Myth of Tereus. De Gruyter. ISBN 9783110728705.
- Alden, Maureen (September 15, 2017). Para-Narratives in the Odyssey: Stories in the Frame. Oxford, United Kingdom: Oxford University Press. ISBN 978-0-19-929106-9.
- Anhalt, Emily Katz (December 2001). "A Matter of Perspective: Penelope and the Nightingale in 'Odyssey' 19.512-534". The Classical Journal. 97 (2).
- Antoninus Liberalis, The Metamorphoses of Antoninus Liberalis translated by Francis Celoria (Routledge 1992). Online version at the Topos Text Project.
- Bell, Robert E. (1991). Women of Classical Mythology: A Biographical Dictionary. ABC-Clio. ISBN 9780874365818. Online version at Internet Archive.
- Celoria, Francis (October 24, 1992). The Metamorphoses of Antoninus Liberalis: A Translation with a Commentary'. USA, Canada: Routledge. ISBN 0-415-06896-7.
- Fitzpatrick, David (2001). "Sophocles' Tereus". The Classical Quarterly. 51 (1): 90–101. doi:10.1093/cq/51.1.90. JSTOR 3556330.
- Fontenrose, Joseph Eddy (1948). "The Sorrows of Ino and Procne". Transactions and Proceedings of the American Philological Association. 79. Johns Hopkins University Press: 125–167. doi:10.2307/283358. JSTOR 283358.
- Fowler, Robert Louis (2000). Early Greek Mythography: Texts. Oxford, New York: Oxford University Press. ISBN 0-19-814740-6.
- Gantz, Timothy (1993). Early Greek Myth: A Guide to Literary and Artistic Sources. Vol. I. Johns Hopkins University Press. ISBN 978-0-8018-5360-9.
- Hansen, William F. (2002). Ariadne's Thread: A Guide to International Tales Found in Classical Literature. UK, USA: Cornell University Press. ISBN 0-8014-3670-2.
- Homer, Odyssey with an English translation by Richard Lattimore, Harper and Row, New York, 1967. Archive.
- Johnston, Sarah Iles (December 3, 2018). The Story of Myth. Cambridge, London: Harvard University Press. ISBN 978-0-674-98955-9.
- Levaniouk, Olga (2011). "12: Aëdon". Eve of the Festival: Making Myth in Odyssey 19. Hellenic Studies Series 46. Washington, DC: Center for Hellenic Studies.
- March, Jenny (2000). "Vases and Tragic Drama". In Rutter, Keith; Sparkes, Brian A. (eds.). Word and Image in Ancient Greece. Edinburgh, UK: University of Edinburgh. ISBN 9780748679850.
- Pausanias, Description of Greece with an English Translation by W.H.S. Jones, Litt.D., and H.A. Ormerod, M.A., in 4 Volumes. Cambridge, MA, Harvard University Press; London, William Heinemann Ltd. 1918. Online version at the Perseus Digital Library.
- Pimentel, Maria Cristina; Simoes Rodrigues, Nuno (March 20, 2019). Violence in the Ancient and Medieval Worlds. Bristol, USA: Peeters, ISD LLC. ISBN 978-90-429-3602-7.
- Scherf, Johannes (October 1, 2006). "Pandareus". In Cancik, Hubert; Schneider, Helmuth (eds.). Brill's New Pauly. Translated by Christine F. Salazar. Tübingen: Brill Reference Online. doi:10.1163/1574-9347_bnp_e905510. ISSN 1574-9347.
- Schmitz, Leonhard (1867). Smith, William (ed.). A Dictionary of Greek and Roman Biography and Mythology. Boston. Archived from the original on October 14, 2013.
- Trianti, Ismene (1998). Το Μουσείο Ακροπόλεως [The Acropolis Museum] (PDF) (in Greek). Athens, Greece: OLKOS publications. ISBN 960-7169-84-0.
- Touloupa, Eve (1986). "Procne et Philomela". Lexicon Iconographicum Mythologiae Classicae (LIMC). Vol. V.1: Oidipous – Theseus. Zürich and Munich: Artemis Verlag. ISBN 3760887511. Internet Archive.
- Tripp, Edward (June 1970). Crowell's Handbook of Classical Mythology (1st ed.). Thomas Y. Crowell Co. ISBN 069022608X.
