= Harmothoë =

Greek mythological character

In Greek mythology, Harmothoë (Ancient Greek: Ἁρμοθόη, romanized: Harmothóē, lit. 'fast-fitting', 'swift-joining' or 'nimble coordinator') is a minor character, the wife of Pandareus and the mother of his children. Harmothoë usually joins Pandareus in his demise when he angers the gods.

== Family ==
Harmothoë's parentage and homeland are unknown. She married Pandareus, who hailed from Asia Minor, and had three daughters by him; Aëdon, Cleothera and Merope. Pausanias calls the later two Cameiro and Clytie, while Antoninus Liberalis writes that Pandareus and his wife (whom he does not name) had two daughters named Aëdon and Chelidon and an unnamed son.

== Mythology ==
After her husband failed to steal a golden dog from Zeus, he and Harmothoë fled to Sicily where they perished miserably. Following their deaths, Aphrodite, Hera and Athena took care of their daughters Cleothera and Merope, but when Aphrodite tried to find them husbands, strong winds carried them away and they became handmaidens to the Furies; Aëdon meanwhile was wed to Zethus and bore him a son named Itylus.

In a myth preserved by Antoninus Liberalis (who does not confirm the identity of Pandareus's wife as Harmothoë), Aëdon's husband Polytechnus rapes and forces the virgin Chelidon into slavedom. The two sisters manage to escape and find shelter with their parents, while their servants tie up Polytechnus, smear him with honey and leave him to the insects. Aëdon however pitied him so she kept the flies at bay. Pandareus, the wife and the brother perceived this as betrayal, and tried to attack Aëdon. Zeus then transformed the entire family and Polytechnus into birds, with the wife becoming a kingfisher.

== See also ==
- Lelante
- Harpe
- Side

== Bibliography ==
- Antoninus Liberalis, The Metamorphoses of Antoninus Liberalis translated by Francis Celoria (Routledge 1992). Online version at the Topos Text Project.
- Bell, Robert E. (1991). Women of Classical Mythology: A Biographical Dictionary. ABC-Clio. ISBN 9780874365818.
- Celoria, Francis (October 24, 1992). The Metamorphoses of Antoninus Liberalis: A Translation with a Commentary'. USA, Canada: Routledge. ISBN 0-415-06896-7.
- Eustathius of Thessalonica, Scholia Antiqua in Homeri Odysseam, ed. Angelo Mai, Libraria Myliana, 1821. Available at google books.
- Forbes Irving, Paul M. C. (1990). Metamorphosis in Greek Myths. Clarendon Press. ISBN 0-19-814730-9.
- Pausanias, Pausanias Description of Greece with an English Translation by W.H.S. Jones, Litt.D., and H.A. Ormerod, M.A., in 4 Volumes. Cambridge, MA, Harvard University Press; London, William Heinemann Ltd. 1918. Online version at the Perseus Digital Library.
- Smith, William (1873). A Dictionary of Greek and Roman Biography and Mythology. London, UK: John Murray, printed by Spottiswoode and Co. Online version at the Perseus.tufts library.
