= Antiphera =

Slave woman in Greek mythology

In Greek mythology, Antiphera (Ancient Greek: Ἀντιφέρα, romanized: Antiphéra) is a slave woman from Aetolia in the service of Athamas and Ino, a king and queen in Boeotia. Antiphera caught the eye of Athamas, and thus incurred the wrath of his wife Ino. The story is mostly known through Plutarch, a Greek philosopher of the Roman imperial era.

== Mythology ==
Antiphera was an Aetolian woman who served as a slave for the royal couple of Boeotia, King Athamas and Queen Ino. Ino and Athamas had children together, but he soon initiated sexual relations with the slave woman which he tried to keep secret. Nevertheless, his wife Ino found out, and in her jealousy-induced rage, she took her anger out on Melicertes, one her sons by Athamas, by killing him.

== Culture ==
This story was used in classical antiquity to explain why slave women were forbidden from entering the shrine of Mater Matuta (the Roman equivalent of the goddess Ino/Leucothea), and the women who brought a single female slave with them would beat and slap them on the head; meanwhile in Chaeronea, Plutarch's hometown, the guardian of the temple would take a whip and shout "Let no slave enter, nor any Aetolian, man or woman!" while outside Leucothea's temple.

Scholar Joseph Fontenrose compared this story to the myths of Aëdon and Procne, both royal women of the wider Attica-Boeotia region who killed their sons Itylus/Itys in order to take revenge against their unfaithful husbands Zethus/Polytechnus and Tereus respectively.

== See also ==
- Harpalyce, who killed her son to avenge herself
- Hagar
- Eurycleia

== Bibliography ==
- Bell, Robert E. (1991). Women of Classical Mythology: A Biographical Dictionary. ABC-Clio. ISBN 9780874365818.
- Fontenrose, Joseph Eddy (1948). "The Sorrows of Ino and Procne". Transactions and Proceedings of the American Philological Association. 79. Johns Hopkins University Press: 125–167. doi:10.2307/283358. JSTOR 283358.
- Ovid, Fasti, translated by James G. Frazer. Revised by G. P. Goold. Loeb Classical Library 253. Cambridge, MA: Harvard University Press, 1931.
- Plutarch, Moralia, Volume IV: Roman Questions. Greek Questions. Greek and Roman Parallel Stories. On the Fortune of the Romans. On the Fortune or the Virtue of Alexander. Were the Athenians More Famous in War or in Wisdom?. Translated by Frank Cole Babbitt. Loeb Classical Library 305. Cambridge, MA: Harvard University Press, 1936.
- Plutarch, Lives, Volume II: Themistocles and Camillus. Aristides and Cato Major. Cimon and Lucullus. Translated by Bernadotte Perrin. Loeb Classical Library 47. Cambridge, MA: Harvard University Press, 1914.
- Smith, William (1873). A Dictionary of Greek and Roman Biography and Mythology. London: John Murray: printed by Spottiswoode and Co.
