= Chelidon (sister of Aëdon) =

Greek mythological figure

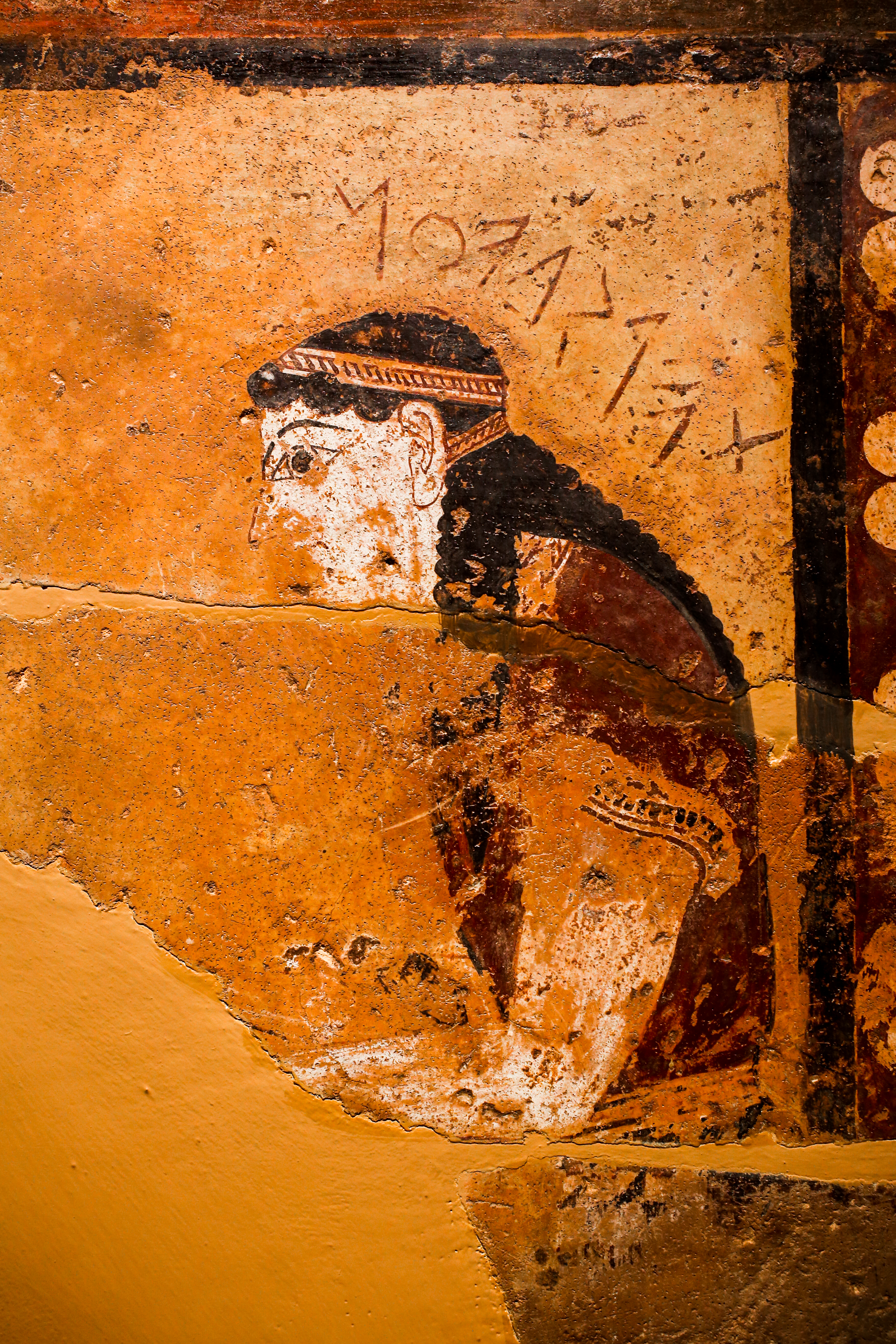
Chelidwon (Χελιδϝών) with the head of Itys on a terracotta metope from the temple of Apollo at Thermos, 7th century BC.

In Greek mythology, Chelidon (Ancient Greek: Χελιδών, romanized: Khelidṓn, lit. 'swallow') or Chelidonis is a minor figure, a noblewoman from either Miletus or Ephesus, cities on the western coast of Asia Minor. One of the daughters of Pandareus, Chelidon is presented as a virgin who is abused and violated by her brother-in-law Polytechnus and then forced to serve as a slave her older sister Aëdon before revealing her identity to her sister and transforming into a swallow in an Anatolian variant of the story of Philomela, though she might have had an independent origin in Attica, Philomela's homeland. The most significant difference between the two stories is that Chelidon, unlike Philomela, is not mutilated.

== Family ==
According to Antoninus Liberalis, Chelidon was the daughter of Pandareus by his (unnamed) wife and sister to Aëdon and an unnamed brother. Eustathius of Thessalonica wrote that the name of Pandareus's wife was Harmothoë, although he does not list Chelidon among their daughters (Aëdon, Cleothera and Merope) and mentions no brother. According to Pausanias, the two other sisters were called Cameiro and Clytia.

Sometimes the Miletus that Chelidon was from was identified not with the more known one in Anatolia, but with a city in Crete, since some of her father's myths are set in Crete instead. Celoria however thinks that the Pandareus from Crete and the Pandareus from Chelidon's tale were supposed to be different figures.

Both Hesiod and Sappho wrote that the swallow (Chelidon) is the daughter of the Athenian king Pandion I, the father of Philomela. (Note: However a number of scholars think that King Pandion is not identical to Philomela's father, and Jenny March suggests that rather he is a doublet of Pandareus.)

== Mythology ==
After her sister Aëdon won a bet against her husband Polytechnus, Polytechnus was forced to find his wife a female slave as promised. He went to his wife's father Pandareus, claiming that Aëdon wanted to see her sister. Chelidon thus left with Polytechnus to visit Aëdon, but on the way there he raped the maiden while she cried and prayed to Artemis for help. He then cut her hair short, dressed her up as a slave, and terrorized her against telling anyone what had happened. He then gave her to Aëdon as a slave. Aëdon did not suspect anything and for a time Chelidon suffered in silence due to the great load of work her unsuspecting sister gave her, until one day Aëdon overheard Chelidon lamenting her cruel fate.

Enraged at the treatment of her sister, Aëdon decided to avenge her. The two sisters then killed Itys, Aëdon's son by Polytechnus, and fed him to his unwitting father while they ran back to their own. Polytechnus was not slow in figuring out what had happened and was soon hunting them down, but Pandareus protected his daughters and had Polytechnus tied up, smeared with honey and left to the mercy of flocks of flies. But Aëdon, feeling sorry for her husband, kept the flies off of him. Angered over what they perceived as her betrayal, Pandareus, his unnamed wife and son attacked her, so Zeus decided to turn them all into birds. Chelidon, like Philomela, became a swallow, a bird with a tuneless twitter unlike the mellifluous song of the nightingale, the bird Aëdon turned into. Artemis bid that Chelidon would always dwell near humans in her new avian life.

== Origin ==
The story of Chelidon seems to be an Anatolian variety of the myth of Procne and Philomela, in which Chelidon supplants Philomela, the unmarried sister abused by her brother-in-law. Unlike Chelidon, Philomela had her tongue cut by Tereus (Polytechnus) so she had to weave a tapestry in order to inform her sister. When Tereus chased the two sisters down following the murder of Itys, all three were changed into birds.

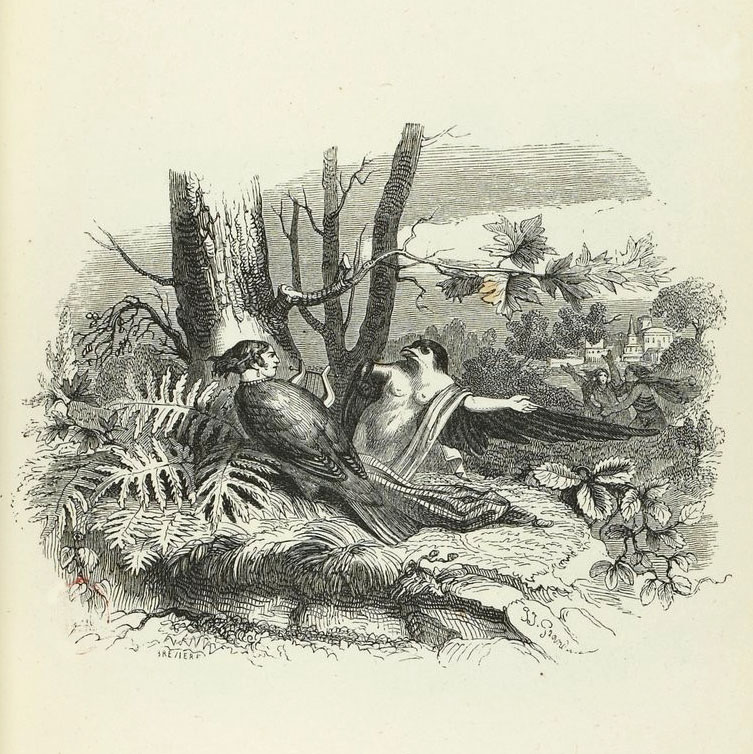
The transformed women, illustration by Jean Ignace Isidore Gérard Grandville for the Fables de La Fontaine.

However, both Chelidon and Aëdon appear to individually predate the myth of Procne and Philomela, which seems to have been shaped to its current form by the Athenian playwright Sophocles in his lost play Tereus, produced sometime in the mid to late fifth century BC. Chelidon is said by both earlier writers Hesiod and Sappho to be the daughter of Pandion (Procne and Philomela's father) instead of Pandareus, while earlier mentions of Aëdon have her kill her son Itylus or Itys unknowingly rather than wittingly in a doomed effort to hurt her rival sister-in-law Niobe by killing her son, a story which also has similarities with the standard myth of Procne and Philomela.

Those earlier stories concerning Aëdon however do not include a sister or swallows, which must have joined the myth of the nightingale later. It has been suggested the story crossed the Aegean from Asia Minor, Pandareus was mixed up with Pandion, and thus the myths of the nightingale and the swallow were combined and joined the Athenian mythos. Fontenrose suggested that the figure of the sister who is sexually linked to the husband might have evolved from the original Aëdon's rival, in a story that branched out in two major ways; one in which the nightingale acts alone and her murder of her son is accidental, and one where two sisters, one married one unmarried, slay together the married sister's son. Nevertheless, it remains unclear how the swallowless story present in the Odyssey led to the more known version with Philomela/Chelidon. It must have been fairly early due to artistic evidence of the seventh and sixth centuries BC including two women plotting over Itys instead of just one, and Hesiod and Sappho's testimonies imply they knew a swallow transformation story (which concerned the family of Pandion however, not Pandareus).

Although the motif of a bird-woman or two killing a child is older, the mutilation of the swallow was probably introduced by Sophocles and kept by following writers, along with the Thracian setting and most likely the change of the names to Procne and Philomela. The renaming of the Swallow and the Nightingale however severed the etymological connection between the two women and their bird metamorphosis. This caused further detoriation of the original symbolism, as eventually in late versions the transformations were swapped and it was the aunt who became the nightingale and the mother the swallow, which does not fit with the nightingale's melodic lament for her child and the (tongueless) swallow's inarticulate chatter. The two distinct versions remained popular for a time until perhaps Sophocles' play premiered, as afterwards mentions of the Homeric version drop except in scholiasts.

== Iconography ==
A sixth-century BC metope from Apollo's temple at Thermos depicts Chelidon and Aëdon plotting together over something that has been broken off. Some vases, although with much less certainty, also seem to depict the scene of Itys's murder by Aëdon-Procne and Philomela-Chelidon. One of them dating to the 490s BC has been interpreted to show the aunt as the woman about to kill Itys, a rather odd decision given that the myth's horror lies on a child being murdered by his own mother. Scholar Jenny March proposed two explanations for this; the first, that the cup actually depicts some other unrelated myth (such as the Minyads, who also killed a child), the second that the cup shows a version in which only the aunt attempts to murder the boy while his mother tries to shield him from her.

== See also ==
- Antiope
- Io
- Nyctaea

== Bibliography ==
- Antoninus Liberalis, The Metamorphoses of Antoninus Liberalis translated by Francis Celoria (Routledge 1992). Online version at the Topos Text Project.
- Bell, Robert E. (1991). Women of Classical Mythology: A Biographical Dictionary. ABC-CLIO. ISBN 9780874365818.
- Celoria, Francis (1992). The Metamorphoses of Antoninus Liberalis: A Translation with a Commentary. Routledge. ISBN 0-415-06896-7.
- Coo, Lyndsay (2013). "A Tale of Two Sisters: Studies in Sophocles' Tereus". Transactions of the American Philological Association. 143 (2). JSTOR 43830266.
- Fitzpatrick, David (2001). "Sophocles' Tereus". The Classical Quarterly. 51 (1): 90–101. doi:10.1093/cq/51.1.90. JSTOR 3556330.
- Fontenrose, Joseph Eddy (1948). "The Sorrows of Ino and Procne". Transactions and Proceedings of the American Philological Association. 79. Johns Hopkins University Press: 125–167. doi:10.2307/283358. JSTOR 283358.
- Forbes Irving, Paul M. C. (1990). Metamorphosis in Greek Myths. Clarendon Press. ISBN 0-19-814730-9.
- Fowler, Robert Louis (2000). Early Greek Mythography: Texts. Oxford, New York: Oxford University Press. ISBN 0-19-814740-6.
- Gazis, George A. (August 22, 2025). "Lamenting about the Wrong Crime: Homer, Sophocles and Demonising the Other". In Abbattista, Alessandra; Blanco, Chiara; Haley, Maria; Savani, Giacomo (eds.). Tereus Through the Ages: Reassembling the Myth of Tereus. De Gruyter. ISBN 9783110728705.
- Grimal, Pierre (1987). The Dictionary of Classical Mythology. Wiley-Blackwell. ISBN 0-631-13209-0.
- Hard, Robin (2004). The Routledge Handbook of Greek Mythology: Based on H.J. Rose's "Handbook of Greek Mythology". Routledge. ISBN 9780415186360.
- Homer, The Odyssey with an English Translation by A.T. Murray, PH.D. in two volumes. Cambridge, MA., Harvard University Press; London, William Heinemann, Ltd. 1919. ISBN 978-0674995611. Online version at the Perseus Digital Library. Greek text available from the same website.
- Johnston, Sarah Iles (December 3, 2018). The Story of Myth. Cambridge, London: Harvard University Press. ISBN 978-0-674-98955-9.
- March, Jenny (2000). "Vases and Tragic Drama". In Rutter, Keith; Sparkes, Brian A. (eds.). Word and Image in Ancient Greece. Edinburgh, UK: University of Edinburgh. ISBN 9780748679850.
- Pausanias, Description of Greece with an English Translation by W.H.S. Jones, Litt.D., and H.A. Ormerod, M.A., in 4 Volumes. Cambridge, MA, Harvard University Press; London, William Heinemann Ltd. 1918. ISBN 0-674-99328-4. Online version at the Perseus Digital Library
- Scherf, Johannes (October 1, 2006). "Pandareus". In Cancik, Hubert; Schneider, Helmuth (eds.). Brill's New Pauly. Translated by Christine F. Salazar. Tübingen: Brill Reference Online. ISSN 1574-9347.
- Schmitz, Leonhard (1867). Smith, William (ed.). A Dictionary of Greek and Roman Biography and Mythology. London, UK: John Murray, printed by Spottiswoode and Co. Online version at the Perseus.tufts library.
