= Pandareus =

Petty thief in Greek mythology

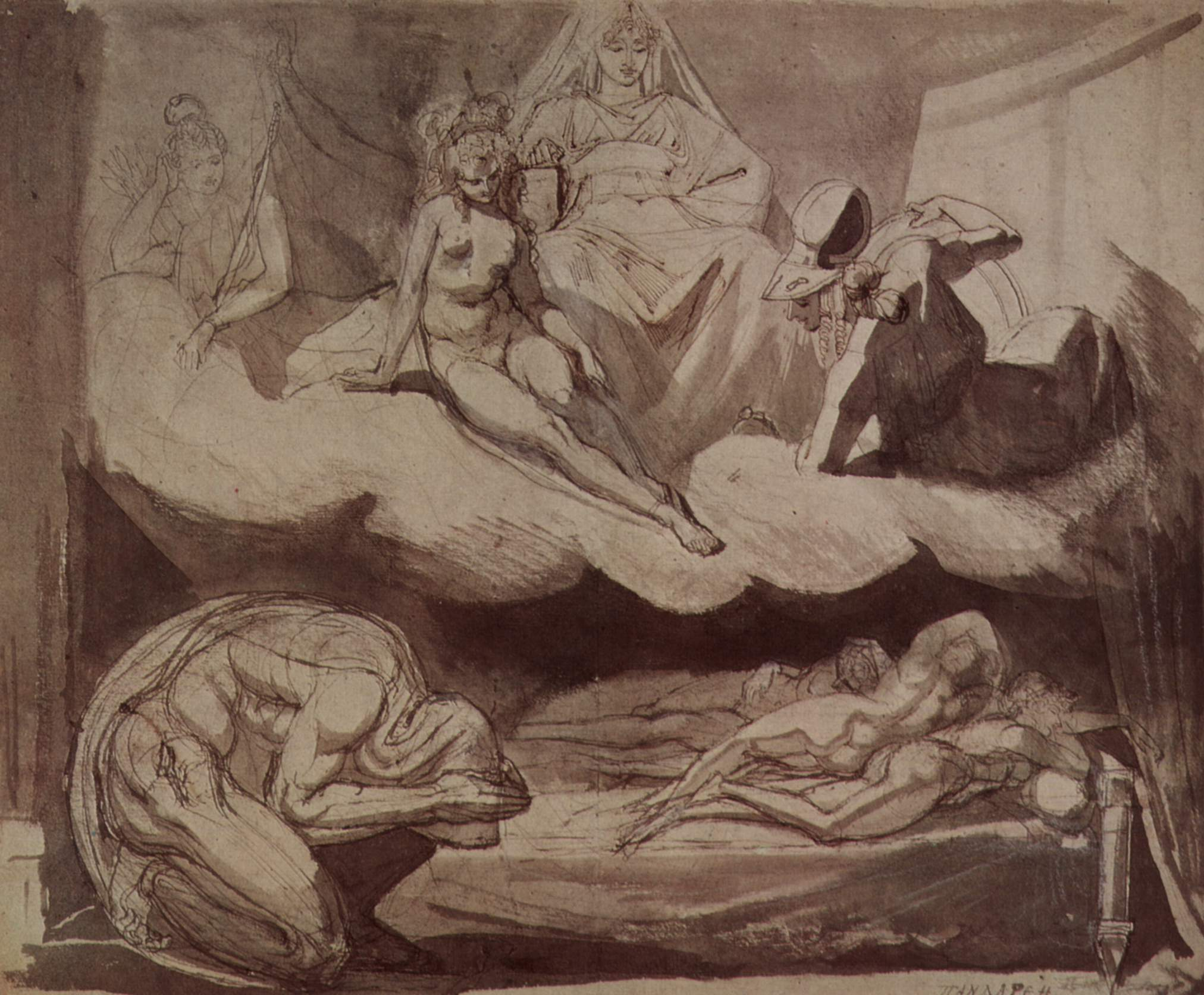
The daughters of Pandareus by Henry Fuseli, c. 1795.

In Greek mythology, Pandareus (Ancient Greek: Πανδάρεος, romanized: Pandáreos or Πανδάρεως, Pandáreōs) is the son of Merops and a nymph. His residence is usually given as either Ephesus or Miletus, though he is also associated with the island of Crete. Pandareus married Harmothoë and had several daughters by her before perishing for stealing a sacred dog that belonged to Zeus, king of the gods.

== Etymology ==
The name Pandareus was traditionally interpreted as a compound name derived from pan (meaning "all" or "every") and a root related to mastery, power, or force (ar- / krat-, or flowing/moving everywhere), translating structurally to "all-flowing," "ruling over all," or "one who has power over everything."

== Family ==
Pandareus was the son of a man named Merops and a nymph, and a descendant of the god Hermes. He was from a city called Miletus, which is sometimes identified with a city in Crete, and not the more known one on the western coast of Asia Minor. Antoninus Liberalis associated Pandareus with Ephesus, also on the Anatolian coast.

By his wife Harmothoë Pandareus was the father of three girls; Aëdon (the wife of Zethus), Cleothera, and Merope. According to Pausanias, the last two were called Cameiro and Clytia. In another version, Cleothera and Merope are omitted in favour of Chelidon and an unnamed son, born to a wife whose name is not confirmed to be Harmothoë.

== Mythology ==
Pandareus was said to have been favored by the goddess Demeter, who conferred upon him the benefit of never suffering from indigestion, however much food he should eat.

=== Pandareus' theft ===
The impious Pandareus stole a golden dog from a sacred place to Zeus on Crete; that dog had guarded Zeus and his she-goat nurse during his infancy by the will of Rhea, Zeus' mother. Pandareus carried off the dog and gave it to Tantalus for safekeeping, but when he later came back and asked for the dog, Tantalus insisted he had never received it, swearing an oath on it. Zeus punished Pandareus for the theft by turning him into stone right as he stood.

Several variations also exist. Ancient and medieval scholars, such as Byzantine scholar Eustathius of Thessalonica, write that both Pandareus and Tantalus attempted to steal the dog, which was a mechanic dog that had been crafted by Hephaestus himself, and placed in a temple of Zeus in Crete; Zeus then sent his son Hermes to deal with the two thieves. It was to Hermes that Tantalus lied about not having the dog, but Hermes found and seized the robot anyway, and brought it back to Zeus who buried Tantalus beneath Mount Sipylus. After Tantalus' demise Pandareus fled to Athens and then to the island of Sicily, where he perished together with his wife Harmothoë, leaving behind their orphaned daughters.

After the deaths of Pandareus and Harmothoë, Aphrodite took care of their daughters Cleothera and Merope. Hera taught them to be proper women, and Athena made them accomplished; but when Aphrodite went to see Zeus to get them married to proper husbands, storm winds carried them away to the Underworld to become handmaidens of the Furies, never to be seen again.

=== Polytechnus ===
In another myth, Pandareus was alive during at least one of his daughters' marriage. Aëdon married the carpenter Polytechnus, and for some time they were happy until Hera sent Eris to sow strife between them. One day Polytechnus came to him under the excuse that Aëdon wanted her sister Chelidon to come visit her, when in fact he owed his wife a female slave after she had won a bet. Pandareus, not suspecting a thing, let Polytechnus take Chelidon, but then the man proceeded to rape her and force her to serve as a slave for Aëdon. The two sisters soon escaped after killing Polytechnus' son Itys and ran back to Pandareus, who had Polytechnus tied, smeared with honey and left to the mercy of flies. Aëdon however in pity kept the flies off of Polytechnus, angering Pandareus, his wife and his son, who saw her actions as betrayal. They were about to attack Aëdon, but Zeus interfered, and transformed them all into birds. Pandareus was changed into a sea eagle, his wife into a kingfisher, his son into a hoopoe.

This narrative is not present in the Odyssey, unlike the tale of Cleothera and Merope's fates. In the Homeric version, Aëdon was married to Zethus and accidentally killed her own son Itylus; later authors explain she did so in an attempt to murder her nephew Amaleus, for she was jealous of the large number of children born to her sister-in-law Niobe (the daughter of Tantalus).

== Interpretation ==
Pandareus' descend from Hermes is probably a motif fit for a story about theft. Robin Hard speculates the part of Antoninus Liberalis' account where Tantalus lies to Pandareus about the dog to be a mistake, since it is Zeus who punishes him for the perjury.

Francis Celoria thinks that the Milesian thief of the dog (whose name is spelled with an omicron) and the Ephesian father of Chelidon (whose name is spelled with an omega) were supposed to be separate figures. Pandareus is possibly the doublet of one Pandion, who is the father of Chelidon (but not Aëdon) in some early but poorly attested traditions, otherwise identified with Pandion I, the king of Athens and father of Chelidon's doublet Philomela. According to Joseph Fontenrose, the similarity of the names ‘Pandion’ and ‘Pandareus’ possibly caused confusion between the two and this is what caused Aëdon to join the Athenian mythos, under a new name, Procne.

An ancient scholium on the Iliad claims that Niobe perished as punishment for swearing a false oath in regards to Pandareus' dog.

== See also ==
Other notable punishments in Greek mythology:

- Niobe
- Sisyphus
- Danaids
- Tityos
