= Thermos (Aetolia) =

Ancient Greek sanctuary

- Thermon, Thermum
- Location within Greece
- 38°33′34″N 21°40′5″E
- Type: Sanctuary with temple
- Periods: Late Helladic IIA to Hellenistic period
- Location: Thermo, Aetolia-Acarnania, Greece
- Region: Aetolia

History
- Built: Approximately 1500 BC onwards
- Abandoned: probably after 189 BC

Site notes
- Management: 36th Ephorate of Prehistoric and Classical Antiquities
- Website: Thermos

Thermos (/ˈθɜːrmɒs/; also known as Thermon /ˈθɜːrmən/, Thermum; Ancient Greek: Θέρμος or Thermika) was an ancient Greek sanctuary, which served as the regular meeting place of the Aetolian League. Its focal point was the temple of Apollo Thermios of about 630 to 610 BC, "one of the earliest developed Doric temples known and a monument of primary importance for our knowledge of the history of Greek architecture". The most famous survivals are the Archaic terracotta metopes decorated with painted scenes from mythology, which are among the earliest examples of this art form in Greece. What is left of these, and other finds from the site, are now in the museum at Thermos, with a selection of the best pieces in National Archaeological Museum, Athens.

Thermos was not a city in the sense of a built-up urban centre like Athens, Argos, or Corinth, and until a late date, the Aetolian League was a loose association with a tribal basis rather than a group of city-states.

The ancient name is preserved in the nearby contemporary Greek village of Thermo, Greece.

== Temple of Apollo ==
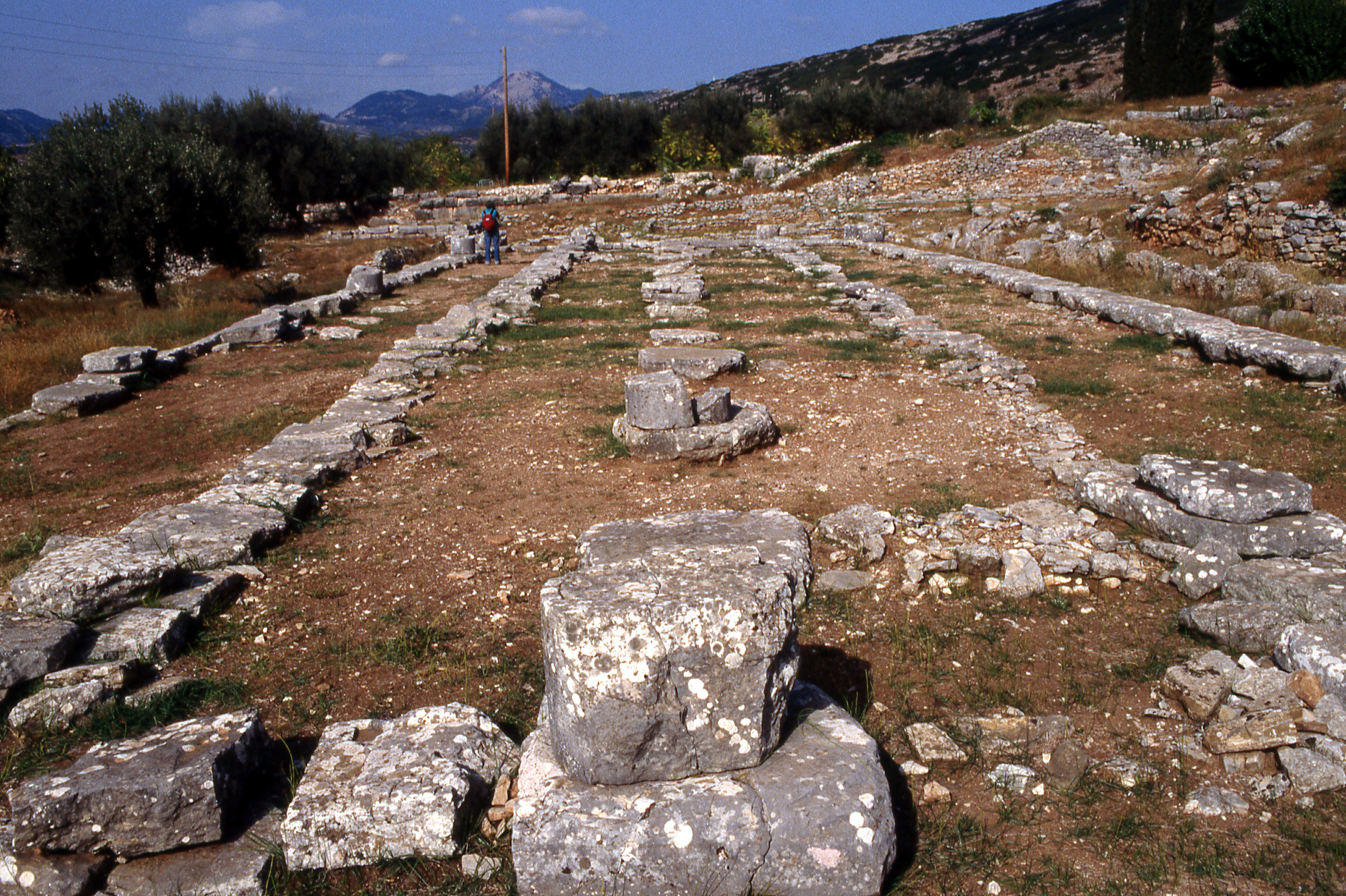
Temple of Apollo from the south

Because of the gradually diminishing significance of the site, this very early temple of Archaic Greece was never fully rebuilt and expanded, as happened to most of its contemporaries. It has one of the best preserved pterons, and "is the first of the great tiled buildings" to survive with readable remains. Originally the walls were mud brick, the columns wood, and the entablature wood decorated with painted terracotta. The roof was tiled in terracotta, a recent innovation for the Greeks; the extra weight compared to thatch or wooden shingles was perhaps a factor driving the change to building with stone.

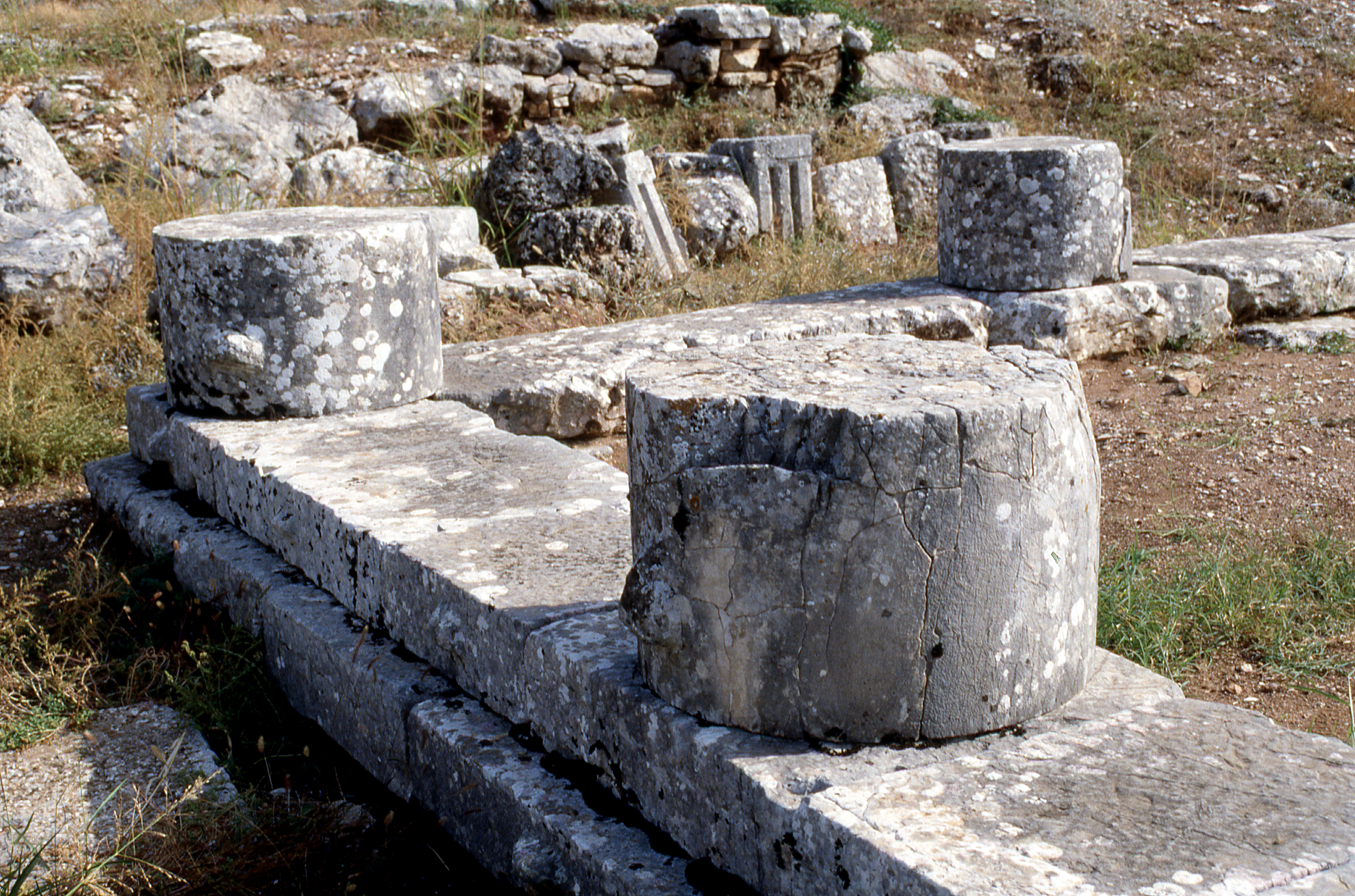
North-west corner of the temple

Much later, in the Hellenistic period, the wooden columns were replaced with stone, but the entablature seems to have been left. There were fifteen columns on each side, and five at each end (counting the corner ones twice), also a row of ten columns down the cella. The survivals in terracotta are metopes, nearly three feet square, and mask antefixes above them. The overall dimensions are c. 40 x 125 ft (12.13 x 38.23 m). It had a very early and rather deep example of an opisthodomos (rear room) with two columns down the centre. The tiled roof had a gable at the front, but sloped down at the rear.

=== Terracottas ===
There are "an elaborate series of terracotta revetments found scattered about the temple site. These include roof tiles, simas, at least two series of antefixes decorated in relief with human busts, a sphinx acroterion, and 10 fragmentary metope plaques with painted representations." The metopes include a large gorgon head and various mythological subjects, inside vertical borders of rosettes. One of the best preserved shows Procne/Aëdon and Philomela/Chelidon preparing Itys/Itylus for the dinner table. Their similarity in style to Corinthian painted pottery of around the 630s BC is the main basis for the dating of the temple, though the clay is local, and the potters may also have been. Some are "inscribed in a mixed alphabet which may well be Aitolian".

There are fragments of two sets of antefixes, the second set with heads of men and silenes, suggesting that the roof was partly renewed or remodelled in the mid-6th century.

Together with the stone metopes of "Temple C" at Selinus in Sicily, of about 550 BC, the metopes of Thermos have been brought into the long-running scholarly discussions over the extent to which the Doric order in stone recreates or imitates earlier buildings in wood. The two sets "are commonly held to be the oldest metopes known so far". It is argued that both sets are too large ("way too high"), at about 90 cm, for the function traditionally assigned to them in the wood-to-stone model, but instead demonstrate that "the Doric frieze was a decorative rather a structural feature" from the start.

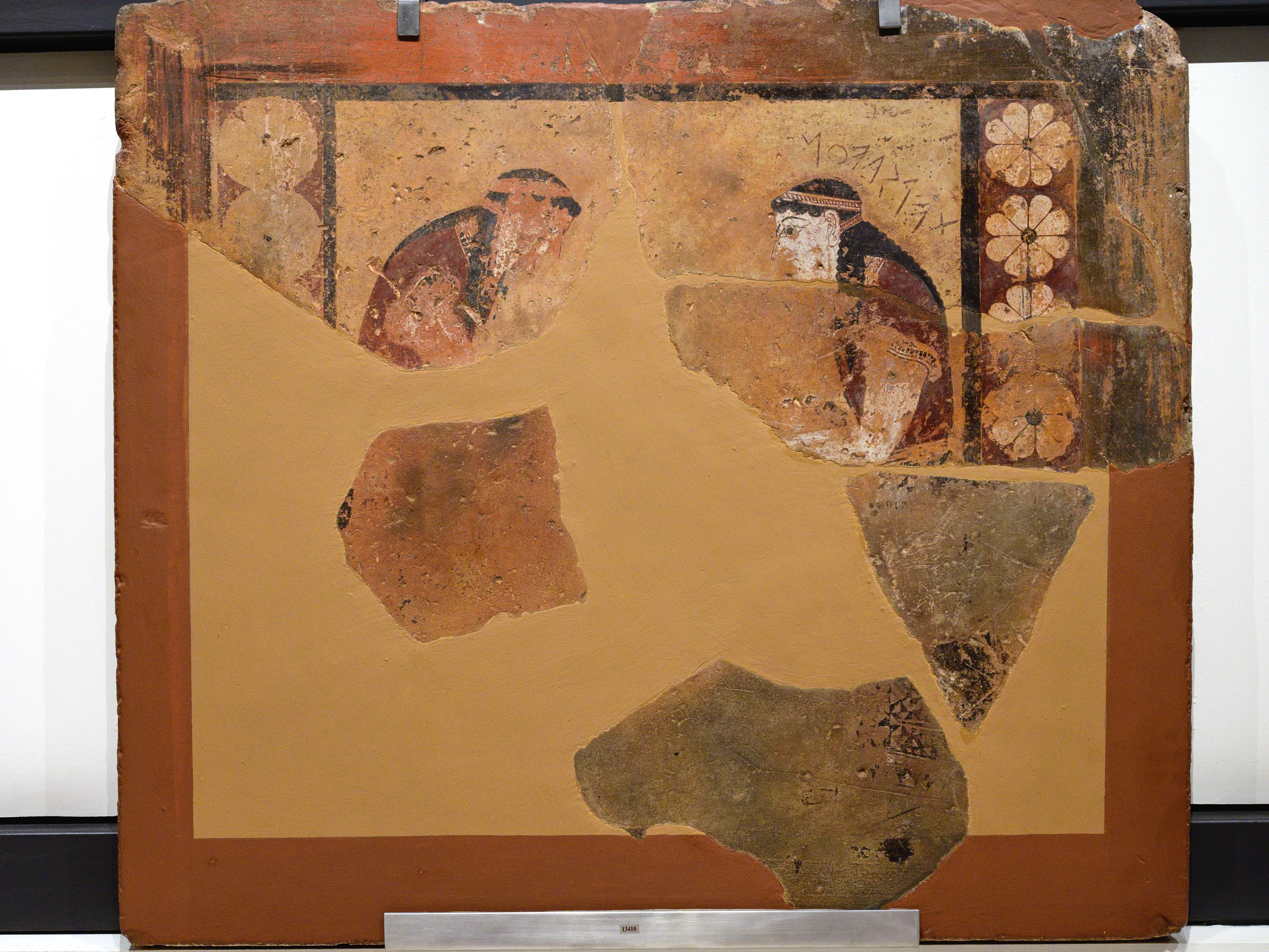
Metope of Procne/Aëdon and Philomela/Chelidon carving up Itys

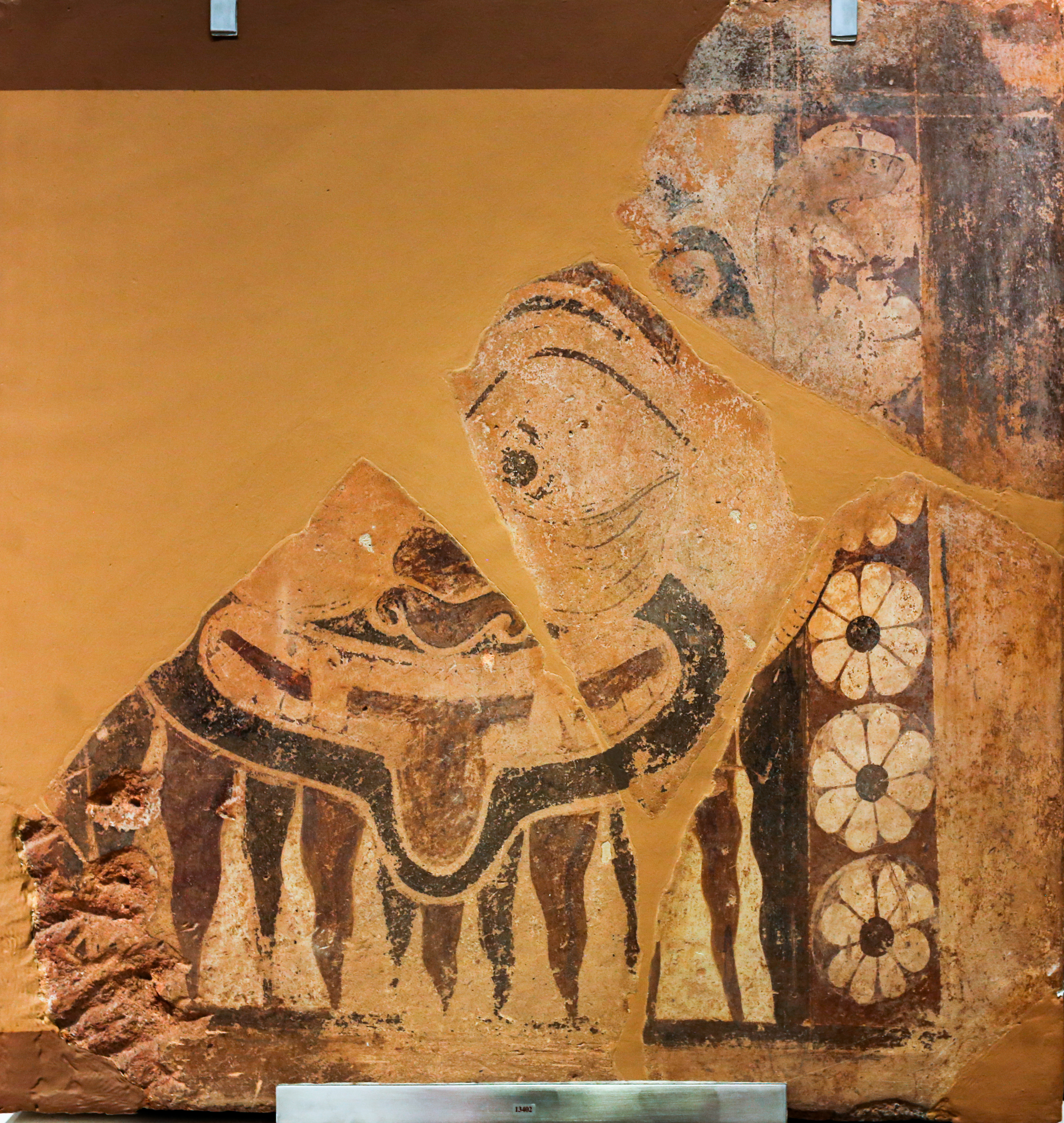
Gorgon's head on a metope

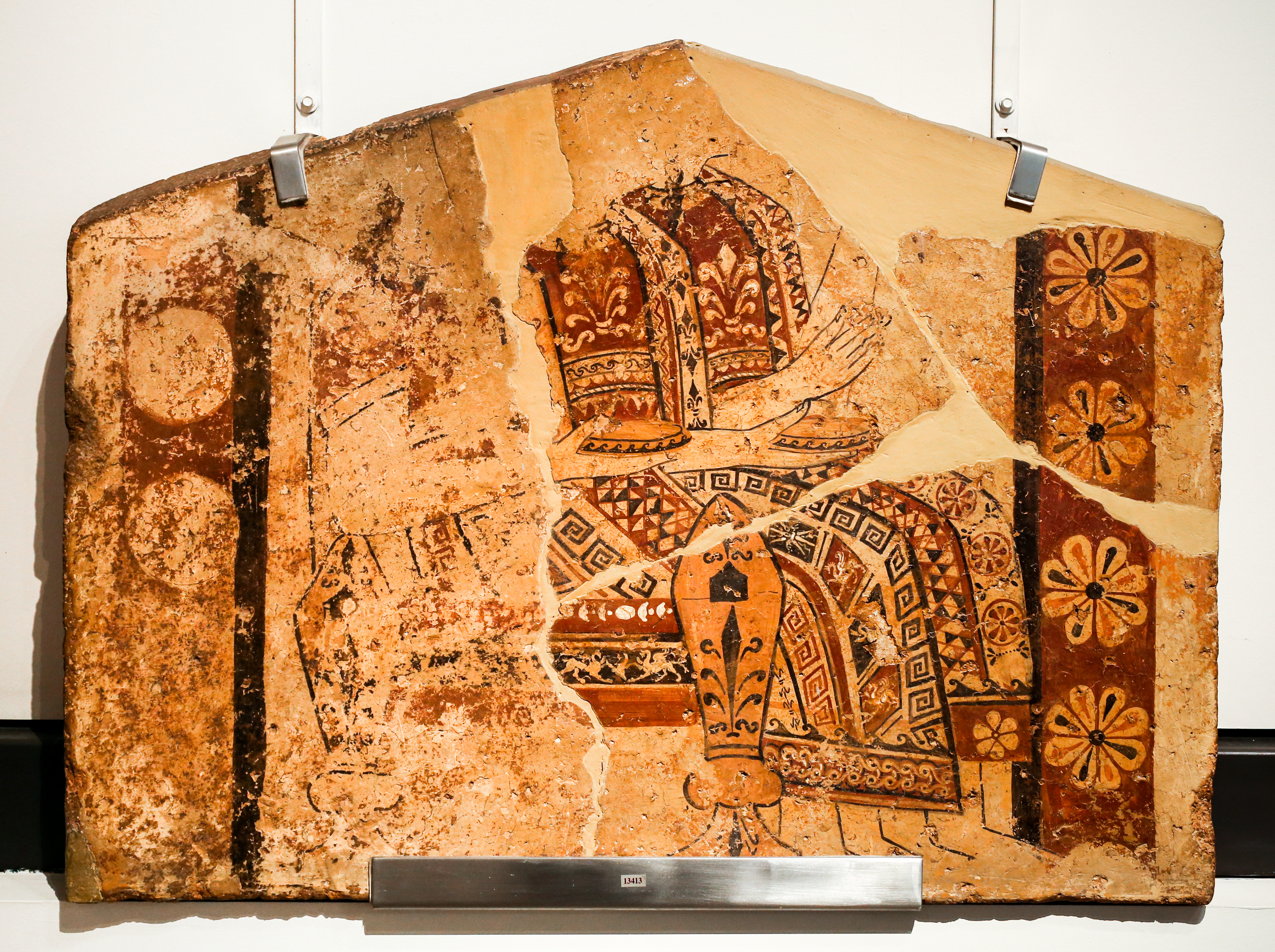
Three sitting women

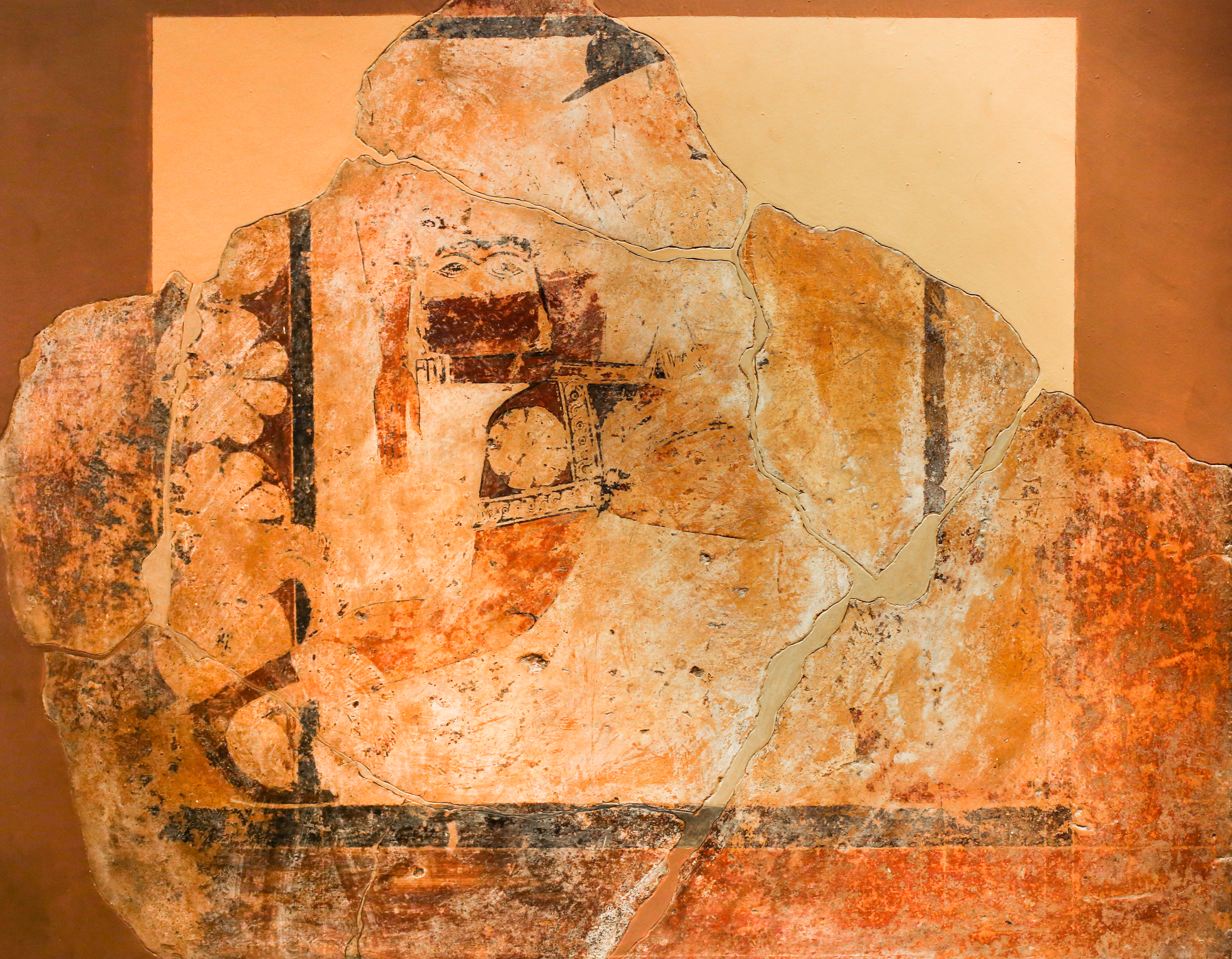
Perseus running with the Gorgon's head

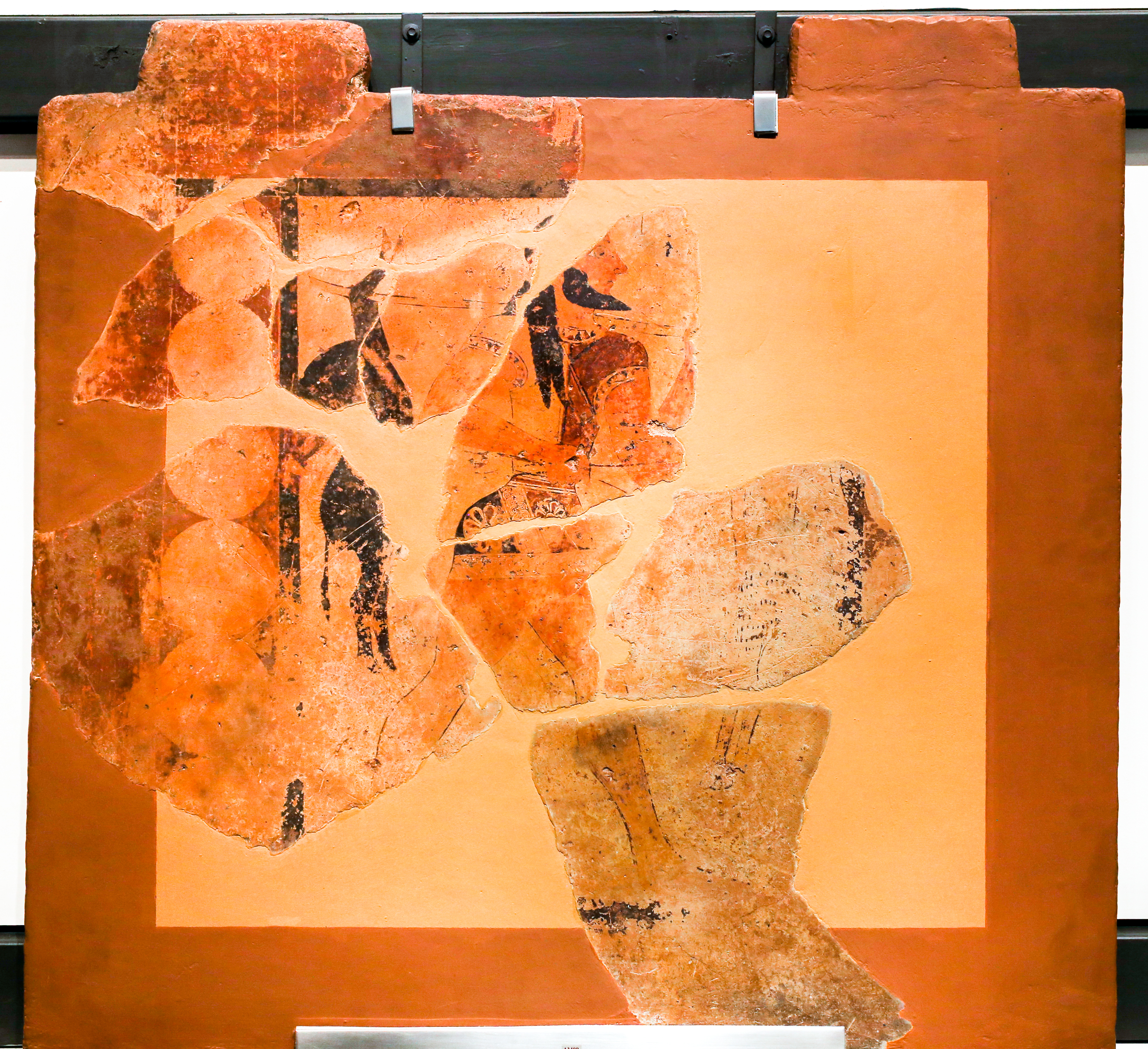
Hunter with his kill (perhaps Orion or Herakles)

== History ==
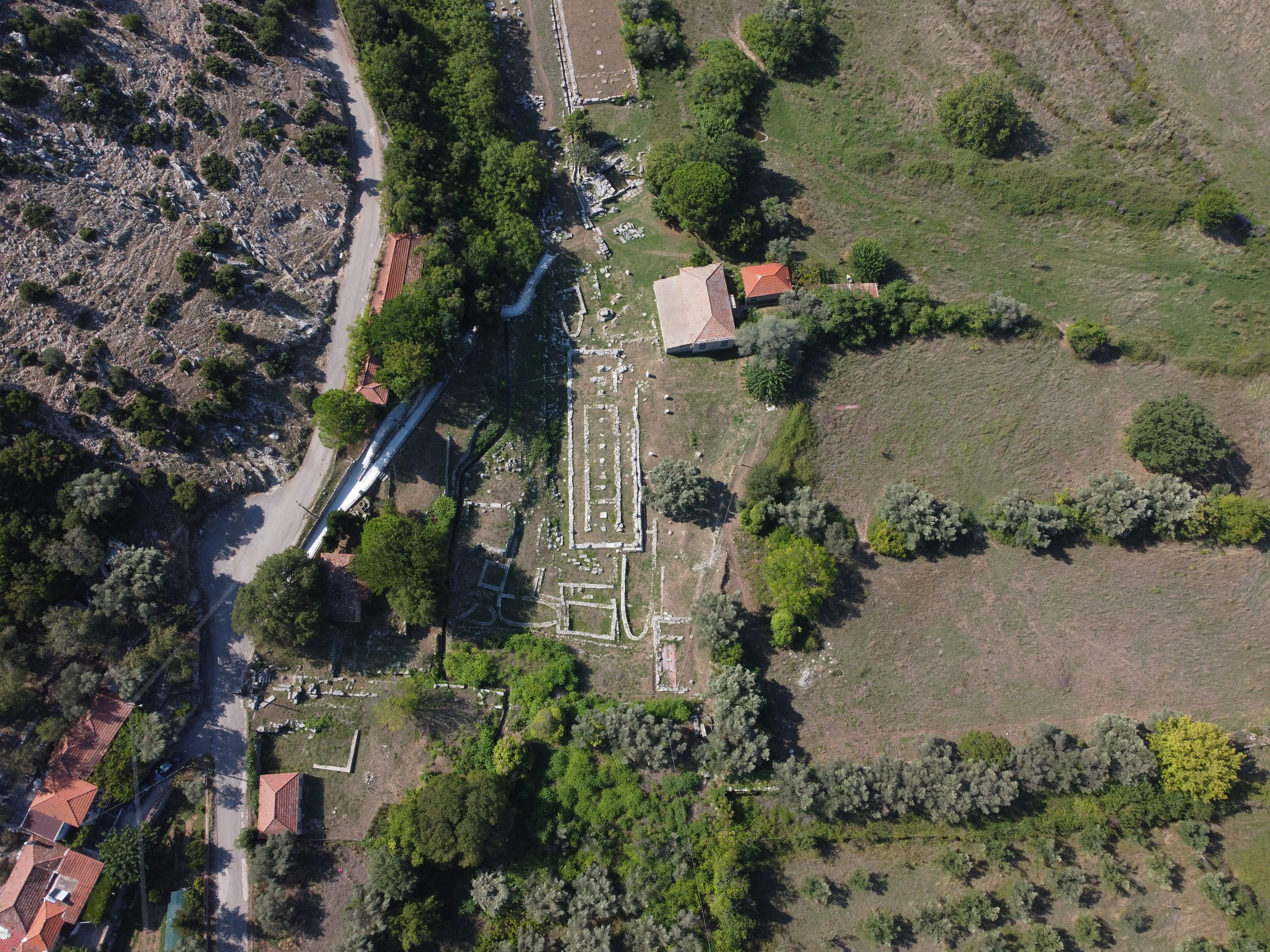
The temple from the air

Thermos was already an important regional centre in the prehistoric period: a long apsidal building (with one rounded end: "Megaron A"), elliptical and square houses with finds of pottery in the Middle Helladic tradition together with imports of high quality Mycenaean pottery can all be dated to the Late Helladic IIA period c. 1500 BC. This settlement continued to flourish throughout the Mycenaean period, even after the destruction of the Mycenaean palaces (LH IIIC, 1200–1100 BC) when a fine krater (large bowl) decorated with warriors in the same style as the well-known Warrior Vase found by Heinrich Schliemann at Mycenae was brought to the site.

A large rectangular building (Megaron B), which underlies the Archaic Temple of Apollo, was long thought to demonstrate the hypothetical development of the Archaic Greek temple form from the Mycenaean palace with the addition of a peristyle (or surrounding colonnade). This was using a tenth-century dating, abandoned many decades ago; statuettes found underneath it date to about 700 BC. In fact, it may have been a lean-to.

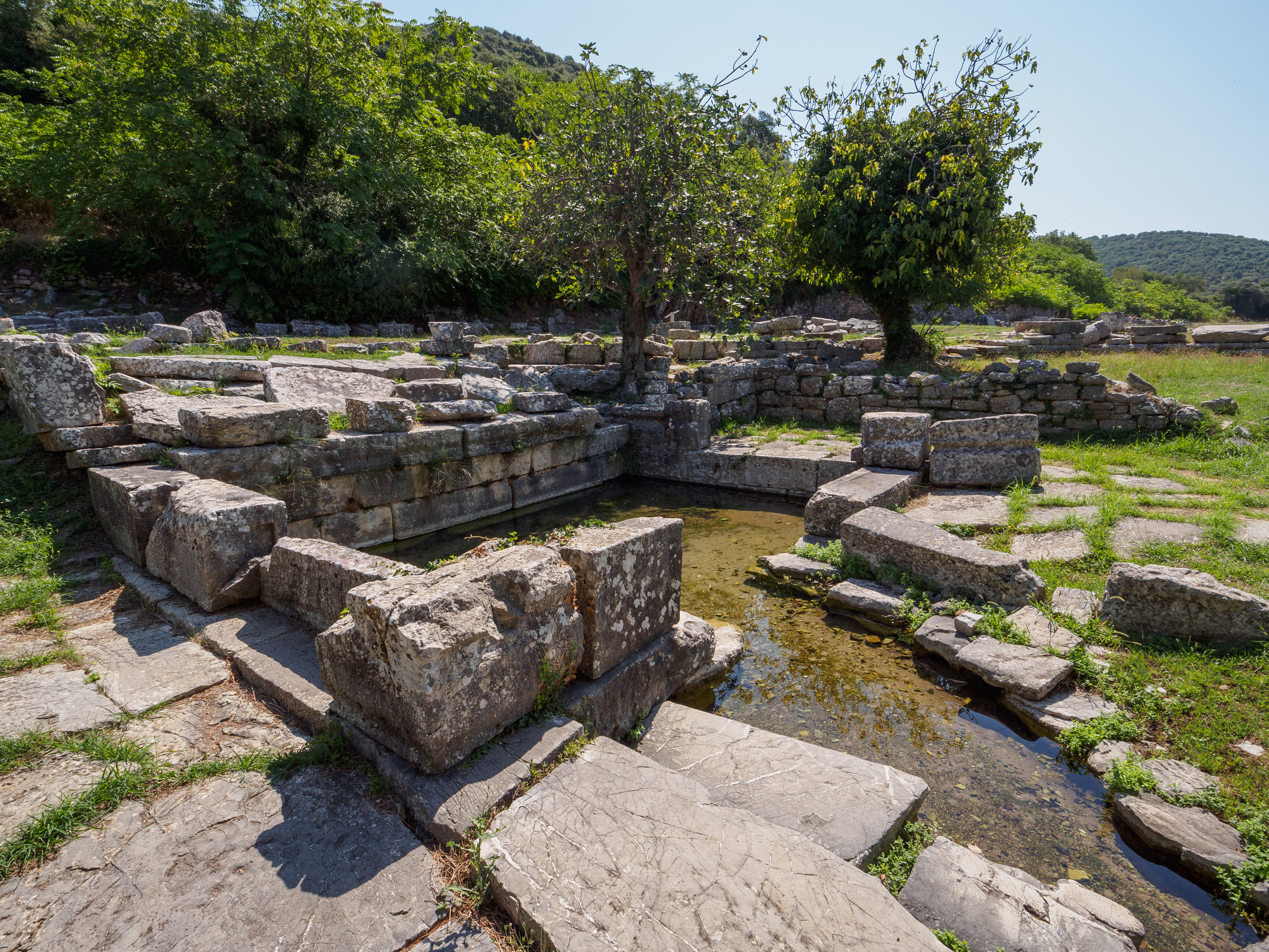
The 3rd-century fountain, seen from the agora

Recent excavations conducted by Professor I. Papapostolou for the Archaeological Society of Athens (Archaiologike Etairia Athenon) have confirmed that a) the building is likely to have been constructed after the end of the Mycenaean period c. 1000–900 BC; b) that the curious horseshoe shaped setting of stone slabs which appeared to surround the Megaron was only put in place after the Megaron had gone out of use and c) that the burnt stratum with the typical offerings of the later Geometric period (800–700 BC), attested at many Greek sanctuary sites such as Olympia and Delphi, intervenes between the slabs and the foundations of the Archaic temple which carried the painted metopes. Thus, although the site of the temple was obviously of special importance from at least the end of the Mycenaean period, there is no demonstrable architectural continuity.

It is not known whether the sanctuary had a formal boundary before the Hellenistic period, when substantial fortification walls with gates and towers were built on three sides of the enclosure. At the same time, three long stoas were built within the precinct, and the spring just to the south of the temple (perhaps the original reason for the location of the site) was enclosed to form a fine stone-lined "fountain" or pool.

The Aetolians at this period embellished the sanctuary with astonishing numbers of bronze dedicatory statues, but today only a few fragments (fingers and toes or horses' hooves) as well as the marble bases on which they stood, survive to illustrate this wealth. Unfortunate political alliances led to the sack of the site first by the King Philip V of Macedon during the Social War (220–217 BC) and then by the Romans in 189 BC, which effectively ended its existence.

By the 1st century BC, burials were being made in the sites of the large public buildings, suggesting the site was abandoned as a sanctuary.
