= Cleothera =

Woman in Greek mythology

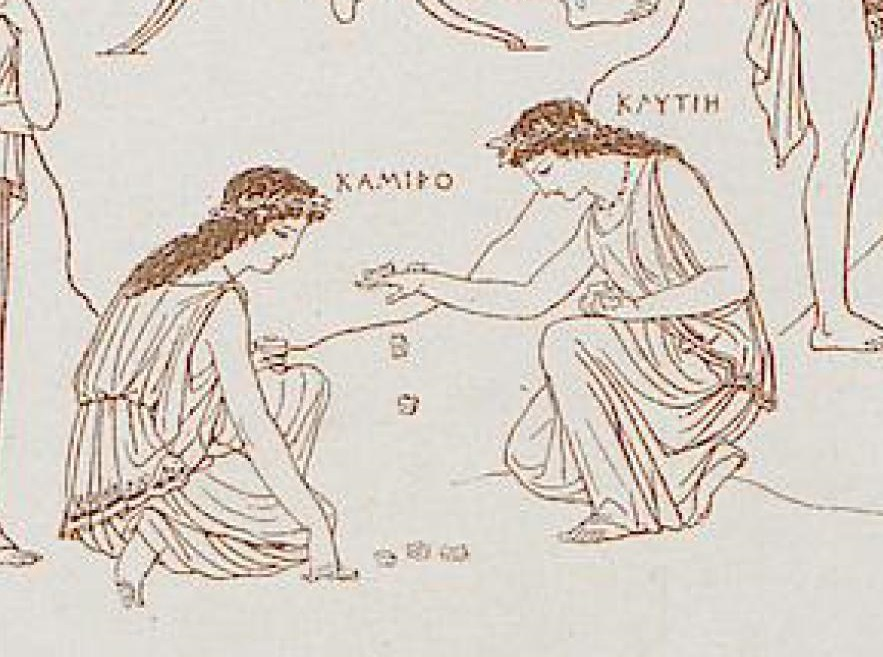
Detail of Camiro and Clytie in a reconstruction of the Nekyia by Polygnotus, 1892

In Greek mythology, Cleothera (Ancient Greek: Κλεόθηρα, romanized: Kleóthēra, lit. 'glory seeker') is one of the daughters of Pandareus and Harmothoë, natives of western Asia Minor or the island of Crete. After the deaths of their parents when the two were young, she and her sister Merope were adopted by Aphrodite, the goddess of love and sensuality, and in time they came to serve the Furies, goddesses of rage and revenge.

== Family ==
Cleothera was a daughter of Pandareus by his wife Harmothoë, and thus sister to Aëdon and Merope. In some authors, Pandareus is also said to have also been the father of Chelidon and an unnamed son, though those versions do not include Cleothera and Merope.

Although Pandareus and his family were said to be from the city of Miletus, sometimes that place was identified with a city in Crete, and not the one in Anatolia, due to Pandareus' Cretan adventures. Furthermore the family is sometimes placed in Ephesus, though those versions do not include Cleothera, and Francis Celoria thinks that the Pandareus from Miletus and the Pandareus from Ephesus were supposed to be different figures.

== Mythology ==
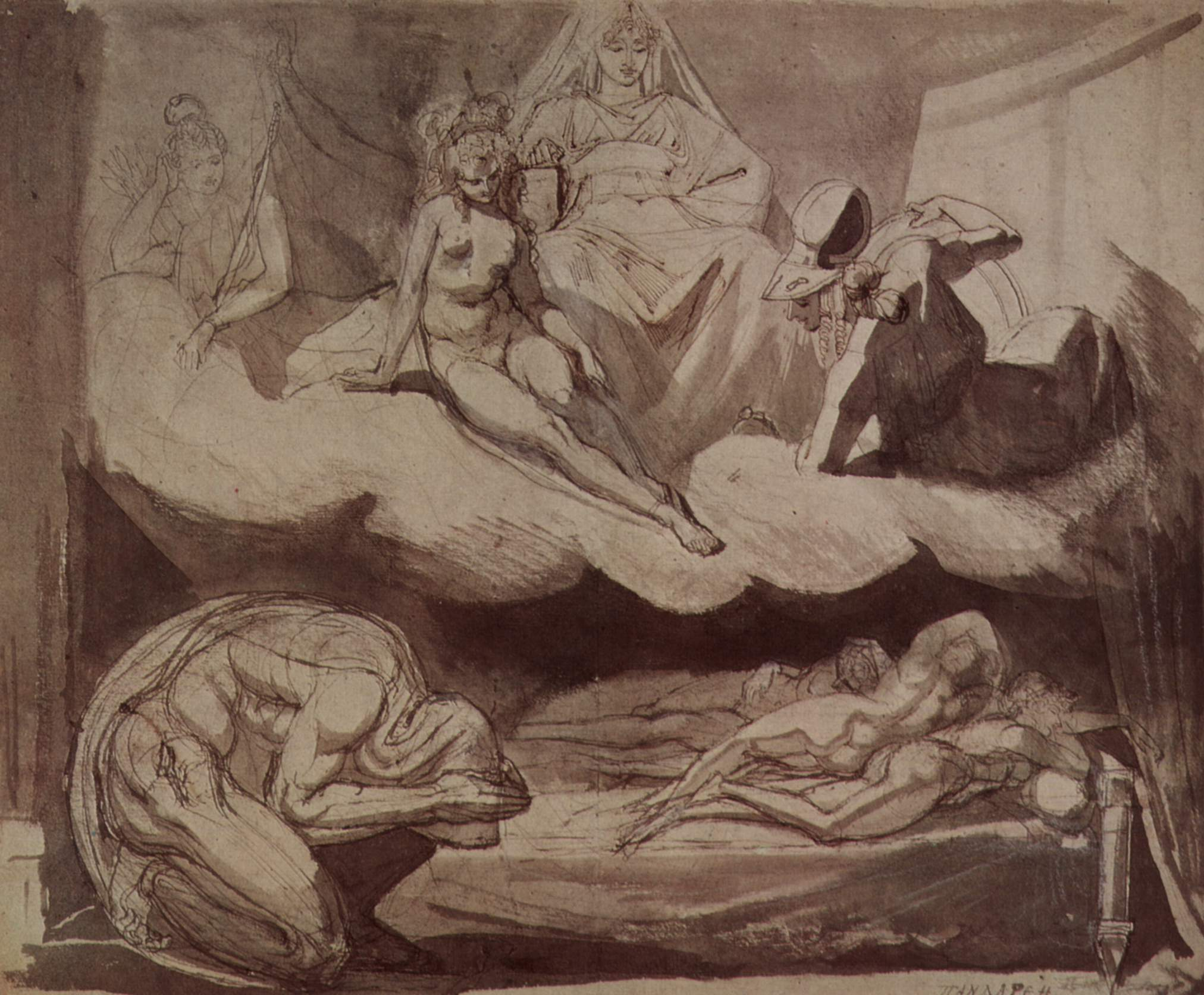
The daughters of Pandareus by Henry Fuseli, c. 1795.

Cleothera was born to Pandareus and Harmothoë who were from either in western Asia Minor or Crete, but her parents were soon forced to flee to Athens and then the island of Sicily when her father incurred the wrath of the king of the gods Zeus by trying to steal from him a sacred golden dog that guarded his temple in Crete. They eventually perished there from Zeus' hands.

After the deaths of their parents, the orphaned Cleothera along with Merope were raised by the goddess Aphrodite, while Aëdon, the eldest daughter, married Zethus, the king of Thebes. The other Olympian goddesses also blessed the girls with multiple gifts and blessings; Hera gave them wisdom and beauty, Artemis high stature, and Athena taught them women's arts and crafts.

Cleothera and her sister both grew to be beautiful women, so when they were of age Aphrodite sought suitable husbands for them. But while she was away in heaven trying to consult Zeus in order to secure them happy marriages, they were kidnapped by the Erinyes with the help of either the winds or the Harpies, and were made handmaidens to them, never to be seen again.

In another version, after the theft of the dog, Pandareus fled with his entire family to Athens and then Sicily, where he and his wife were killed as punishment by Zeus; Zeus then set the Harpies on all three of the girls, apparently including even Aëdon. They snatched and carried them off to the Erinyes, who then made them work for them.

== Iconography ==
The second-century traveller Pausanias mentions an ancient painting of the myth made by Polygnotus, who has labelled the maidens as Cameiro and Clytie instead, and are depicted crowned with flowers and playing dice.

== See also ==
Other kidnapped women in Greek mythology include:

- Hilaeira and Phoebe
- Persephone
- Europa
- Cydippe

== Bibliography ==
- Anonymous, Scholia Antiqua in Homeri Odysseam from Codex Palatinus-Vaticanus, ed. Angelo Mai, Libraria Myliana, 1821. Available at google books.
- Antoninus Liberalis, The Metamorphoses of Antoninus Liberalis translated by Francis Celoria (Routledge 1992). Online version at the Topos Text Project.
- Avery, Catherine B., ed. (1962). New Century Classical Handbook. New York, US: Appleton-Century-Crofts.
- Bell, Robert E. (1991). Women of Classical Mythology: A Biographical Dictionary. ABC-Clio. ISBN 9780874365818.
- Celoria, Francis (October 24, 1992). The Metamorphoses of Antoninus Liberalis: A Translation with a Commentary'. USA, Canada: Routledge. ISBN 0-415-06896-7.
- Dindorf, Wilhelm (1962). Scholia Graeca in Homeri Odysseam Ex Codicibus Aucta Et Emendata. Vol. II. Рипол Классик. ISBN 978-5-87561-491-0.
- Grimal, Pierre (1987). The Dictionary of Classical Mythology. Wiley-Blackwell. ISBN 0-631-13209-0.
- Homer; The Odyssey with an English Translation by A.T. Murray, PH.D. in two volumes. Cambridge, MA., Harvard University Press; London, William Heinemann, Ltd. 1919. Online version at the Perseus Digital Library.
- Pausanias, Pausanias Description of Greece with an English Translation by W.H.S. Jones, Litt.D., and H.A. Ormerod, M.A., in 4 Volumes. Cambridge, MA, Harvard University Press; London, William Heinemann Ltd. 1918. Online version at the Perseus Digital Library.
- Scherf, Johannes (October 1, 2006). "Pandareus". In Cancik, Hubert; Schneider, Helmuth (eds.). Brill's New Pauly. Translated by Christine F. Salazar. Tübingen: Brill Reference Online. ISSN 1574-9347.
- Tripp, Edward (June 1970). Crowell's Handbook of Classical Mythology (1st ed.). Thomas Y. Crowell Co. ISBN 069022608X.
