= Demophon of Elaeus =

Mythological king of Elaeus

Demophon (Ancient Greek: Δημοφῶν, romanized: Dēmophôn, lit. 'voice of the people') is a king of Elaeus in Thrace from ancient Greek and Roman mythology. In order to combat a deadly disease that plagued his city, Demophon sacrificed the daughters of noblemen, an act that enraged Mastusius, the father of one of the victims, who then sought revenge.

Demophon's tale is only known through De astronomia, a Roman work attributed to Gaius Julius Hyginus, but it originates from the works of an earlier Greek writer, Phylarchus.

== Mythology ==
Demophon ruled the Greek colony of Elaeus in the Thracian Chersonnese (now known as the Gallipoli peninsula) when a destructive plague hit the city, claiming the lives of many people. Troubled, he sought the advice of the oracle of Apollo, and the god informed him that each year they had to sacrifice a nobleborn maiden to their ancestral gods in order to stop it. Demophon did as told and selected the unfortunate girls by lot, but he always made sure to exclude his own daughters.

This went on until a nobleman named Mastusius took offence and declared he would not have his daughter entered in the drawing unless Demophon's daughters were as well. Demophon was enraged, so he sacrificed Mastusius' daughter without drawing lots at all. Mastusius was greatly angered, but he concealed his resentment out of patriotism for some time, claiming his daughter might have ended up being chosen anyway. Demophon himself forgot the incident as Mastusius adopted an amicable endeavor around him, so when Mastusius invited him and his daughters for a solemn sacrifice, he agreed.

Demophon told his daughters to go first ahead of him, as he still had some duties to attend to before he could go. Mastusius seized the girls when they arrived and killed them all, and then had their blood mixed with wine in a bowl. When Demophon arrived, he asked for his daughters, and the bowl was offered to him to drink. When he learnt what had happened, he ordered both Mastusius and the bowl to be thrown into the sea; the cape was called Mastusian after the nobleman, and the harbour the Bowl after the wine vessel. The bowl also found a place among the stars too, as the constellation Crater (The Wine-cup).

== Culture ==
This myth is only preserved in the first-century work De astronomia by Roman author Gaius Julius Hyginus, who attributes it to Phylarchus, a Greek historian of the third century BC, and characterised as an example of Phylarchus' taste for sensational tales. The story might also tie to Phylarchus' claim that it was common to sacrifice people when setting out against an enemy, and his tendency to conflate mythological and historical facts like the sphagia, ritual sacrifices of animals that did take place.

Demophon's story was used in antiquity to teach a moral lesson about the persistence of hatred. This myth is one of the several where virginity causes the death of young girls due to them being led to a willing or, more often, unwilling sacrificial role; for young Greek girls, those stories were used to reinforce their sense that their value was defined by their virginity.

== See also ==
- Child cannibalism

Other fathers who were tricked into consuming their children:

- Thyestes
- Tereus
- Polytechnus

== Bibliography ==
- Abbott, Elizabeth (2001). A History of Celibacy. Cambridge, UK: The Lutterworth Press. ISBN 0-7188-3006-7.
- Avery, Catherine B., ed. (1962). New Century Classical Handbook. New York, US: Appleton-Century-Crofts.
- Condos, Theony (1997). Star Myths of the Greeks and Romans: A Sourcebook. Grand Rapids, Michigan: Phanes Press. ISBN 978-1609256784.
- Grant, Michael; Hazel, John (August 2, 2004). Who's Who in Classical Mythology. London and New York: Routledge. ISBN 0-415-26041-8.
- Hughes, Dennis D. (1991). Human Sacrifice in Ancient Greece. USA and Canada: Routledge. ISBN 0-415-03483-3.
- Hyginus, Astronomica from The Myths of Hyginus translated and edited by Mary Grant. University of Kansas Publications in Humanistic Studies. Online version at the Topos Text Project.
- Farrington, Scott T. (2016). "The Tragic Phylarchus". In Liotsakis, Vasileios; Farrington, Scott T. (eds.). The Art of History: Literary Perspectives on Greek and Roman Historiography. Berlin, Boston: De Gruyter. ISBN 978-3-11-049526-3.
- March, Jennifer R. (May 31, 2014). Dictionary of Classical Mythology. Oxbow Books. ISBN 978-1-78297-635-6.
- Smith, William (1873). A Dictionary of Greek and Roman Biography and Mythology. London, UK: John Murray, printed by Spottiswoode and Co. Online version at the Perseus.tufts library.
- Tripp, Edward (June 1970). Crowell's Handbook of Classical Mythology (1st ed.). Thomas Y. Crowell Co. ISBN 069022608X.
