= Clytie =

Name list

In Greek mythology, the name Clytie (Ancient Greek: Κλυτίη, Ionic) or Clytia (Κλυτία, Attic and other dialects) may refer to:

- Clytie (Oceanid), known for her unrequited love for Helios. Out of jealousy, Clytie arranged the death of Leucothoe, Helios' lover.
- Clytie, daughter of Pandareus and sister of Cameiro. Cameiro and Clytie (in other versions known as Cleothera and Merope) lost their parents to the wrath of gods and were reared by Aphrodite. They received gifts from other Olympic goddesses as well: wisdom and beauty from Hera, high stature from Artemis, skill in handiwork from Athena. When Aphrodite left for Olympus to arrange for the sisters to get happily married in the future, the girls, left without supervision, were abducted by the Harpies and given by them to the Erinyes.
- Clytie, daughter of Merops, wife of Eurypylus of Cos, mother of Chalcon and Antagoras. She received Demeter as guest.
- Clytie, daughter of Amphidamas and possible mother of Pelops by Tantalus.
- Clytie, possible mother of Myrtilus by Hermes.
- Clytie, one of the Niobids.
- Clytie, in one source called mother of Thalpius by Eurytus instead of Theraephone.
- Clytie or Phthia, concubine of Amyntor, the cause of a conflict between him and his son Phoenix.
- Clytia, mother of Medea by Aeetes. Otherwise, the wife of Aeetes was called Ipsia, Idyia, Asterodeia, Hecate, Neaera or Eurylyte.
