= Erinyes =

Chthonic female deities of vengeance in Greek mythology

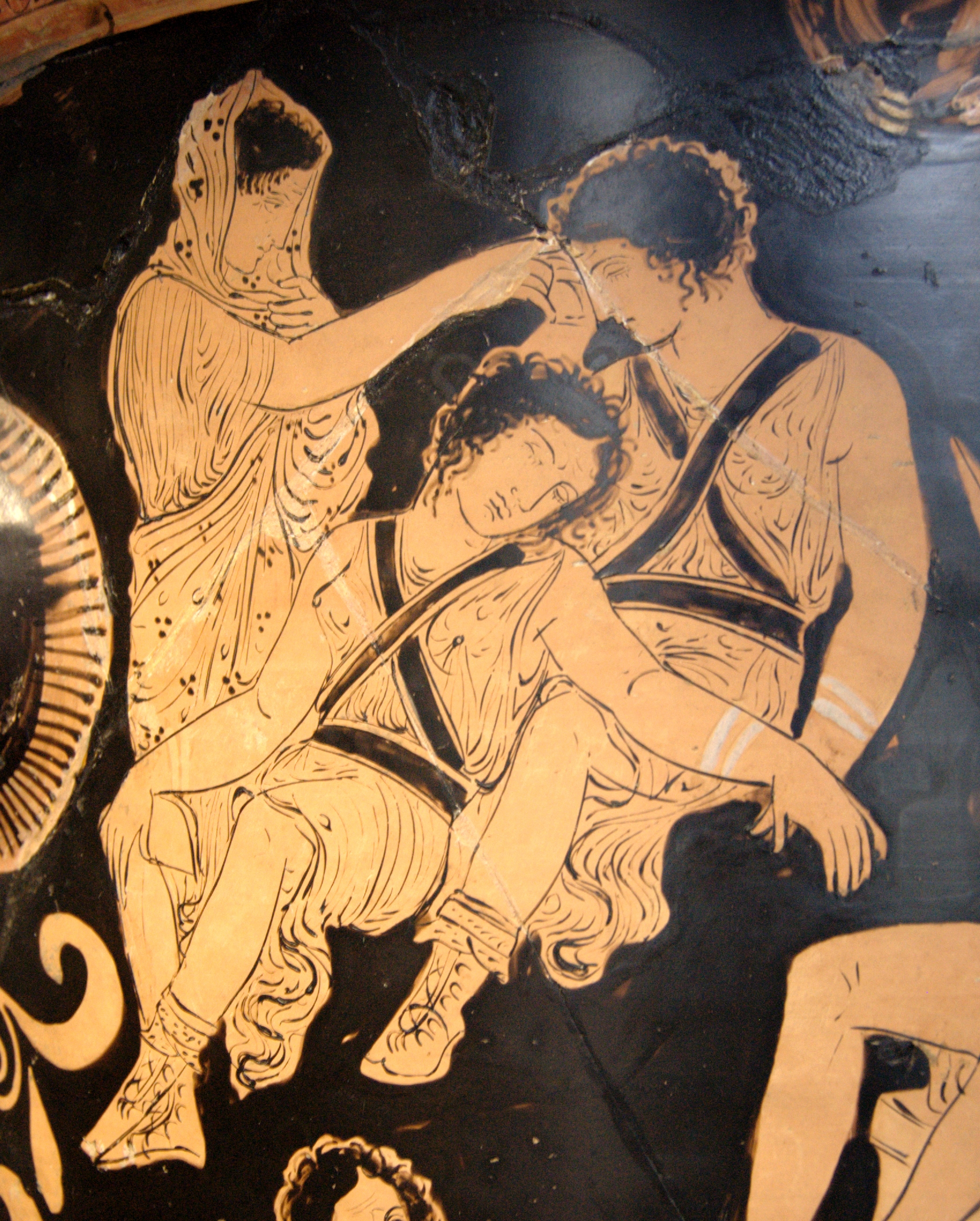
Clytemnestra tries to awaken the sleeping Erinyes. Detail from an Apulian red-figure bell-krater, 380–370 BC.

The Erinyes (/ɪˈrɪni.iːz/ ih-RI-nee-eez; Ancient Greek: Ἐρινύες, sing. Ἐρινύς Erinys), also known as the Eumenides (Εὐμενίδες, the "Gracious ones"), (Note: To avoid uttering their names, the ancient Greeks also used euphemistic titles, such as Eumenides in Sicyon and Semnai (Σεμναί), the "August ones", in Athens.) are chthonic goddesses of vengeance in ancient Greek religion and mythology. A formulaic oath in the Iliad invokes them as "the Erinyes, that under earth take vengeance on men, whosoever hath sworn a false oath". Walter Burkert suggests that they are "an embodiment of the act of self-cursing contained in the oath". Their Roman counterparts are the Furies, also known as the Dirae. The Roman writer Maurus Servius Honoratus (c. 400 AD) wrote that they are called "Eumenides" in hell, "Furiae" on Earth, and "Dirae" in heaven. Erinyes are akin to some other Greek deities, called Poenai.

According to Hesiod's Theogony, when the Titan Cronus castrated his father, Uranus, and threw his genitalia into the sea, the Erinyes (along with the Giants and the Meliae) emerged from the drops of blood which fell on the Earth (Gaia), while Aphrodite was born from the crests of sea foam. Apollodorus also reports this lineage. According to variant accounts, they are the daughters of Nyx ('Night'), while in Virgil's Aeneid, they are daughters of Pluto and Nox (the Roman name for Nyx). In some accounts, they were the daughters of Eurynome (a name for Earth) and Cronus, or of Earth and Phorcys (i.e., the sea). In Orphic literature, they are the daughters of Hades and Persephone.

Their number is usually left indeterminate. Virgil, probably working from an Alexandrian source, recognized three: Alecto or Alekto ("endless anger"), Megaera or Megaira ("jealous rage"), and Tisiphone or Tilphousia ("vengeful destruction"), all of whom appear in the Aeneid. Dante Alighieri followed Virgil in depicting the same three-character triptych of Erinyes; in Canto IX of the Inferno, they confront the poets at the gates of the city of Dis. Whilst the Erinyes were usually described as three maiden goddesses, "Telphousia" (a name for Erinys) was a byname for the wrathful goddess Demeter, who was worshipped under the title of Erinys in the Arcadian town of Thelpusa.

== Etymology ==
The word Erinyes is of uncertain etymology; connections with the verb ὀρίνειν orinein, "to raise, stir, excite", and the noun ἔρις eris, "strife" have been suggested; Robert Beekes suggests that the word probably has a Pre-Greek origin. The word Erinys in the singular and as a theonym is first attested in Mycenaean Greek, written in Linear B, in the following forms: 𐀁𐀪𐀝, e-ri-nu, and 𐀁𐀪𐀝𐀸, e-ri-nu-we. These words are found on the KN Fp 1, KN V 52, and KN Fh 390 tablets.

== Description ==
The Erinyes live in Erebus and are more ancient than any of the Olympian deities. Their task is to hear complaints brought by mortals against the insolence of the young to the aged, of children to parents, of hosts to guests, and of householders or city councils to suppliants—and to punish such crimes by haunting culprits relentlessly. The appearance of the Erinyes differs between sources, though they are frequently described as wearing black. In Aesychlus' Eumenides, the Priestess of Pythian Apollo compares their monstrosity to that of the gorgon and harpies, but adds that they are wingless, with hatred dripping from their eyes. Euripides, on the other hand, gives them wings, as does Virgil. They are often envisaged as having snakes in their hair.

The Erinyes are commonly associated with night and darkness. With varying accounts claiming that they are the daughters of Nyx, the goddess of night, they're also associated with darkness in the works of Aeschylus and Euripides in both their physical appearance and the time of day that they manifest.

Description of Tisiphone in Statius' Thebaid:

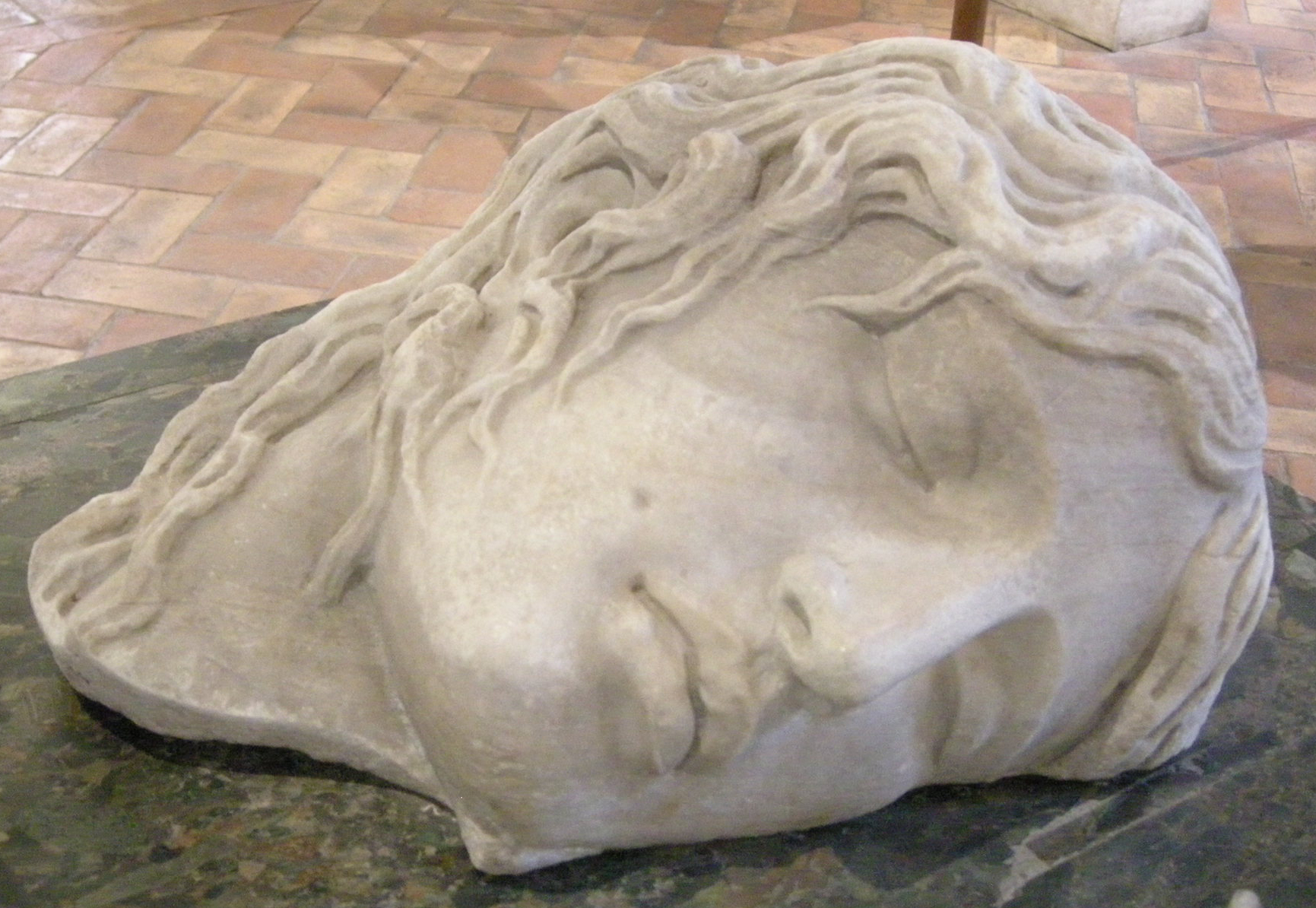
Altemps, sleeping Erinyes

So prayed he, and the cruel goddess turned her grim visage to hearken. By chance she sat beside dismal Cocytus, and had loosed the snakes from her head and suffered them to lap the sulphurous waters. Straightway, faster than fire of Jove or falling stars she leapt up from the gloomy bank: the crowd of phantoms gives way before her, fearing to meet their queen; then, journeying through the shadows and the fields dark with trooping ghosts, she hastens to the gate of Taenarus, whose threshold none may cross and again return. Day felt her presence, Night interposed her pitchy cloud and startled his shining steeds; far off towering Atlas shuddered and shifted the weight of heaven upon his trembling shoulders. Forthwith rising aloft from Malea's vale she hies her on the well-known way to Thebes: for on no errand is she swifter to go and to return, not kindred Tartarus itself pleases her so well. A hundred horned snakes erect shaded her face, the thronging terror of her awful head; deep within her sunken eyes there glows a light of iron hue, as when Atracian spells make travailing Phoebe redden through the clouds; suffused with venom, her skin distends and swells with corruption; a fiery vapour issues from her evil mouth, bringing upon mankind thirst unquenchable and sickness and famine and universal death. From her shoulders falls a stark and grisly robe, whose dark fastenings meet upon her breast: Atropos and Proserpine herself fashion her this garb anew. Then both her hands are shaken in wrath, the one gleaming with a funeral torch, the other lashing the air with a live water-snake.

== Cult ==
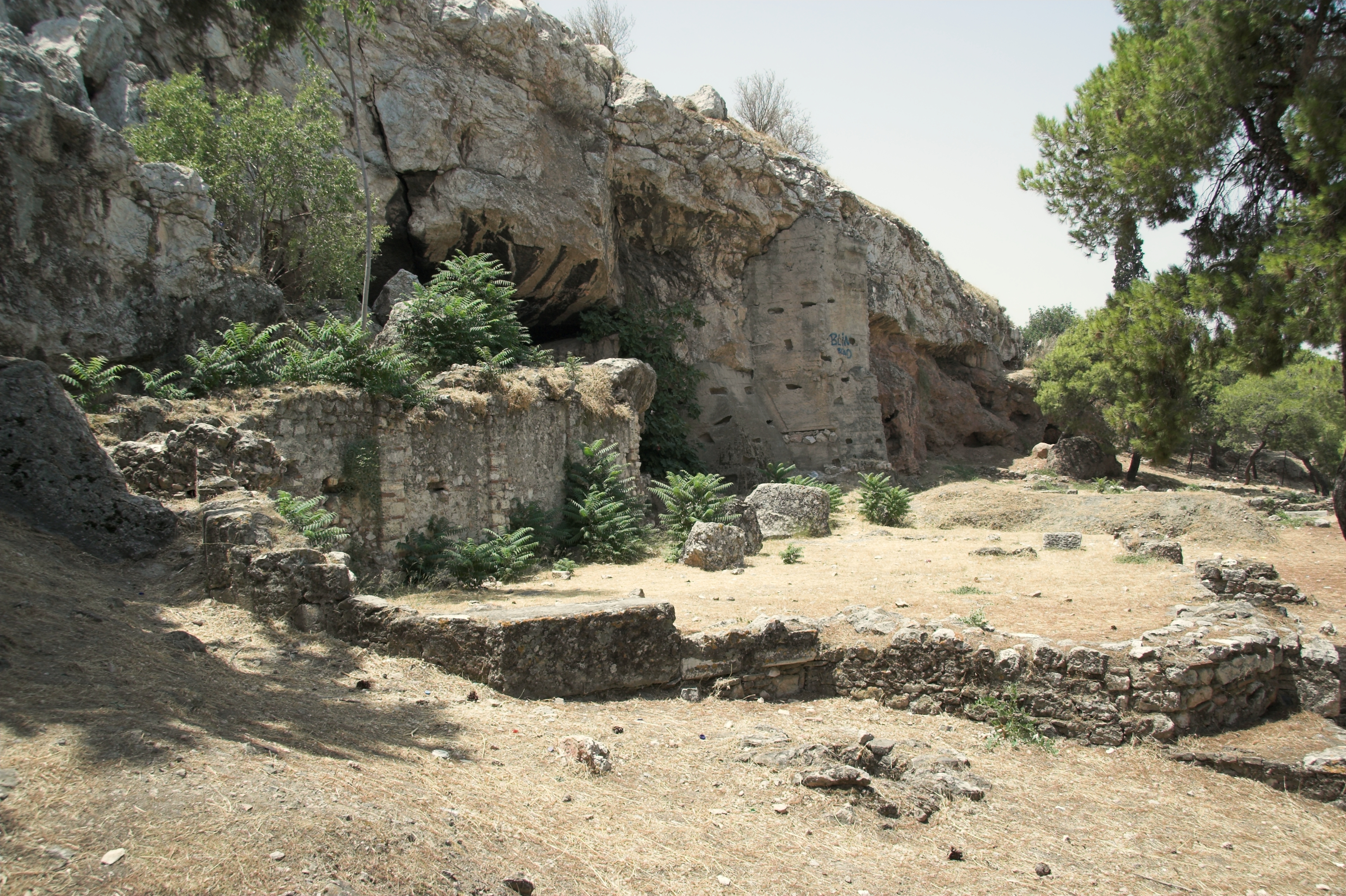
Shrine of Erinyes under Areopagus, Athens

Pausanias describes a sanctuary in Athens dedicated to the Erinyes under the name Semnai:

Hard by [the Areopagos the murder court of Athens] is a sanctuary of the goddesses which the Athenians call the August, but Hesiod in the Theogony calls them Erinyes (Furies). It was Aeschylus who first represented them with snakes in their hair. But on the images neither of these nor of any of the under-world deities is there anything terrible. There are images of Pluto, Hermes, and Earth, by which sacrifice those who have received an acquittal on the Hill of Ares; sacrifices are also offered on other occasions by both citizens and aliens.

The Orphic Hymns, a collection of 87 religious poems as translated by Thomas Taylor, contains two stanzas regarding the Erinyes. Hymn 68 refers to them as the Erinyes, while hymn 69 refers to them as the Eumenides.

Hymn 68, to the Erinyes:

Vociferous Bacchanalian Furies [Erinyes], hear! Ye, I invoke, dread pow'rs, whom all revere; Nightly, profound, in secret who retire, Tisiphone, Alecto, and Megara dire: Deep in a cavern merg'd, involv'd in night, near where Styx flows impervious to the sight; Ever attendant on mysterious rites, furious and fierce, whom Fate's dread law delights; Revenge and sorrows dire to you belong, hid in a savage veil, severe and strong, Terrific virgins, who forever dwell endu'd with various forms, in deepest hell; Aerial, and unseen by human kind, and swiftly coursing, rapid as the mind. In vain the Sun with wing'd refulgence bright, in vain the Moon, far darting milder light, Wisdom and Virtue may attempt in vain; and pleasing, Art, our transport to obtain Unless with these you readily conspire, and far avert your all-destructive ire. The boundless tribes of mortals you descry, and justly rule with Right's [Dike's] impartial eye. Come, snaky-hair'd, Fates [Moirai] many-form'd, divine, suppress your rage, and to our rites incline.

Hymn 69, to the Eumenides:

Hear me, illustrious Furies [Eumenides], mighty nam'd, terrific pow'rs, for prudent counsel fam'd; Holy and pure, from Jove terrestrial [Zeus Khthonios](Hades) born and Proserpine [Phersephone], whom lovely locks adorn: Whose piercing sight, with vision unconfin'd, surveys the deeds of all the impious kind: On Fate attendant, punishing the race (with wrath severe) of deeds unjust and base. Dark-colour'd queens, whose glittering eyes, are bright with dreadful, radiant, life-destroying, light: Eternal rulers, terrible and strong, to whom revenge, and tortures dire belong; Fatal and horrid to the human sight, with snaky tresses wand'ring in the night; Either approach, and in these rites rejoice, for ye, I call, with holy, suppliant voice.

== In ancient Greek literature ==
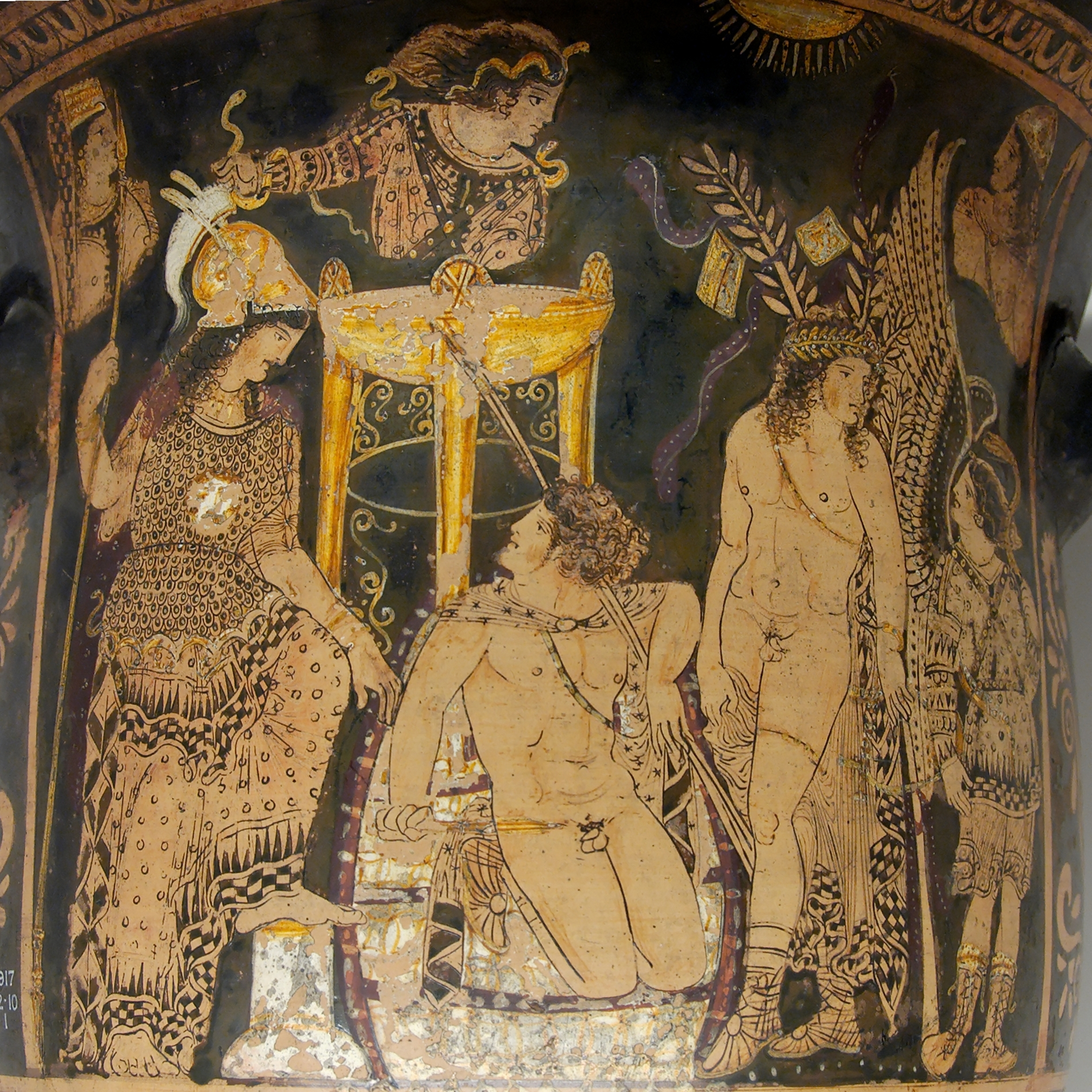
Orestes at Delphi, flanked by Athena and Pylades, among the Erinyes and priestesses of the oracle. Paestan red-figure bell-krater, c. 330 BC.

Myth fragments dealing with the Erinyes are found among the earliest extant records of ancient Greek culture. The Erinyes are featured prominently in the myth of Orestes, which recurs frequently throughout many works of ancient Greek literature.

=== Aeschylus ===
Featured in ancient Greek literature, from poems to plays, the Erinyes form the Chorus and play a major role in the conclusion of Aeschylus's dramatic trilogy the Oresteia. In the first play, Agamemnon, King Agamemnon returns home from the Trojan War, where he is slain by his wife, Clytemnestra, who wants vengeance for her daughter Iphigenia, whom Agamemnon had sacrificed to obtain favorable winds to sail to Troy. In the second play, The Libation Bearers, their son Orestes has reached manhood and has been commanded by Apollo's oracle to avenge his father's murder at his mother's hand. Returning home and revealing himself to his sister Electra, Orestes pretends to be a messenger bringing the news of his own death to Clytemnestra. He then slays his mother and her lover Aegisthus. Although Orestes' actions were what Apollo had commanded him to do, Orestes has still committed matricide, a grave sacrilege. Because of this, he is pursued and tormented by the terrible Erinyes, who demand yet further blood vengeance.

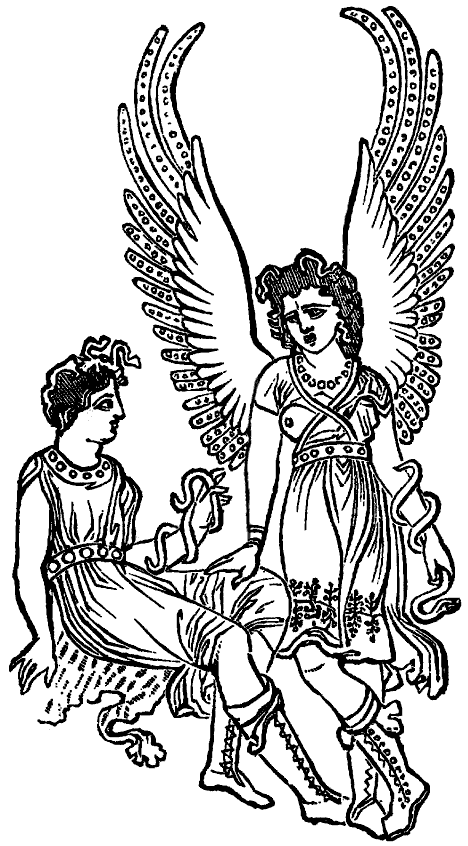
Two Furies, from a nineteenth-century book reproducing an image from an ancient vase.

In The Eumenides, Orestes is told by Apollo at Delphi that he should go to Athens to seek the aid of the goddess Athena. In Athens, Athena arranges for Orestes to be tried by a jury of Athenian citizens, with her presiding. The Erinyes appear as Orestes' accusers, while Apollo speaks in his defense. The trial becomes a debate about the necessity of blood vengeance, the honor that is due to a mother compared to that due to a father, and the respect that must be paid to ancient deities such as the Erinyes compared to the newer generation of Apollo and Athena. The jury vote is evenly split. Athena participates in the vote and chooses for acquittal. Athena declares Orestes acquitted because of the rules she established for the trial. Despite the verdict, the Erinyes threaten to torment all inhabitants of Athens and to poison the surrounding countryside. Athena, however, offers the ancient goddesses a new role, as protectors of justice, rather than vengeance, and of the city. She persuades them to break the cycle of blood for blood (except in the case of war, which is fought for glory, not vengeance). While promising that the goddesses will receive due honor from the Athenians and Athena, she also reminds them that she possesses the key to the storehouse where Zeus keeps the thunderbolts that defeated the other older deities. This mixture of bribes and veiled threats satisfies the Erinyes, who are then led by Athena in a procession to their new abode. In the play, the "Furies" are thereafter addressed as "Semnai" (Venerable Ones), as they will now be honored by the citizens of Athens and ensure the city's prosperity.

=== Euripides ===
In Euripides' Orestes the Erinyes are for the first time "equated" with the 'Eumenides' (Εὐμενίδες, pl. of Εὐμενίς; literally "the gracious ones", but also translated as "Kindly Ones"). This is because it was considered unwise to mention them by name (for fear of attracting their attention); the ironic name is similar to how Hades, god of the dead is styled Pluton, or Pluto, "the Rich One". Using euphemisms for the names of deities serves many religious purposes.

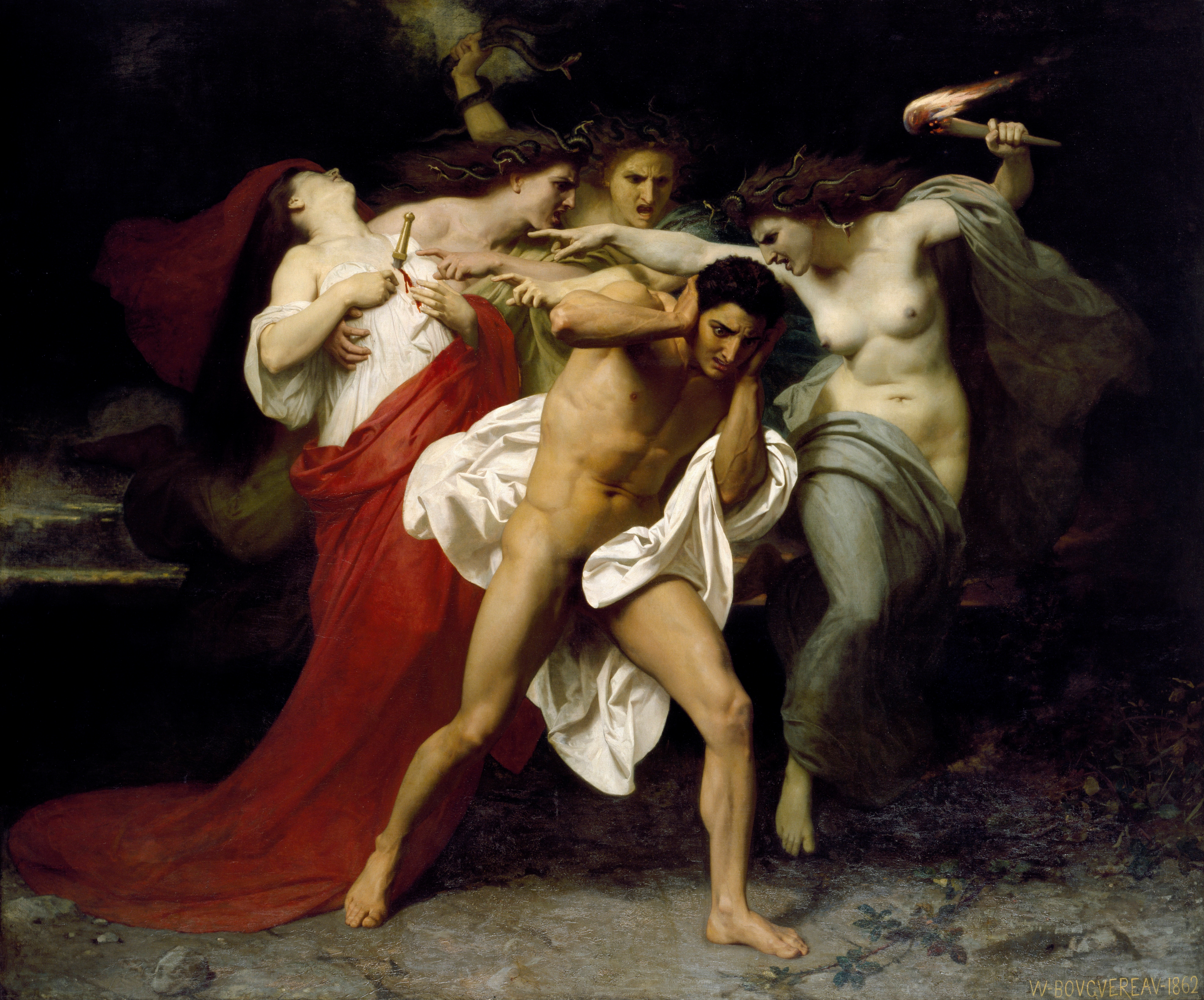
The Remorse of Orestes, where he is surrounded by the Erinyes, by William-Adolphe Bouguereau, 1862

=== Other ===
According to the Odyssey and later scholia on it, the Erinyes once snatched Pandareus' daughters Cleothera and Merope, who after the death of the parents had been adopted by Aphrodite. While the goddess was trying to arrange suitable matches for them once they became of age, the Erinyes with the help of the wind gods or the Harpies carried away the girls and made them their handmaidens.

== See also ==
- Horkos – Personification in Greek mythology
- Styx#Oath of the gods – Goddess and river in Greek mythology
