= Polytechnus =

Greek mythological figure

In Greek mythology, Polytechnus (Ancient Greek: Πολύτεχνος, romanized: Polútekhnos, lit. 'he of many arts') is a carpenter from Colophon, a city on the western coast of Asia Minor. He is the husband of Aëdon and brother-in-law of Chelidon. Polytechnus serves as the doublet of Tereus in an Anatolian variant of the story of Philomela and Procne, the Athenian princesses who cut down a child in order to take revenge against his father for his crime of rape. Unlike the sisters, Polytechnus is not transformed into the same bird as his counterpart Tereus did, the hoopoe.

== Mythology ==
Polytechnus was a humble carpenter living in Colophon, and at some point he was given a gift axe by Hephaestus himself, the god of craftsmanship. He was married to Aëdon, the daughter of Pandareus of Ephesus. The couple had a son named Itys, and for a time they were happy until they boasted of being a more blessed couple than even Zeus and Hera. The divine royal couple, much offended by their hubris, sent them the goddess Eris to bring strife and discord in their once peaceful home.

At the time, Polytechnus was completing a standing board for a chariot and Aëdon a tapestry, so they made a wager that whoever finished their work first would need to find the other a female slave. With Hera's help, Aëdon was victorious. Polytechnus was bitter about his wife's victory, so he went to Pandareus, and lied about Aëdon sending him to fetch her sister, Chelidon. Pandareus without suspecting a thing let Polytechnus take her with him, and he then raped Chelidon, cut her hair short and gave her rugs to wear, terrorising her into silence under pain of death. He then gave her to Aëdon as her prize.

For a time all went according to his plan with Polytechnus' wife none the wiser, until one day Aëdon overheard Chelidon bitterly lamenting her woes by some spring, and finally recognised her sister. Aëdon then cut their son Itys down, and served him to Polytechnus while she and Chelidon ran to their father and explained what had happened. Furious, Polytechus ran after them once he realised what had happened, but was overwhelmed by Pandareus' slaves who captured and immobilised him.

He was tied up, his body smeared with honey and hurled into a sheepfold as flies flocked to him. Aëdon in pity and in memory of their old love, kept the flies off of him. Her parents and brother grew angry with her, seeing her actions as treachery, and attempted to kill her. Zeus intervened and transformed all the people involved into birds. Polytechnus became a pelekan bird because of the axe (pelekus) Hephaestus had once given him.

== The identity of the bird ==
The bird mentioned in Antoninus Liberalis, the πελεκάν, is the ancient Greek word for pelican, along with πελεκῖνος, but this is not the only bird that can be identified with the one Polytechnus turned into. Francis Celoria says that the bird of the Greek text is the πελεκᾶς, a type of woodpecker, and Forbes Irving also describes Polytechnus' new avian form as a land bird (which the pelican is not) as opposed to his in-laws who became water birds.

== See also ==
- Alcyone and Ceyx
- Child cannibalism
- Demophon of Elaeus
- Haemus and Rhodope
- Thyestes

== Bibliography ==
- Antoninus Liberalis, The Metamorphoses of Antoninus Liberalis translated by Francis Celoria (Routledge 1992). Online version at the Topos Text Project.
- Bell, Robert E. (1991). Women of Classical Mythology: A Biographical Dictionary. ABC-Clio. ISBN 9780874365818.}
- Celoria, Francis (1992). The Metamorphoses of Antoninus Liberalis: A Translation with a Commentary. Routledge. ISBN 0-415-06896-7.
- Forbes Irving, Paul M. C. (1990). Metamorphosis in Greek Myths. Clarendon Press. ISBN 0-19-814730-9.
- Hünemörder, Christian (October 1, 2006). "Pelican". In Cancik, Hubert; Schneider, Helmuth (eds.). Brill's New Pauly. Translated by Christine F. Salazar. Hamburg: Brill Reference Online. ISSN 1574-9347.
- Liddell, Henry George; Scott, Robert (1940). A Greek-English Lexicon, revised and augmented throughout by Sir Henry Stuart Jones with the assistance of Roderick McKenzie. Oxford: Clarendon Press. Online version at Perseus.tufts project.
