= Joseph Fontenrose =

American historian of ancient Greece (1903–1986)

Photo of Joseph Fontenrose

Joseph Eddy Fontenrose (17 June 1903 in Sutter Creek – July 1986 in Ashland, Oregon) was an American classical scholar. He was centrally interested in Greek religion and Greek mythology; he was also an expert on John Steinbeck, commenting on the mythology in Steinbeck's work.

Fontenrose was born and raised in Sutter Creek, California. He graduated in 1925 in Political Science at University of California, Berkeley, where he spent most of his academic career after an instructor position he held from 1937. An early influence was Ivan Linforth. He was made a professor in 1955, chaired the classics department, and became professor emeritus.

His politics were known to be socialist. He gave public support in the early 1960s to the Free Speech Movement and Young People's Socialist League. He showed a more conservative side in relation to student activism as it touched teaching.

In his 1966 book, The Ritual Theory of Myth, he subjected the myth-ritual theory to an intense attack, targeting the views of some of the associated scholars, particularly Lord Raglan and Stanley Edgar Hyman.

== Works ==
- Python; a study of Delphic myth and its origins (1959)
- John Steinbeck; an introduction and interpretation (1963)
- The Ritual Theory of Myth (1966)
- The Delphic Oracle: Its Responses and Operations (1978)
- Orion: The Myth of the Hunter and the Huntress (1981)
- Steinbeck's Unhappy Valley. A Study of The Pastures of Heaven (1981)
- Classics at Berkeley, The First Century (1869-1970) (1982)
- Didyma. Apollo's Oracle, Cult and Companions (1988)
