= Hückeswagen Castle =

- Near Hückeswagen, Oberbergischer Kreis, North Rhine-Westphalia, Germany
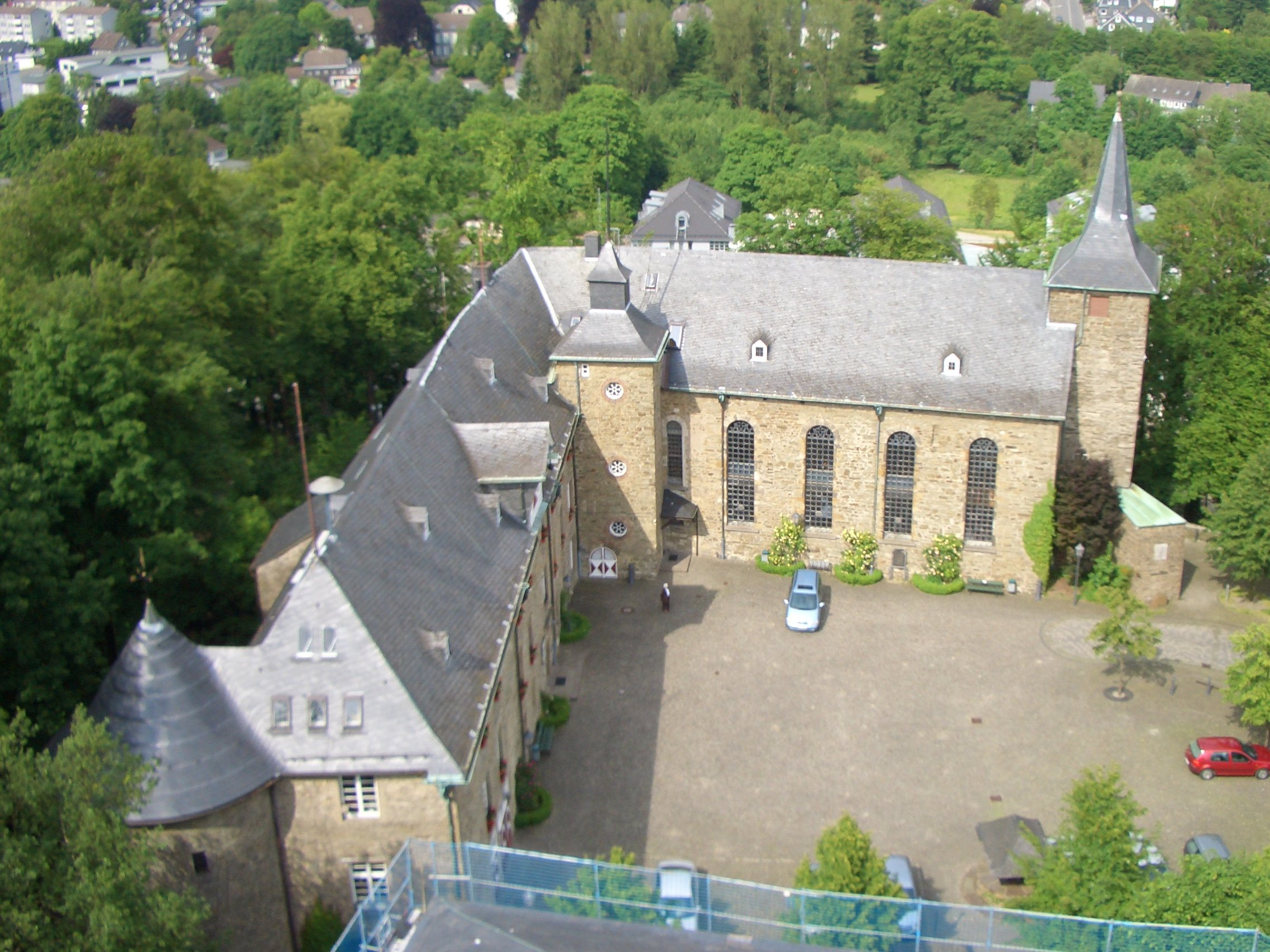
- Hückeswagen Castle

Site information
- Owner: City of Hückeswagen, Museum
- Controlled by: City of Hückeswagen
- Open to the public: Yes
- Condition: All parts receive

Location
- Coordinates: 51.1512°N 7.3411°E
- Height: 308 m

Site history
- Built: before 1198
- Built by: Count of Hückeswagen
- In use: Until
- Materials: Quarrystone

Hückeswagen Castle is the castle of the town of Hückeswagen in the Oberbergische Kreis, North Rhine-Westphalia, Germany.

It is first recorded in the year 1189. Today (2005) it accommodates municipal offices and a museum of local history.

== History ==
The castle Hückeswagen (castrum Hukingiswage) was mentioned for the first time in 1189, the counts by Hückeswagen, however, already in 1138. In 1260 the county Hückeswagen was disposed to the counts Berg, and the Hückeswagener counts moved to Moravia. In the future the castle of the countess Margarete von Hochstaden served as a widow's seat. To constant Verpfändungen of Hückeswagen during the following centuries the name changed in 1397 into castle. During the following centuries the castle was mostly in a bad state, until it reached in 1884 at first partially in the possession of the town. Later the city administration and the home museum were accommodated there. Only in 2005 parts of the city administration were evacuated in the civil centre built in the former central station area on the Etapler place

== Scoundrel's tower ==
One of the most striking components of the arrangement is the donjon which is also called "scoundrel's tower". He was probably established in the first third of the 13th century. The oldest view of the castle of Erich Philipp Ploennies at the beginning of the 18th century shows the tower with 23 metres substantially higher than today. The reduction on two floors occurred at rebuilding and protection work at the beginning of the 19th century.

== Surroundings of the castle ==
The castle square is fastened and by vehicles over Marktstrasse which leads immediately by the historical Old Town to reach. A historical well which was redeveloped in 2007 extensively stands on the place enclosed with a wall. Also sidewalks start to the castle: once from Bahnhofstrasse by the so-called Schlosshagen (tree growth with sidewalks) or alternatively over the precipitous street "castle mountain" which branches off from Islandstrasse. The rose garden borders on the castle square oppositely. Striking building there is a historical pavilion. Directly beside the castle stands the Paulus church Hückeswagen. The Steengaden, a rest of the former connection arrangement, is below the castle in Islandstrasse.

== Pictures ==
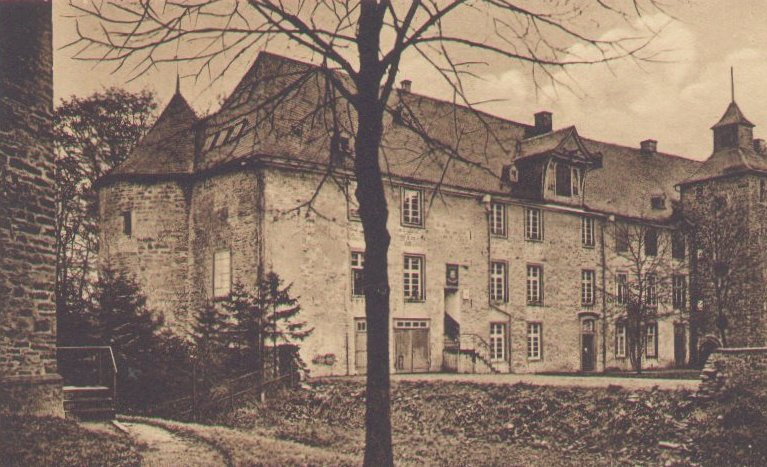
Hückeswagen Castle

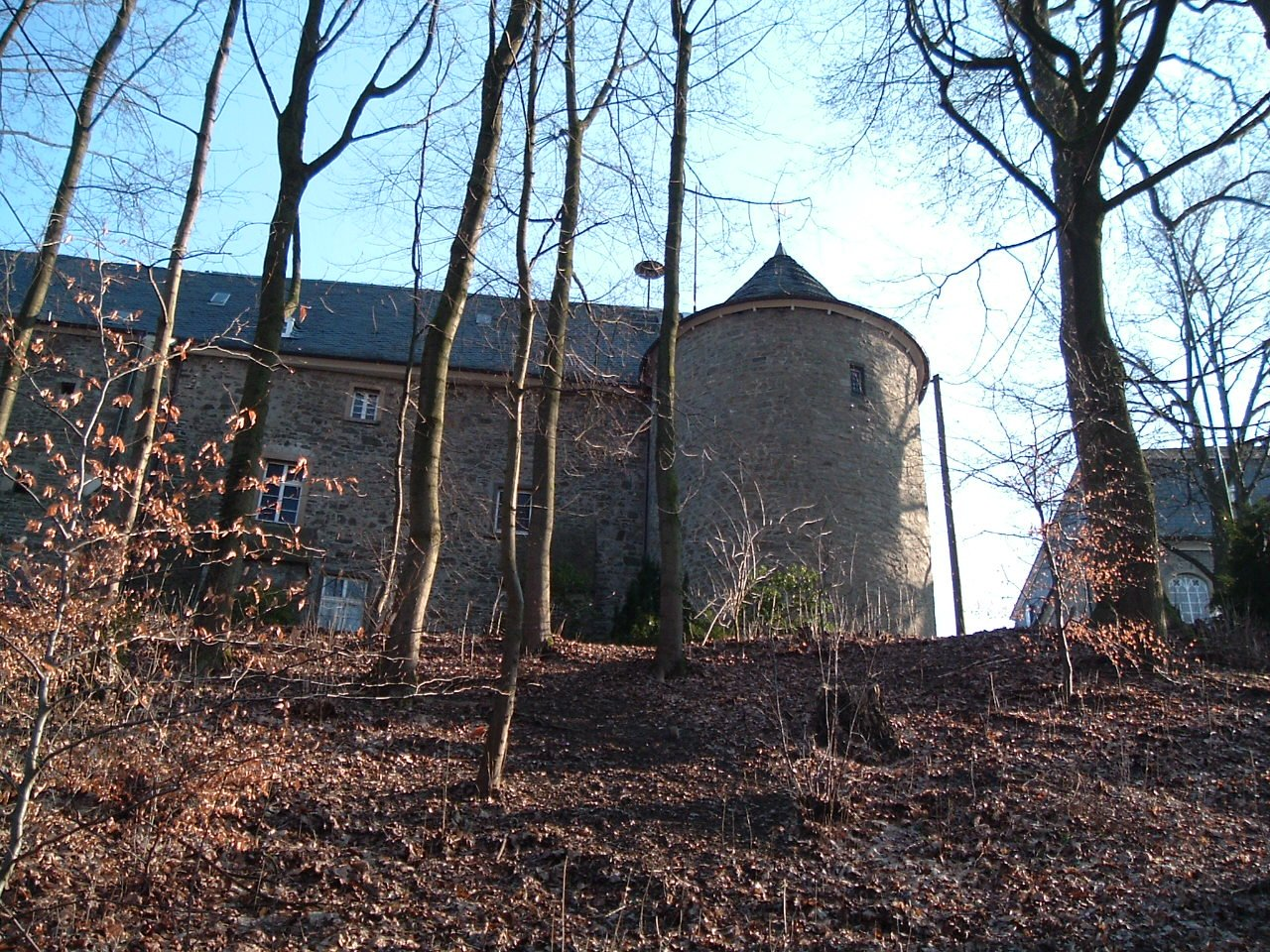
The Schelmentower
