= Hückeswagen =

- Town
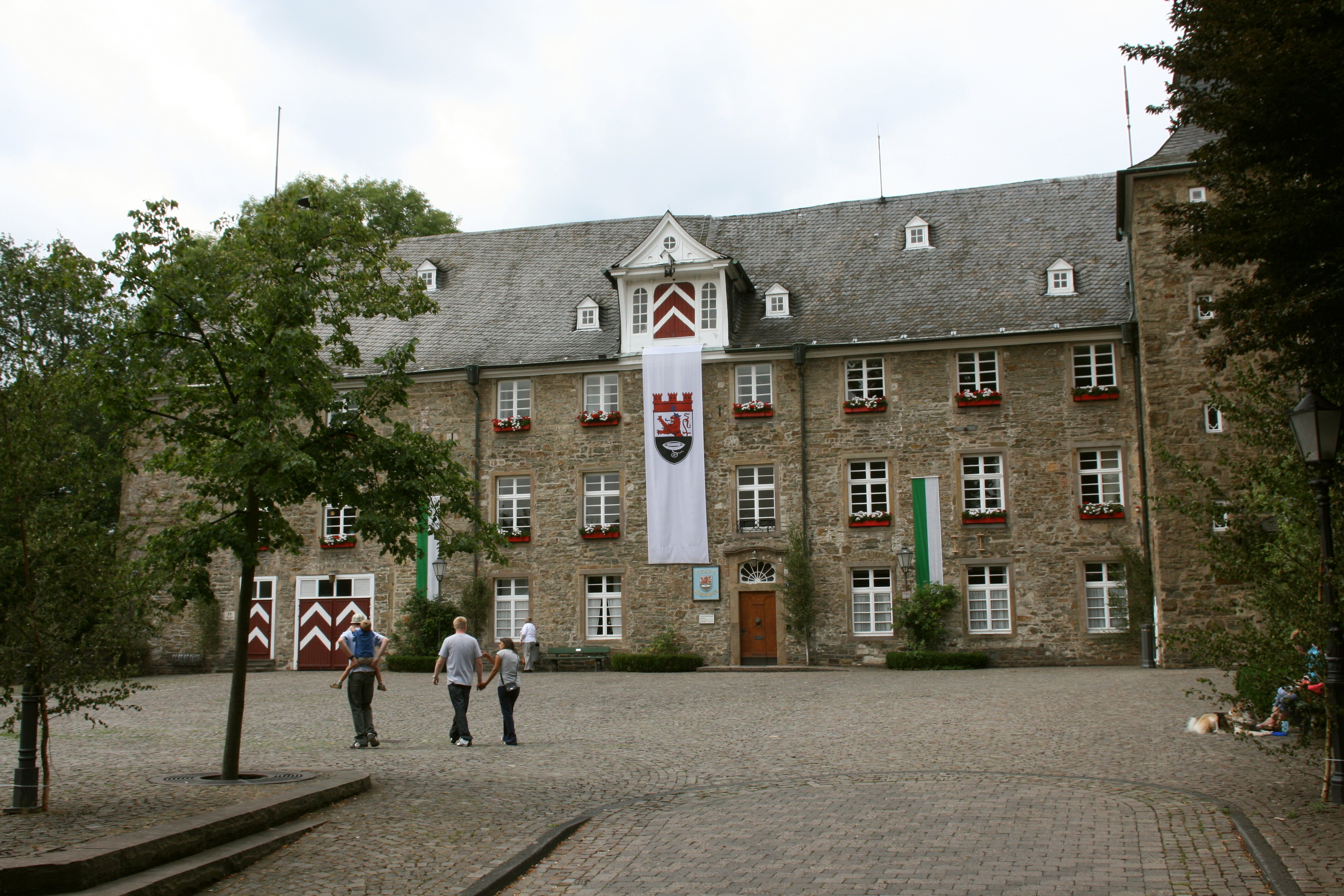
- City administration office in the Hückeswagen Palace

- Coat of arms

- Location of Hückeswagen within Oberbergischer Kreis district
- Interactive map of Hückeswagen
- Location within Germany Location within North Rhine-Westphalia
- Coordinates: 51°8′42″N 7°20′30″E
- Country: Germany
- State: North Rhine-Westphalia
- Admin. region: Köln
- District: Oberbergischer Kreis

Government
  - Mayor (2020–25): Dietmar Persian (Ind.)

Area
  - Total: 50.52 km^{2} (19.51 sq mi)
- Elevation: 308 m (1,010 ft)

Population (2025-12-31)
  - Total: 14,416
  - Density: 285.4/km^{2} (739.1/sq mi)
- Time zone: UTC+01:00 (CET)
  - Summer (DST): UTC+02:00 (CEST)
- Postal codes: 42499
- Dialling codes: 02192
- Vehicle registration: GM
- Website: www.hueckeswagen.de

Hückeswagen (German pronunciation: [ˈhʏkəsˌvaːɡn̩]) is a town in the north of Oberbergischen Kreis, in North Rhine-Westphalia, Germany. It is part of the governmental district of Cologne.

== Geography ==
Hückeswagen is situated on the river Wupper. Two dams, Bevertal dam and Wuppertal dam, are near the city. Hückeswagen's location in the narrow valley and well as the castle mountain are notable. It is located approximately 40 km away from Cologne. Nearby towns are Radevormwald, Wipperfürth, Wermelskirchen and Remscheid.

== The coat of arms of Hückeswagen ==
The arms were granted on August 9, 1892. The arms show in the upper part the lion from the arms of the Counts of Berg, who bought the area in 1260 from the Counts of Hückeswagen. The lower part is a symbol for the textile industry, which has been important to the town since the late Middle Ages. The combination of lion and spindle appears first in a seal from 1555.

== History ==
Hückeswagen was an ancestral seat of the counts of Hückeswagen and in 1085 became for the first time a Franconian Salhof, or saddle court, in form of a "confirmation of a donation of the genotypes of the Essen abbess Svanhild among other things by emperors Heinrich IV. (HRR)" mentions documentary. (Documentary first namings oberbergische places v. Klaus Pampus).

Between 1220 and 1240 the counts of Hückeswagen moved to Bohemia and built the "Hukvaldy" and "Alttitschein" castles.

Between 1490 and 1508 the "Nikolaus church" was built. Later the "Paulus church" was established after a fire.

Town privileges were given to Hückeswagen on 4 April 1859 according to Rhenish town order. From 1861 to 1920 Hückeswagen consisted of the municipality and Neuhückeswagen, a juridically rural community. On 1 March 1920 the juridically independent municipalities were combined. On 18 October 1875 the still young city was connected to the railroad network. During the period of industrialisation Hückeswagen had a significant textile industry. Cloth available in Hückeswagen today testifies to the great prosperity of the industrial families. The importance of the town as the center of the local area has been reduced in last few decades as the neighbouring town Wipperfürth received some municipal and public facilities to establish itself as an important center. Because of municipal reform, in 1975 the town lost the share of Bergisch Born in Remscheid.

On July 12, 1969 Joachim Kroll murdered Maria Hettgen, 61, near here.

== Population ==
Historical population

Year	Pop.	±% p.a.
1965	13,125	—
1970	13,688	+0.84%
1975	13,996	+0.45%
1980	14,578	+0.82%
1985	14,505	−0.10%
1990	15,601	+1.47%
1995	16,016	+0.53%

Year	Pop.	±% p.a.
2000	16,397	+0.47%
2005	16,435	+0.05%
2010	15,643	−0.98%
2015	15,275	−0.47%
2020	14,810	−0.62%
2025	14,416	−0.54%

Source: Landesdatabank Nordrhein-Westfalen

== Origin of the name ==
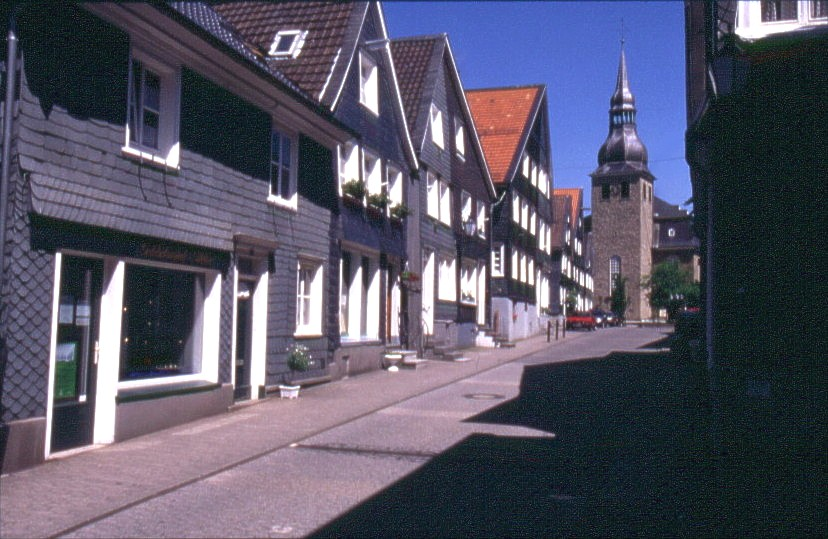
Market street in Hückeswagen

The name derives from the earlier form "Hukensuuage" or "Huckengeswage", signifying the settlement of a man named Hugobert or Hugibald. Local history researcher Wilhelm Blankertz presents a different theory in his publications, that the oldest local name was "Hukengesuuage", meaning "settlement of the Hunginger family near the water". The settlement was mentioned for the first time in 1085 in a deed issued by the abbess Svanhild of Essen to a nobleman. Around 1298 the form "Huckenshove" came into use.

== Places of interest ==
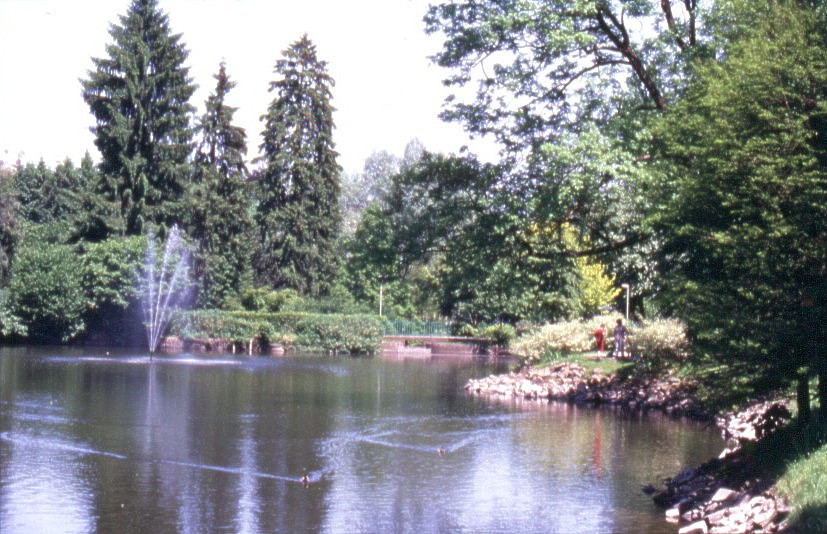
Swan pond at castle Hueckeswagen

- The historic city center
- Hückeswagen Castle and the local history museum
- Catholic parish church – Sankt Mariä Himmelfahrt
- Paulus church – Protestant
- Johannis church – Protestant
- Swan pond in the town park
- The Bever dam and the Wuppertal dam offer recreational opportunities with their vast traveling and water sport possibilities.
- Hückeswagner mills

== Local area ==
- Altenhof
- Altenholte
- Aue
- Berbeck
- Bergerhof
- Bochen
- Bockhacken
- Böckel
- Braßhagen
- Buchholz
- Busche
- Busenbach
- Busenberg
- Dierl
- Dörpe
- Dörpersteeg
- Dörpfeld
- Dörpfelderhöhe
- Dreibäumen
- Dürhagen
- Eckenhausen
- Elberhausen
- Engelshagen
- Erlensterz
- Fockenhausen
- Frohnhausen
- Fürweg
- Fuhr
- Funkenhausen
- Goldenbergshammer
- Großberghausen
- Großeichen
- Großenscheidt
- Großkatern
- Grünenthal – Grünestraße
- Hagelsiepen
- Hambüchen
- Hammerstein
- Hangberg
- Hartkopsbever
- Heide
- Heidt
- Heinhausen
- Herweg
- Hummeltenberg
- Junkernbusch
- Junkerndorf
- Käfernberg
- Kaisersbusch
- Kammerforsterhöhe
- Karquelle
- Karrenstein
- Kautzenberg
- Kirschsiepen
- Kleinberghausen
- Kleineichen
- Kleinenscheidt
- Kleinhöhfeld
- Kleinkatern
- Knefelsberg
- Kobeshofen
- Kormannshausen
- Kotthausen
- Kurzfeld
- Linde
- Maisdörpe
- Marke
- Mickenhagen
- Mitberg
- Mittelbeck
- Mittelhombrechen
- Mühlenberg
- Niederbeck
- Niederburghof
- Niederdahlhausen
- Niederdorp
- Niederhagelsiepen
- Neuenherweg
- Neuenholte
- Neuhückeswagen
- Neukretze
- Niederlangenberg
- Oberbeck
- Oberburghof
- Oberdorp
- Oberhombrechen
- Oberlangenberg
- Odenholl
- Odenholler Mühle
- Pixberg
- Pixberger Mühle
- Pixwaag
- Pleuse
- Posthäuschen
- Purd
- Rautzenberg
- Reinshagenbever
- Röttgen
- Scheideweg
- Scheuer
- Schmitzberg
- Schnabelsmühle
- Schneppenthal
- Schückhausen
- Siepersbever
- Sohl
- Stahlschmidtsbrücke
- Steffenshagen
- Steinberg
- Steinberg (Bevertalsperre)
- Stoote
- Straßweg
- Straßburg
- Strucksfeld
- Tannenbaum
- Ulemannssiepen
- Unterscheideweg
- Vogelsholl
- Vormwald
- Voßhagen
- Warth
- Wefelsen
- Wegerhof
- Westenbrücke
- Westhofen
- Westhoferhöhe
- Wickesberg
- Wiehagen
- Winterhagen
- Wüste
- Wüstung Hagermühle
- Zipshausen

== Economy ==
Enterprises

The biggest employer in the town is "Klingelnberg", a mechanical engineering company.

=== Trade surfaces ===
The city of Hückeswagen has approximately 600,000 square metres of industrial space. Of it the biggest coherent trades and industrial zones are in the city center area between the B 237 and the Wupper, in Kobeshofen, in Winterhagen/ Industriestreet and in the area in the Schlossfabrik /Kleineichen. A new industrial area with about 400,000 square metres commercial area is opened nowadays in cooperation with the town of Remscheid in the area between winter hedges and scabbard way on the western local border with immediate binding to the B 237.

== Traffic ==
=== Public transit ===
The section of the Remscheid line between Hückeswagen and Gummersbach was rarely used, the main Remscheid railway station was closed off, and the railroad was later closed completely. Today, only bus connections exist to Remscheid, Gummersbach, Radevormwald and Wermelskirchen. The town belongs to the transport group Rhine-Sieg.

=== Motor traffic ===
The federal highway 237 and the federal highway 483 pass by Hückeswagen. A town bypass is planned, for the improvement of the transport guidance, but the financing of this road has not been cleared. Later plans for a second by-pass road should provide for further easing of traffic congestion throughout the town.

==== Location leading system ====
In 2004, a location-leading system was introduced to Hückeswagen, consisting of a terminal in the entrance to the town, it makes it easier for foreign visitors to orient themselves around the town. Above all, it enables foreign truck drivers, and company customers, whom need to visit one of the industrial areas, to bypass the town itself.

== Personalities ==
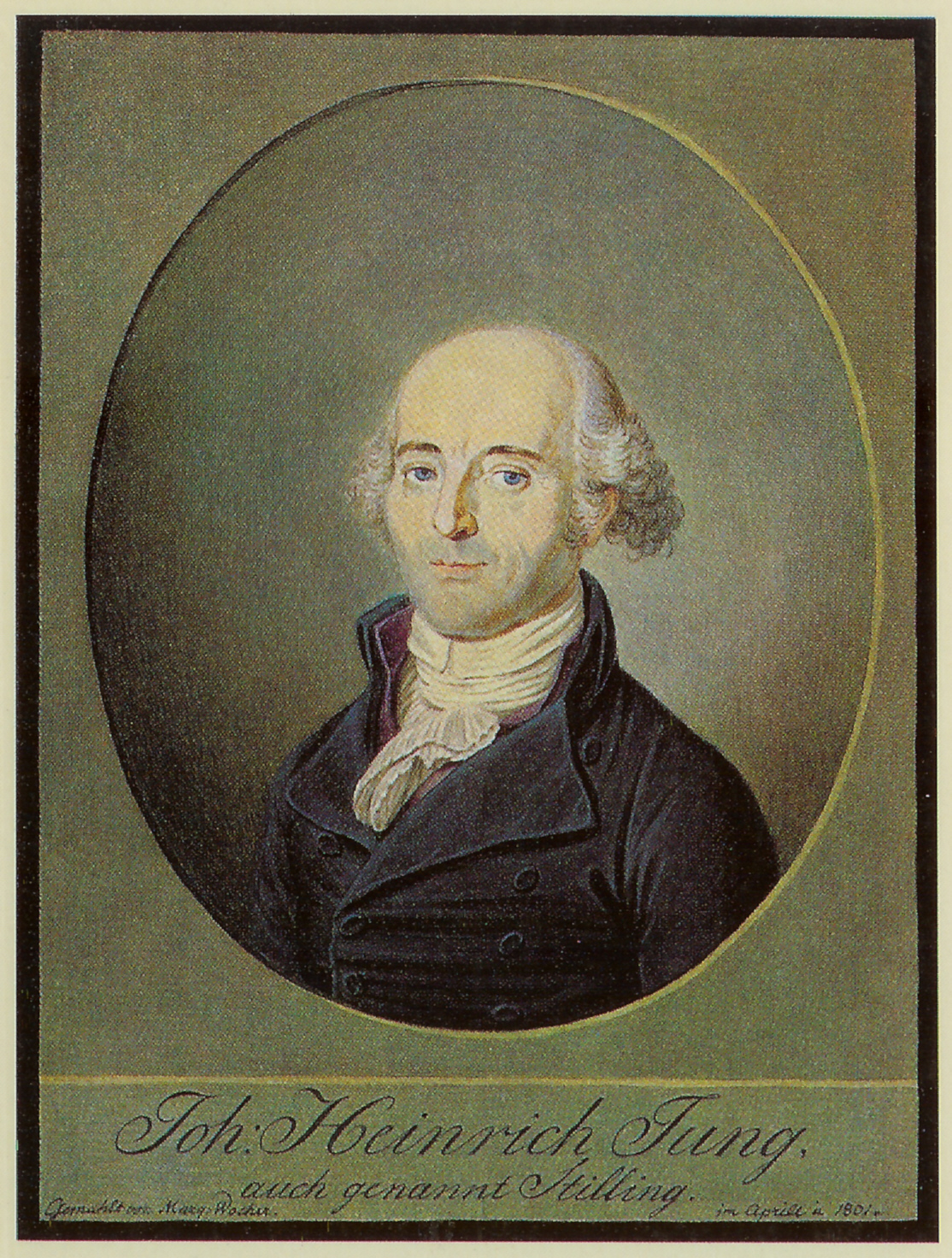
Johann Heinrich Jung in 1801

- Willi Daume (1913–1996) – former National Olympic Committee president
- Heidemarie Ecker-Rosendahl – 1972 Summer Olympics long jump winner
- Johann Heinrich Jung (1740–1817), author
- Vinzenz Jakob von Zuccalmaglio, named Montanus (in 1806–1876)
- Maria Zanders (née Johanny; born 1839)
- Peter Biesenbach – German politician, Landtag member
- Walter Ufer (born here 1876) – American artist based in Taos, New Mexico
- Jörg Guido Hülsmann – economist
- Julian Wasserfuhr – jazz trumpeter
- Roman Wasserfuhr – jazz pianist, composer and arranger

== International relations ==
Hückeswagen is twinned with:

- Étaples sur Mer (France), since 29 July 1972.
