= Abboud and Khajawa =

Iraqi serial killers and cannibals

- Abboud (left) and Khajawa (right)
- Born: 19th-century Ottoman Empire
- Died: 1917; Mosul, Ottoman Empire
- Cause of death: Execution by hanging
- Convictions: Murder; Cannibalism
- Penalty: Death

Details
- Victims: 100+
- Span of crimes: ?–1917
- Country: Ottoman Empire (present-day Iraq)
- State: Nineveh
- Date apprehended: 1917

Abboud al-Tabakh and Khajawa al-Dallah (Arabic: عبود وخجاوة; d. 1917) were Iraqi serial killers and cannibals. They were convicted of murdering and eating the remains of an elderly neighbour and dozens of children in Mosul in 1917, luring most of their victims with the help of their young son.

Considered some of the worst criminals in the country's history, the pair were sentenced to death and subsequently hanged for their crimes in 1917.

== Background ==
Little information is available about the lives of Abboud and Khajawa prior to their crimes, including when they were born, when they met and when they married. Some sources claim that the couple were Christians, with Abboud working as a cook while Khajawa worked as a tour guide.

In the mid-1910s, Mosul was struck by a devastating famine due to the combination of a local drought and inflation of the lira's price. As a result, the residents were left impoverished and resorted to violent crime and eating stray animals. Abboud and Khajawa were not exempted, with the couple reportedly catching and dismembering stray cats and dogs to feed off their meat.

== Murders ==
The couple committed their first known murder sometime in or before 1917, when they strangled to death an elderly female neighbour who had come to visit them. They then cannibalized her remains, but because her meat was too tough and contained too much fat, they spent the night vomiting. On the next day, Khajawa suggested that they target children exclusively, as she expected them to taste much better. Abboud immediately agreed, and the couple began devising ways to kidnap potential victims without being noticed.

Their modus operandi consisted of instructing their young son to lure other children from the street, ostensibly so they could play together. When the victim was isolated in their home, Abboud and Khajawa would bludgeon them with a rock. The couple then skinned, dismembered and cooked the child's remains, which they would subsequently eat. The skulls were thrown down a well that they had in their backyard.

The couple did this on a consistent basis for an estimated several months, murdering dozens of children, sometimes several from the same family. Due to the ongoing famine, their disappearances were not noticed by the public at large and were ignored by the authorities, allowing the couple to get away with it for a considerable period. They also opened a small restaurant where they sold some of the meat, presenting it as venison or qaliya (mutton with spices).

== Arrest and confession ==
Sometime in 1917, a customer who had purchased some qaliya from the couple noticed that he was chewing on a solid bone. Being a butcher by profession, he recognized that it was part of a small child's finger and immediately reported it to the authorities. An inspection of their home led to the discovery of the well, which had been packed with approximately a hundred skulls from children. The spouses were taken to the police station, where Khajawa broke down and confessed all their crimes.

== Trial and execution ==
After a short trial, Abboud and Khajawa were convicted and sentenced to death. On the morning of their execution, the couple rode two donkeys to Bab Al-Tob Square, where makeshift gallows had been erected. On the way, many bystanders cursed, spit at and assaulted the couple, with one report claiming that a woman whose three children had been killed by them bit off one of Khajawa's toes. Khajawa was reportedly distressed and apologized profusely, while Abboud remained remorseless and cursed at the crowd, telling them that the government's poor handling of the famine had caused them to turn to cannibalism.

Shortly afterwards, both of them were publicly hanged in front of a large crowd of spectators.

== See also ==
- Child cannibalism
- List of incidents of cannibalism
- List of serial killers by country
