= Joachim Kroll =

German serial killer and cannibal

- Born: 17 April 1933; Hindenburg, Germany
- Died: 1 July 1991 (aged 58); Rheinbach, Germany
- Other names: "Ruhr Cannibal"; "Duisburg Man-Eater"
- Occupation: Lavatory attendant
- Convictions: Murder, attempted murder
- Penalty: Life imprisonment (8 counts)

Details
- Victims: 8+ (14 confessed)
- Date: 8 February 1955 – 3 July 1976
- Country: West Germany
- Location: Ruhr metropolitan region

Joachim Georg Kroll (17 April 1933 – 1 July 1991) was a German serial killer, child molester, necrophile and cannibal who murdered a minimum of eight women and young girls in the Ruhr metropolitan region from 1955 until his arrest on 3 July 1976. He was convicted of eight murders and one attempted murder but confessed to a total of 14. He was sentenced to life imprisonment on 8 April 1982.

== Early life ==
Born on 17 April 1933 as the son of a miner in Hindenburg (Zabrze), Upper Silesia, Kroll was the sixth of nine children. After the end of World War II, during which his father was a prisoner of war, Kroll's family moved to North Rhine-Westphalia.

== Crimes ==
He began killing in 1955 after his mother died. Around 1960, Kroll went to Duisburg and found work as a toilet attendant for Mannesmann. Afterwards, he worked for Thyssen Industries and moved to Friesenstrasse 24, Laar, a district of Duisburg. At that time he resumed killing people.

=== List of victims ===
- 8 February 1955 – Irmgard Strehl, 19, raped and stabbed to death. Her disembowelled body was found in a barn in Lüdinghausen.
- 3 March 1956 – Erika Schuletter, 12, raped and strangled in Kirchhellen which is now part of Bottrop.
- 16 June 1959 – Klara Frieda Tesmer, 24, murdered in the meadows of the Rhine, near Rheinhausen. A mechanic, Heinrich Ott, was arrested for the crime. He hanged himself in prison.
- 26 July 1959 – Manuela Knodt, 16, raped and strangled in the City Park of Essen. Slices of flesh were carved from her buttocks and thighs.
- 23 April 1962 – Petra Giese, 13, raped and strangled in Dinslaken-Bruckhausen. Vinzenz Kuehn was arrested and convicted.
- 4 June 1962 – Monika Tafel, 12, killed in Walsum, slices of flesh carved from her buttocks. Walter Quicker was arrested for the crime. He was later released but was driven by neighbours to suicide in October.
- 3 September 1962 – Barbara Bruder, 12, abducted in Burscheid. Her body was never found.
- 22 August 1965 – Hermann Schmitz, 25, and his girlfriend Marion Veen were attacked as they sat in a car in a lover's lane in Duisburg-Großenbaum. Hermann—Kroll's only male victim—was killed, but Veen escaped.
- 13 September 1966 – Ursula Rohling, 20, strangled in Foersterbusch Park near Marl. Her boyfriend Adolf Schickel committed suicide after being falsely accused of the crime.
- 22 December 1966 – Ilona Harke, aged 5, raped and drowned in a ditch in Wuppertal.
- 12 July 1969 – Maria Hettgen, 61, raped and strangled at Hückeswagen.
- 21 May 1970 – Jutta Rahn, 13, strangled while walking home from a train station. Peter Schay was arrested and eventually released. He confessed to the crime in 1976 after being hounded by his neighbours.
- 8 May 1976 – Karin Toepfer, 10, raped and strangled in Voerde.
- 3 July 1976 – Marion Ketter, 4. Parts of her body were in the process of being simmered when Kroll was arrested.

=== Method ===
Kroll was very particular about where he killed, only killing in the same place on a few occasions years apart. This, and the fact that there were a number of other killers operating in the area at the time, helped him to evade capture. Kroll would surprise his victims and strangle them quickly. Afterwards, he would strip the body and have intercourse with it, often masturbating over it again. He would then mutilate and cut off pieces to be eaten later. Upon returning home, he would have intercourse again with a rubber sex doll he had for this purpose.

=== Arrest ===
On 3 July 1976, Kroll was arrested for kidnapping and killing a four-year-old girl named Marion Ketter. As police went from home to home, a neighbour approached a policeman and told him that the waste pipe in his apartment building had been blocked up, and when he had asked his neighbour, Kroll, whether he knew what had been blocking the pipe, Kroll had simply replied, "guts". Upon this report, the police went up to Kroll's apartment and found the body of Marion Ketter cut up: some parts were in the refrigerator, a small hand was cooking in a pan of boiling water and the entrails were found stuck in the waste pipe. Kroll was immediately arrested.

=== Trial and death ===
He admitted killing Marion Ketter and gave details of 13 other murders and one attempted murder over the previous two decades.

Kroll said that he often sliced portions of flesh from his victims to cook and eat them, claiming that he did this to save on his grocery bills. In custody, he believed that he was going to get a simple operation to cure him of his homicidal urges and would then be released from prison. Instead, he was charged with eight murders and one attempted murder. In April 1982, after a 151-day trial, he was convicted on all counts and was given a life sentence.

He died of a heart attack in 1991 in the prison of Rheinbach.

== See also ==
- List of German serial killers
- List of incidents of cannibalism

== Books ==
- Stephan Harbort, "Ich musste sie kaputtmachen". Anatomie eines Jahrhundertmörders; Düsseldorf (Droste) 2004 (ISBN 3-7700-1174-0)
- Dunning, John (1992). "Little Girl Stew". Strange Deaths. City: Mulberry Editions. ISBN 1-873123-13-2.
