= Amphion and Zethus =

Greek mythological figures; considered the founders of Thebes

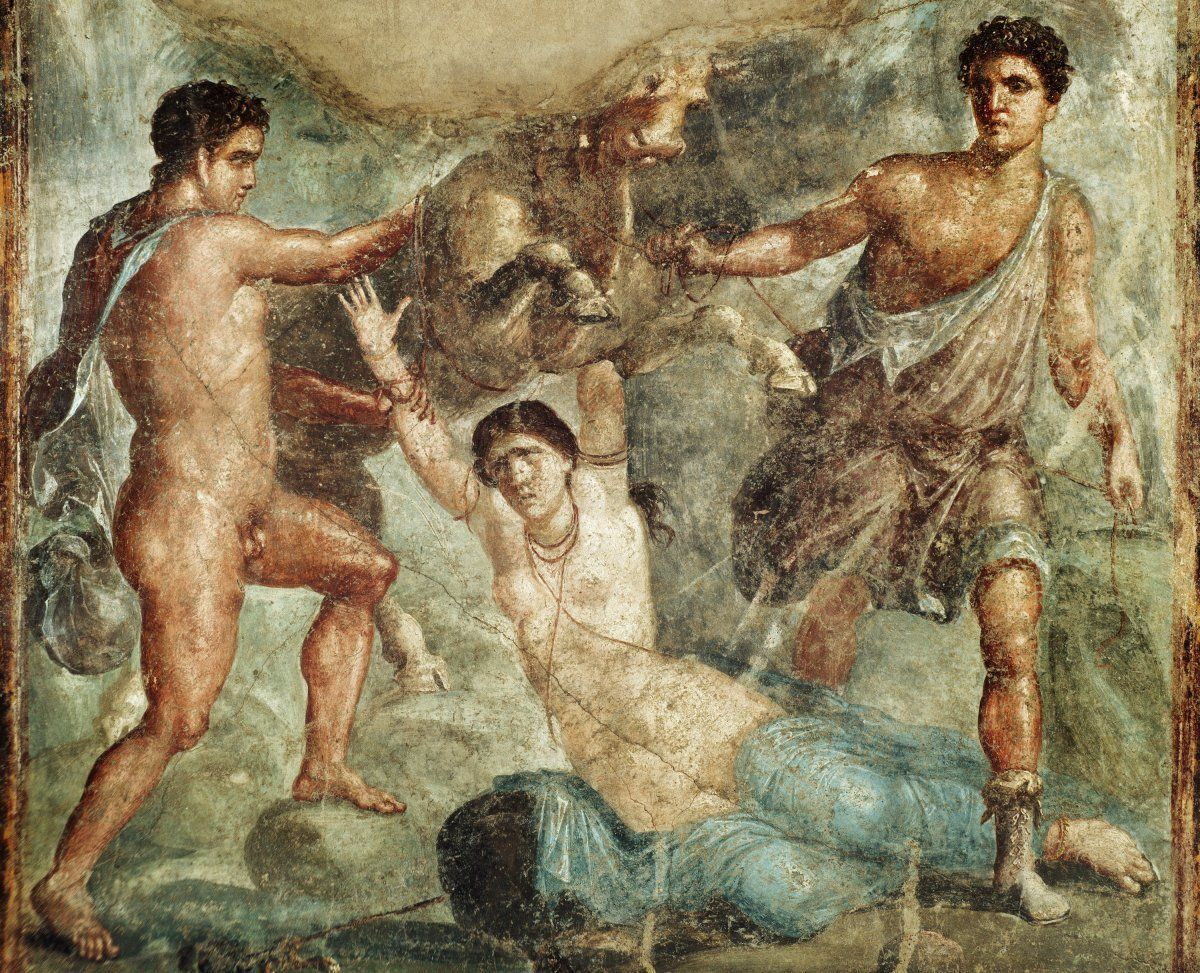
Dirce's punishment by Amphion and Zethus - Roman wall painting in House of the Vettii, Pompeii.

Amphion (/æmˈfaɪ.ɒn/; Ancient Greek: Ἀμφίων, romanized: Amphíōn) and Zethus (/ˈziːθəs/; Ancient Greek: Ζῆθος, romanized: Zêthos) were, in ancient Greek mythology, the twin sons of Zeus (or Theobus (Note: According to other writers and to Antiochus as cited in John Tzetzes. Chiliades, 1.13 line 319)) by Antiope. They are important characters in one of the two founding myths of the city of Thebes, because they constructed the city's walls. Zethus or Amphion had a daughter called Neis (Νηίς), and the Neitian gate at Thebes was believed to have derived its name from her.

== Mythology ==
=== Childhood ===
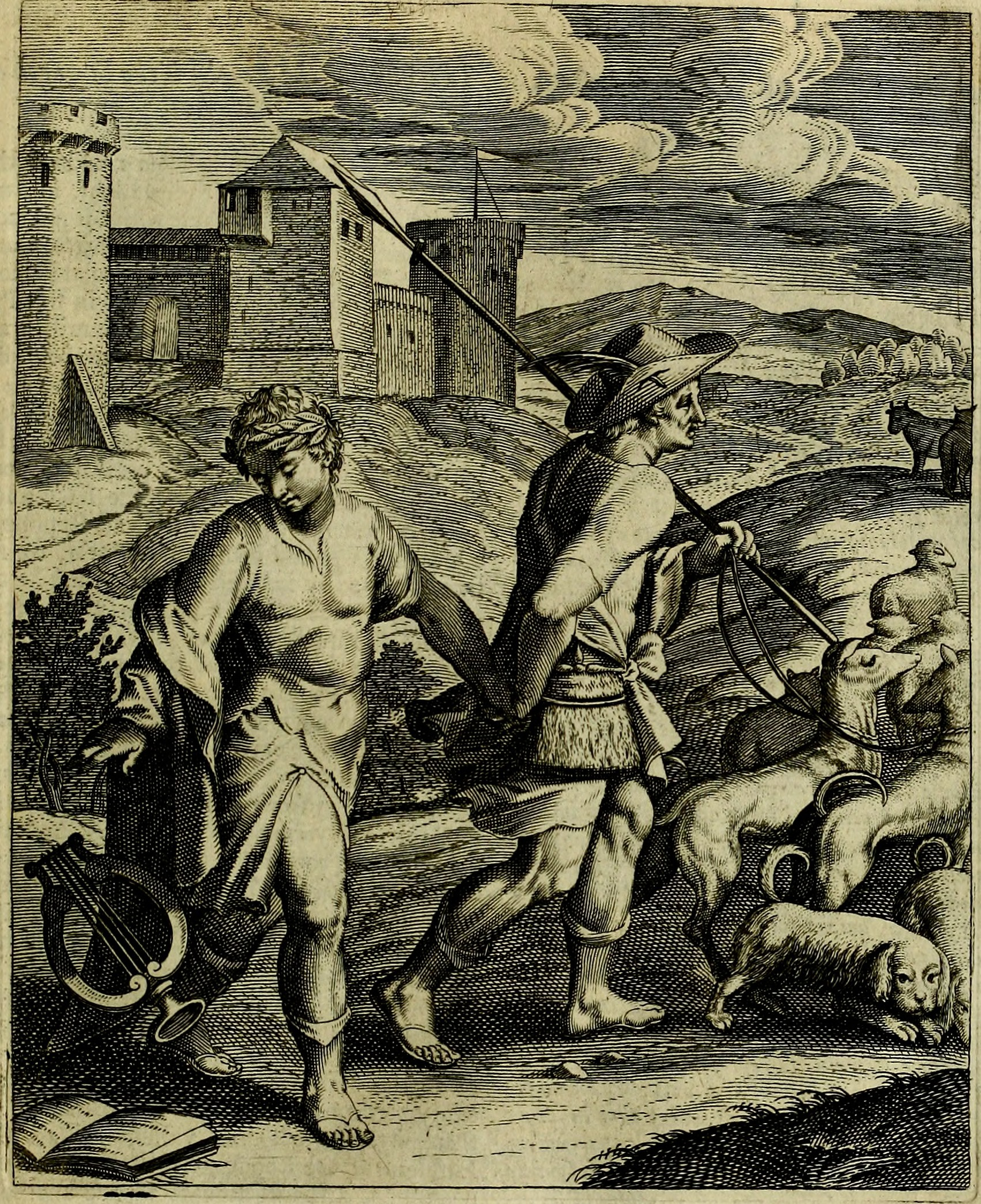
Amphion and Zethus

Amphion and Zethus were the sons of Antiope, who fled in shame to Sicyon after Zeus raped her, and married King Epopeus there. However, either Nycteus or Lycus attacked Sicyon in order to carry her back to Thebes and punish her. On the way back, she gave birth to the twins and was forced to expose them on Mount Cithaeron. Lycus gave her to his wife, Dirce, who treated her very cruelly for many years.

Antiope eventually escaped and found her sons living near Mount Cithaeron. After they were convinced that she was their mother, they killed Dirce by tying her to the horns of a bull, gathered an army, and conquered Thebes, becoming its joint rulers. They also either killed Lycus or forced him to give up his throne.

=== Rule of Thebes ===
Amphion became a great singer and musician after his lover Hermes taught him to play and gave him a golden lyre. Zethus became a hunter and herdsman, with a great interest in cattle breeding. As Zethus was associated with agriculture and the hunt, his attribute was the hunting dog, while Amphion's - the lyre. Amphion and Zethus built the fortifications of Thebes. They built the walls around the Cadmea, the citadel of Thebes, at the command of Apollo. While Zethus struggled to carry his stones, Amphion played his lyre and his stones followed after him and gently glided into place.

Amphion married Niobe, the daughter of Tantalus, the Lydian king. Because of this, he learned to play his lyre in the Lydian mode and added three strings to it. Zethus married Thebe, after whom the city of Thebes was named. Otherwise, the kingdom was named in honour of their supposed father Theobus.

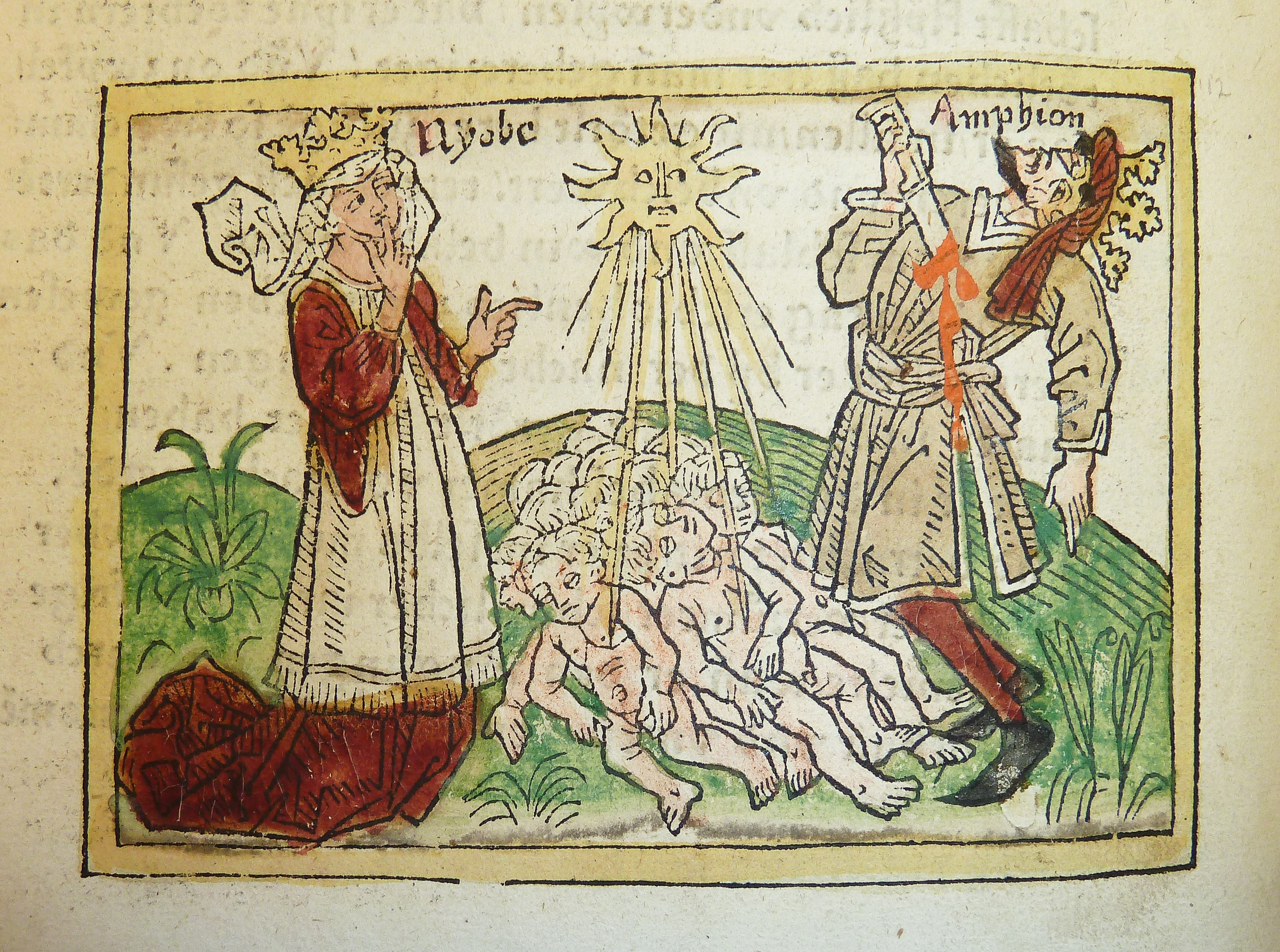
Woodcut illustration of Niobe, Amphion and their dead sons, printed by Johannes Zainer (ca. 1474)

=== Later misfortunes ===
Amphion's wife Niobe had many children, but had become arrogant and because of this she insulted the goddess Leto, who had only two children, Artemis and Apollo. Leto's children killed Niobe's children in retaliation (see Niobe). Niobe's overweening pride in her children, offending Apollo and Artemis, brought about her children's deaths. In Ovid, Amphion commits suicide out of grief; according to Telesilla, Artemis and Apollo murder him along with his children. Hyginus, however, writes that in his madness he tried to attack the temple of Apollo, and was killed by the god's arrows.

Zethus had only one son, who died through a mistake of his mother Thebe, causing Zethus to kill himself. In the Odyssey, however, Zethus's wife is called Aëdon, a daughter of Pandareus in book 19, who killed her son Itylus in a fit of madness and became a nightingale. Later authors would clarify that Aëdon tried to kill Niobe and Amphion's firstborn Amaleus out of jealousy that Niobe had borne many children, while she and Zethus only had one (though in some versions they also have a daughter Neis). However, in the dark of the night, Aëdon by mistake killed Itylus, and in her mourning she was transformed into a nightingale by her father-in-law Zeus when Zethus began to chase her down in rage for murdering their son. Alternatively, Aëdon was afraid that her husband (here, mistakenly perhaps, spelled Zetes) was having an affair with a nymph, and that Itylus was assisting his father in his infidelity, so she killed him.

After the deaths of Amphion and Zethus, Laius returned to Thebes and became king.

Elements of the brothers' mythology are comparable to myths of the twins Castor and Polydeuces (the Dioscuri), and of Romulus and Remus as founders of Rome.

== Family tree ==
Royal House of Thebes
- Solid lines indicate descendants.
- Dashed lines indicate marriages.
- Dotted lines indicate extra-marital relationships or adoptions.
- Kings of Thebes are numbered with bold names and a light purple background.
  - Joint rules are indicated by a number and lowercase letter, for example, 5a. Amphion shared the throne with 5b. Zethus.
- Regents of Thebes are alphanumbered (format AN) with bold names and a light red background.
  - The number N refers to the regency preceding the reign of the N^{th} king. Generally this means the regent served the N^{th} king but not always, as Creon (A9) was serving as regent to Laodamas (the 10th King) when he was slain by Lycus II (the usurping 9th king).
  - The letter A refers to the regency sequence. "A" is the first regent, "B" is the second, etc.
- Deities have a yellow background color.

Harmonia	1. Cadmus	Polyxo	A4. Nycteus (Regent)	Dirce	B4 & A6. Lycus (Regent)
Zeus	Zeus
Ino	Agave	Echion	3. Polydorus	Nycteis	Antiope
Semele	Autonoë
Dionysus	2. Pentheus	Epeiros	4. Labdacus	5a. Amphion	5b. Zethus
Oclasus
Menoeceus
Eurydice	A7, A8 & A9. Creon (Regent)	Jocasta	6. Laius	Merope	Polybus
Hipponome	Alcaeus
Zeus
Alcmene	Amphitryon	Perimede	7. Oedipus
Megara	Heracles	Iphicles	Anaxo
Henioche	Megareus	Haemon	Antigone	8b. Eteocles	Argea	8a. Polynices
Pyrrha	Lycomedes	Ismene	9. Lycus II
A12. Peneleos (Regent)	10. Laodamas	Demonassa	11. Thersander
Opheltes	12. Tisamenus
14. Damasichthon	13. Autesion
15. Ptolemy	Theras	Argeia	Aristodemus
16. Xanthos	Eurysthenes	Procles

== Gallery ==
=== Amphion ===
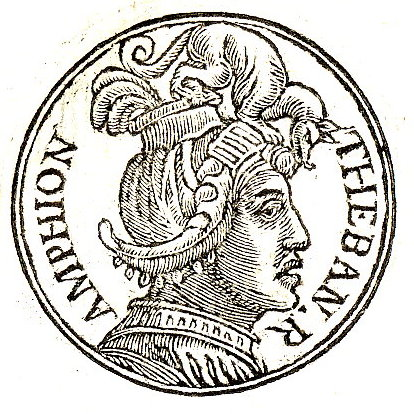
Amphion, son of Zeus and Antiope, and twin brother of Zethus

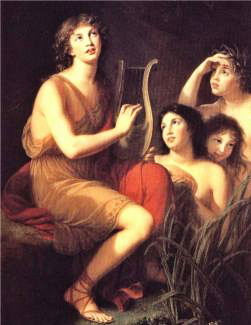
Amphion by NathanJacquin (November 16, 2015)

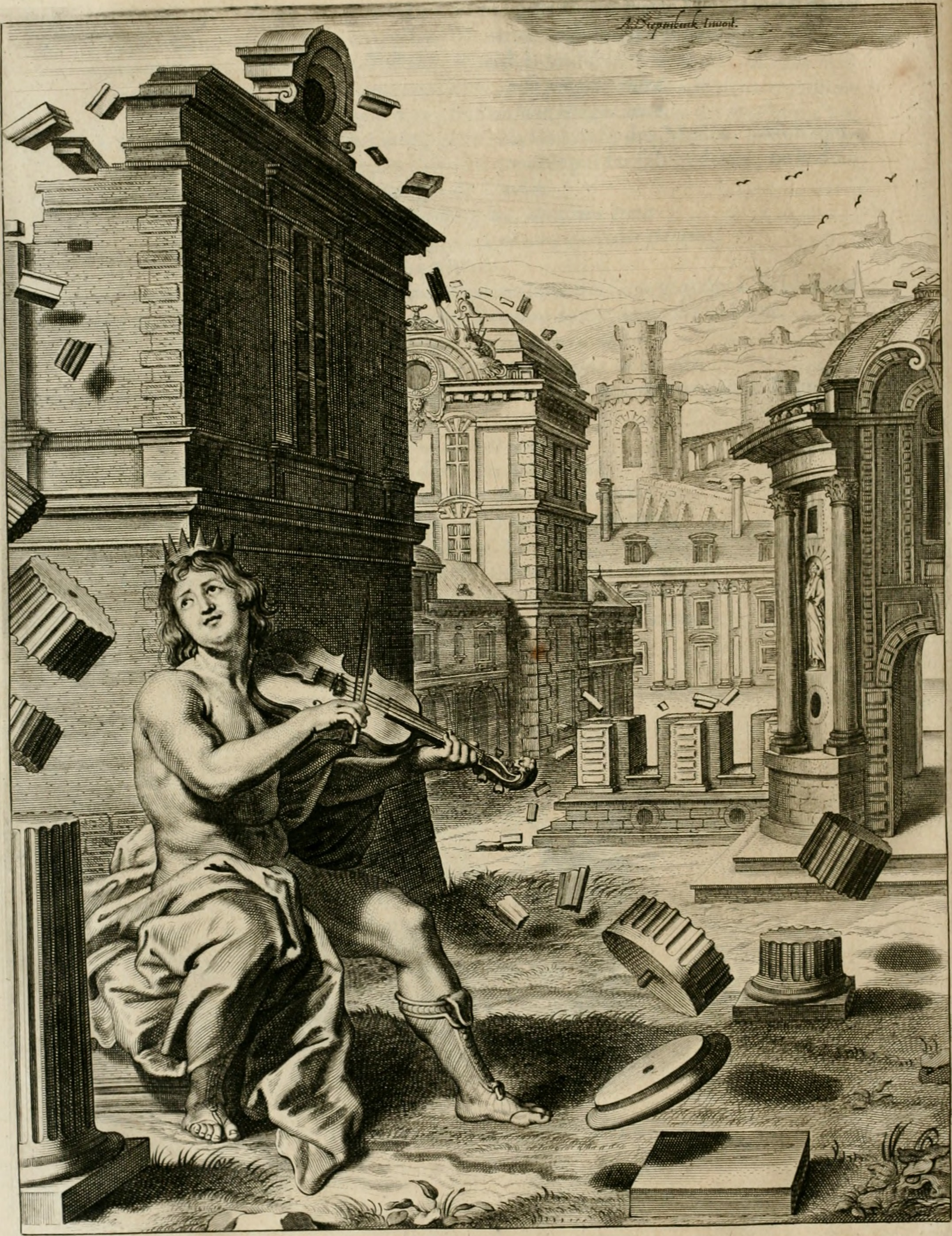
Amphion

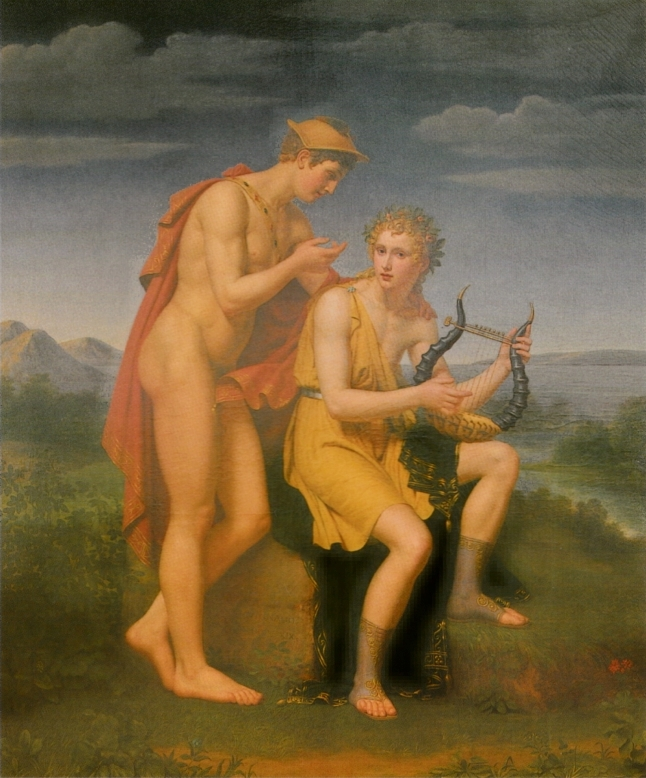
Mercury and Amphion by Jean Vignaud (1819)

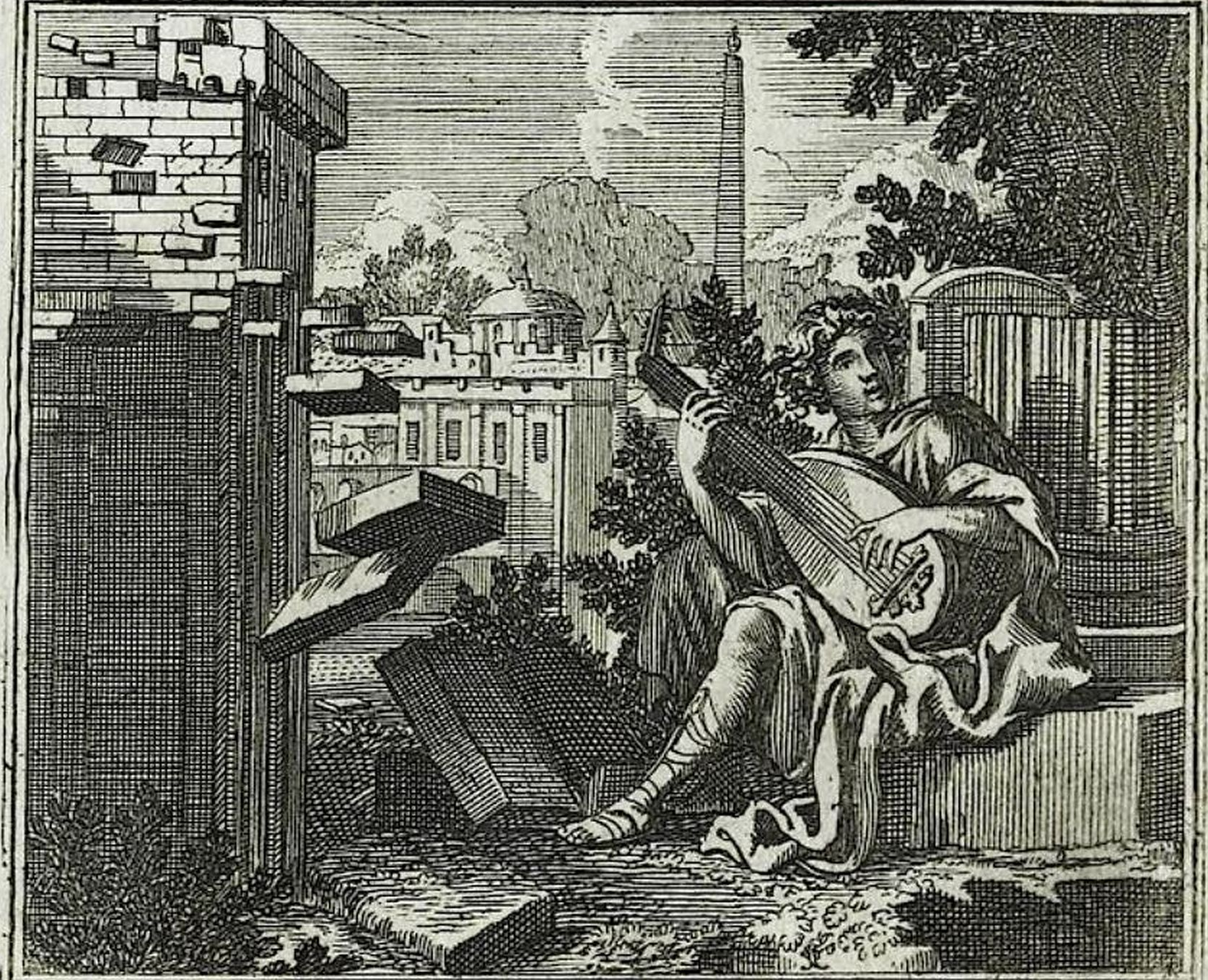
Amphion by Krauss, Johann Ulrich (ca. 1690)

=== Amphion and Zethus ===
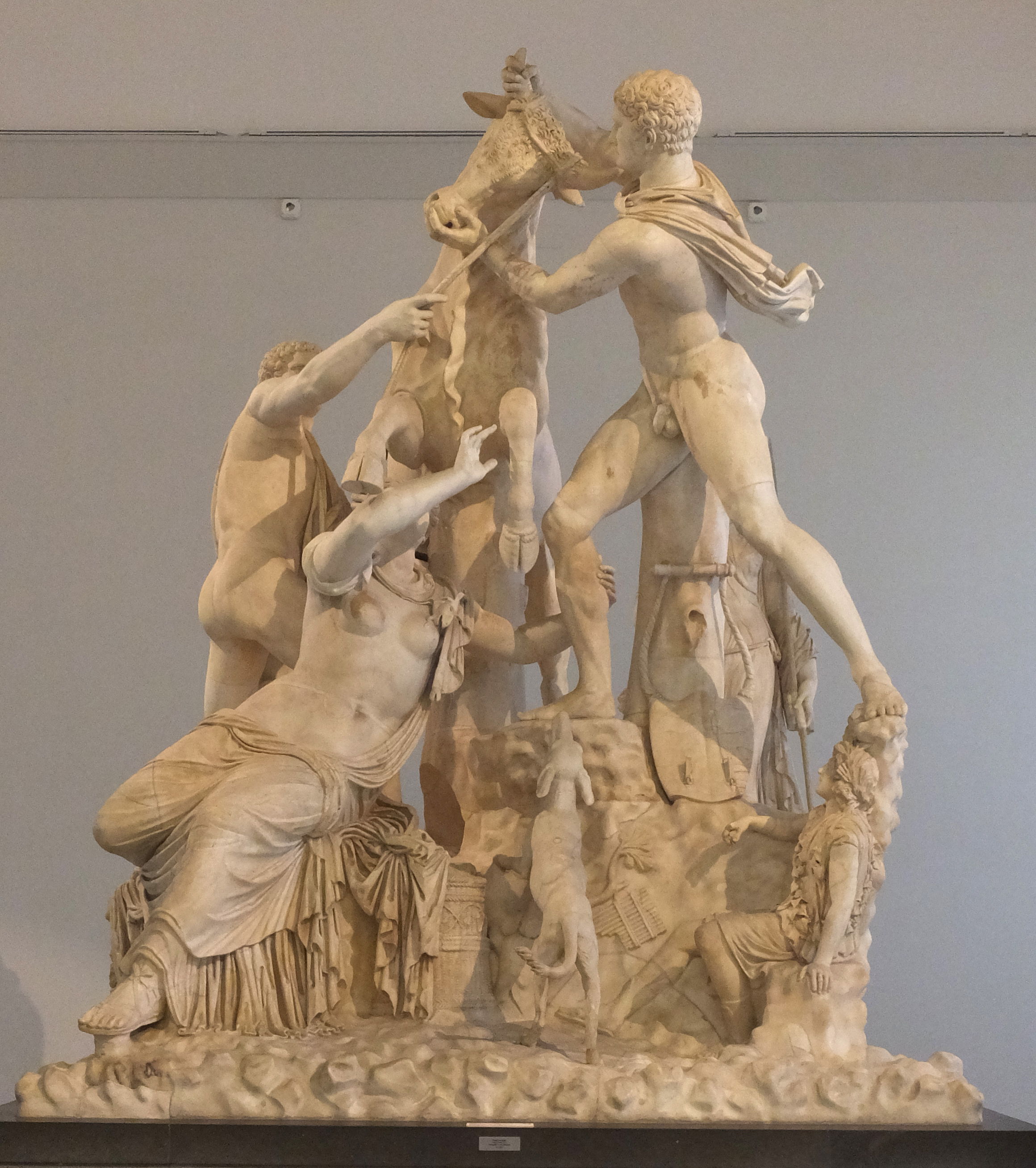
The Farnese Bull depicting the punishment of Dirke by Amphion and Zethos

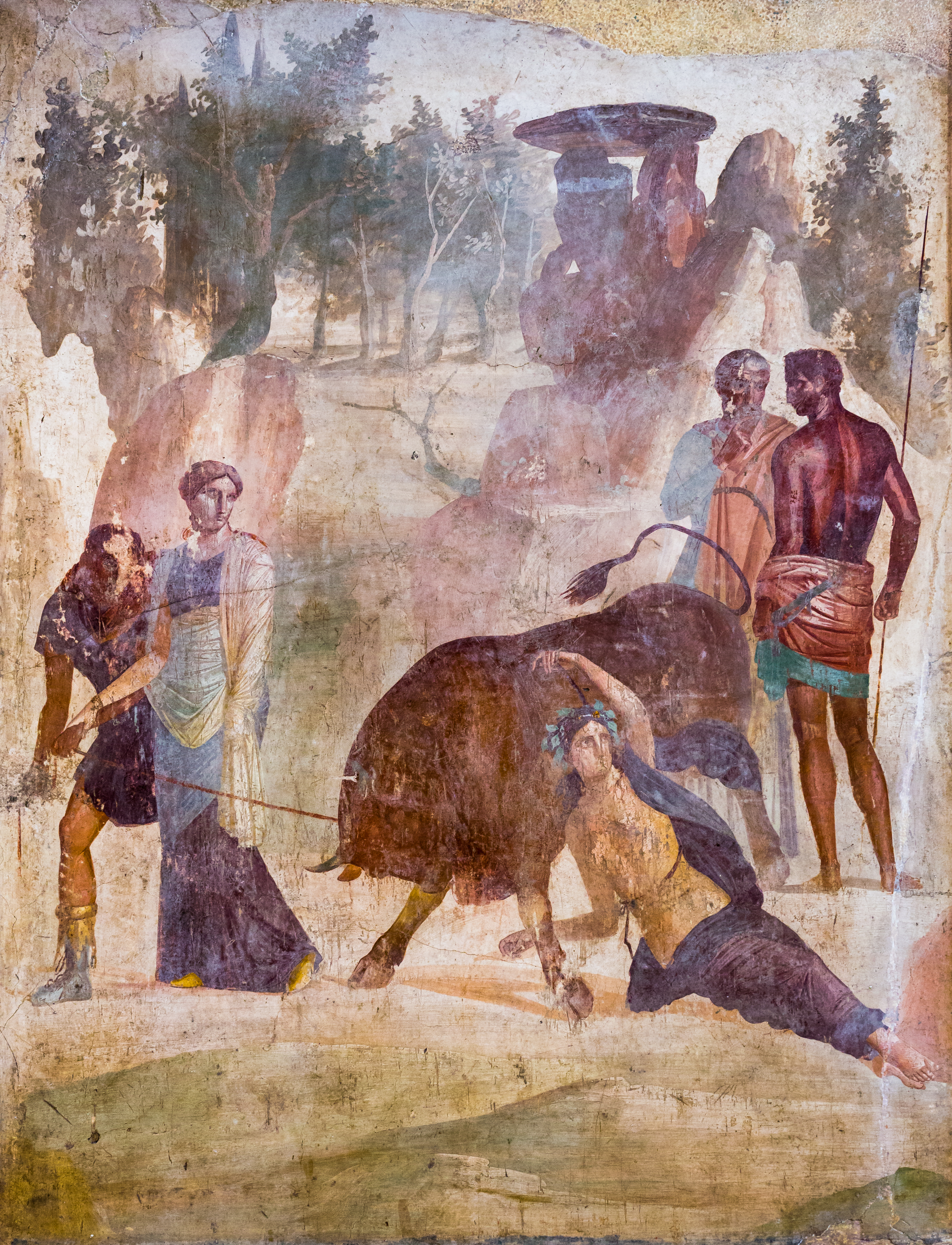
Dirce being tied to a bull by Amphion as Zethus looks on; Antiope tries to stop her son's hand. (fresco, 1st century AD)

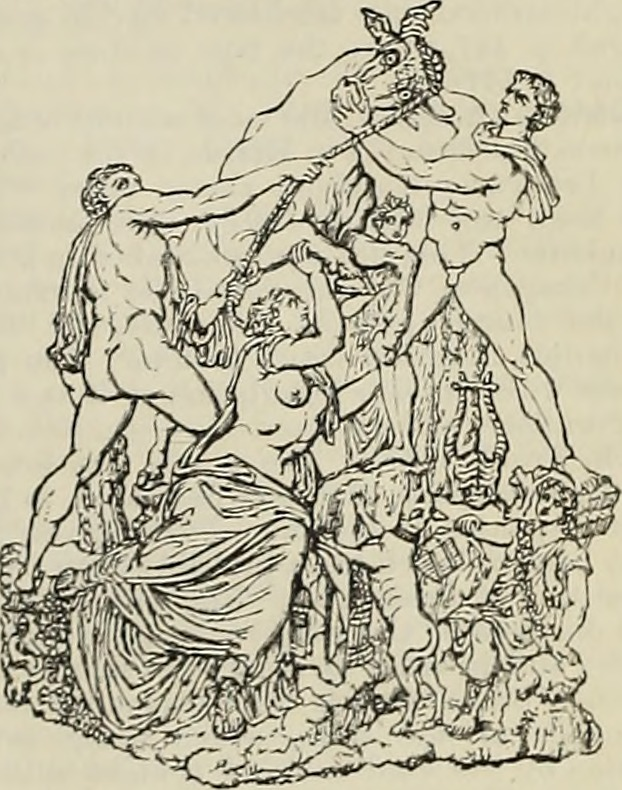
The Famese Bull

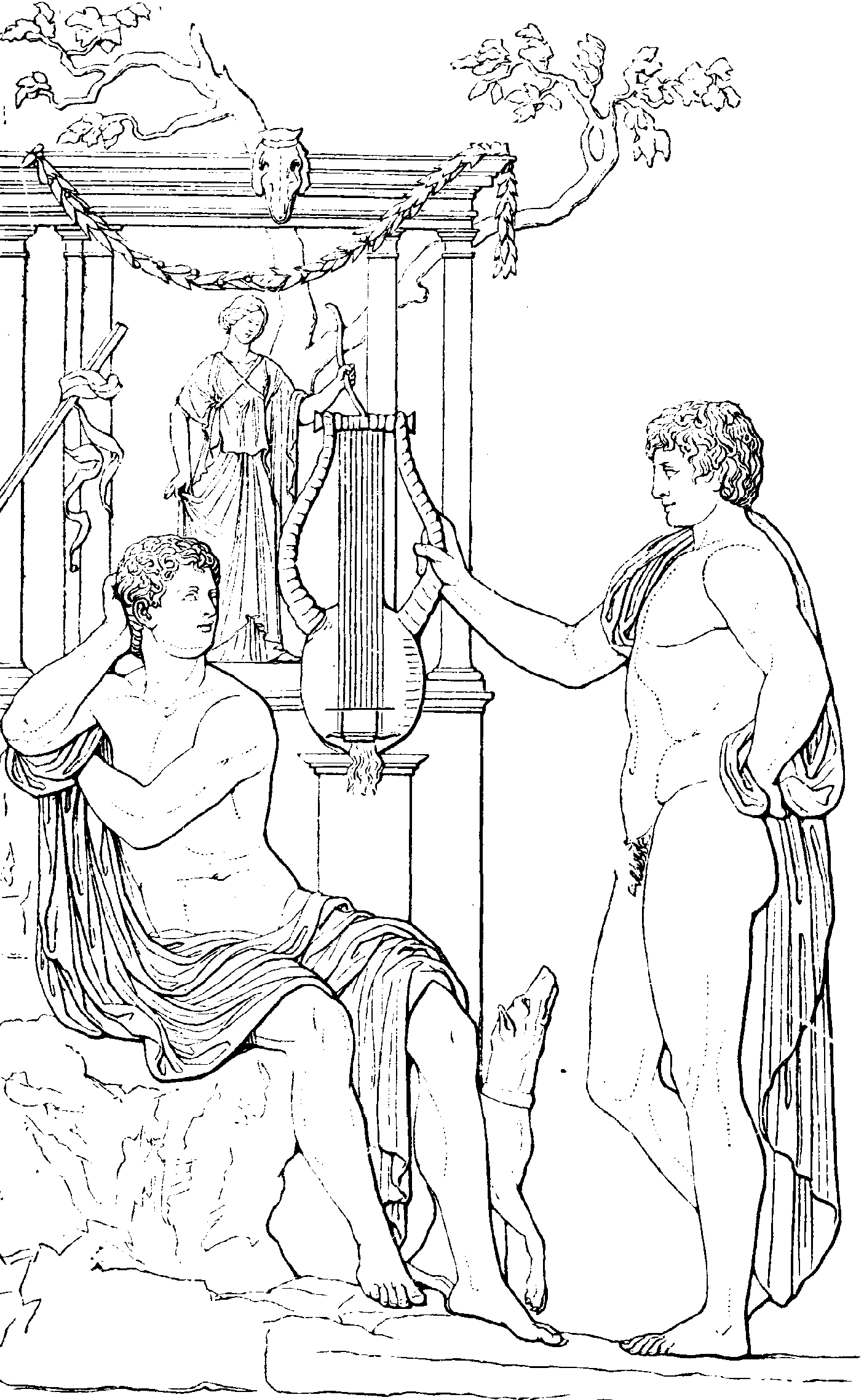
Amphion and Zethus

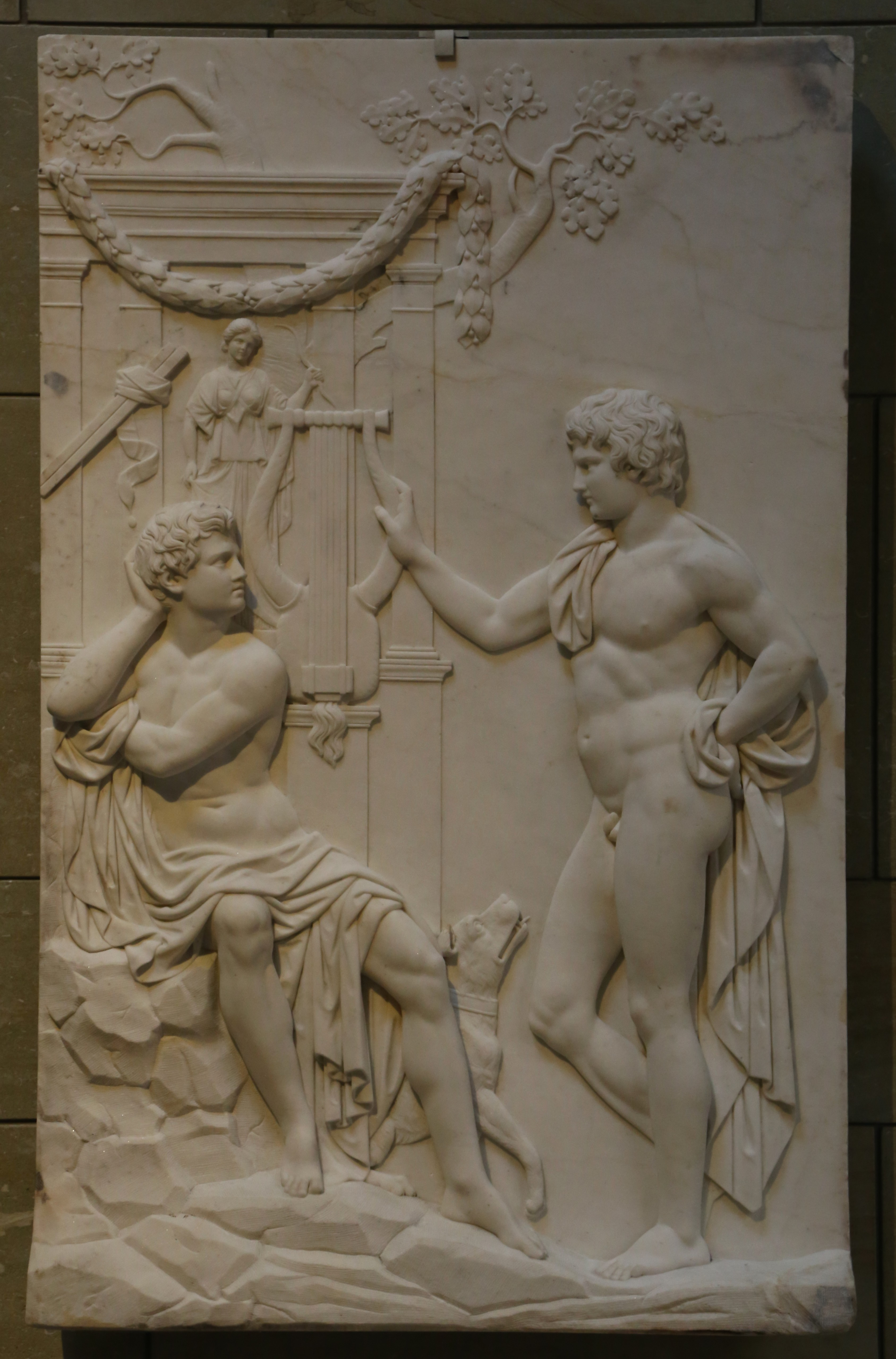
Julius Troschel, Amphion and Zethus (1840–1850), Neue Pinakothek.

== See also ==
- Divine twins

== Mention in Ancient Sources ==
- Plato, Gorgias, 485e.

== Notes ==
Regnal titles
Preceded by Lycus	Mythical Kings of Thebes (jointly)	Succeeded by Laius
