= Hyperenor =

Several figures in Greek mythology

In Greek mythology, the name Hyperenor (/ˌhɪpəˈriːnɔːr/; Ancient Greek: Ὺπερήνωρ, lit. 'overbearing, over-weening, violent') may refer to:

- Hyperenor, one of the five surviving Spartoi or men that grew forth from the dragon's teeth which Cadmus sowed at Thebes. The other four surviving Spartoi were Chthonius, Udaeus, Pelorus, and Echion. He was worshipped as a hero at Thebes.
- Hyperenor, son of Poseidon and Alcyone, brother of Hyrieus and Aethusa. See also Hyperes.
- Hyperenor, a warrior in the army of the Seven against Thebes and was killed by Haemon.
- Hyperenor, a Trojan, son of Panthous and Phrontis, thus brother of Euphorbus; said to have been married, without mention of his wife's name. Was killed by Menelaus. His death is a subject of a subsequent conversation between Menelaus and Euphorbus.
- Hyperenor, one of the Suitors of Penelope who came from Same along with other 22 wooers. He, with the other suitors, was shot dead by Odysseus with the aid of Eumaeus, Philoetius, and Telemachus.
