= Udaeus (mythology) =

In Greek mythology, Udaeus (/uˈdi.us/ or /juːˈdiːəs/; Ancient Greek: Οὐδαῖος, romanized: Oudaios) was one of the Spartoi or men that grew forth from the dragon's teeth which Cadmus sowed at Thebes. The other four surviving Spartoi were Chthonius, Hyperenor, Pelorus, and Echion. Udaeus was the ancestor of the seer Tiresias.
