= Pelorus (mythology) =

In Greek mythology, Pelorus (Ancient Greek: Πέλορος, romanized: Pelōros) may refer to several distinct characters:

- Pelorus, also called Peloreus, one of the Giants.
- Pelorus, also Pelor (Πέλωρ), one of the Spartoi or men that grew forth from the dragon's teeth which Cadmus sowed at Thebes. The other four surviving Spartoi were Chthonius, Hyperenor, Udaeus, and Echion.
- Pelorus, the man whom the festival of Peloria was named after. He brought news of the violent earthquakes in Haemonia where the former country covered by the lake became visible plains as the waters drained off. Pelasgus delighted with his statement, held a bountiful banquet for him worthy of an honourable guest and Pelorus was similarly served cordially by the other nobles. Afterwards, the Pelasgians occupied the newly revealed district and they instituted a festival (Peloria) as a sort of imitation of the feast which took place on that occasion and sacrificing to Zeus Pelor.
