= Neis (mythology) =

Mythological Theban princess

In Greek mythology Neis (Ancient Greek: Νηίς, romanized: Nēís) is a princess from the ancient Greek city-kingdom of Thebes and the namesake of the Neitian Gate, one of the seven gates of Thebes. Neis is the daughter of either one of Thebes' twin kings, Amphion and Zethus, by their wives Niobe or Aëdon respectively. Neis is mostly mentioned in later sources.

== Family ==
Neis was a princess of Thebes. She was either the daughter of Queen Niobe and King Amphion (thus one of the numerous Niobids, usually twelve or fourteen in number), or Queen Aëdon and King Zethus, Amphion's twin brother. Although the Aëdon-Zethus parentage is more common, usually Aëdon and Zethus have just one child, the boy Itylus.

== Mythology ==
The Theban princess Neis gave her name to the Neitian Gate of seven-gate Thebes. The traveller Pausanias also confirms the tale, but refers to Neis as a boy rather than a girl.

If she is taken to be a daughter of Niobe and Amphion, then Neis perished along with all her brothers and sisters when the Olympian gods Artemis and Apollo shot all the Niobids dead in punishment for their mother boasting that she was better than their mother Leto on account of the number of children she produced, as opposed to Leto's mere two. In a lesser known version, Niobe's father Assaon invited all the Niobids to a banquet and there he burned them to death because their mother had refused to yield to his incestuous embraces.

== Interpretation ==
In the versions where she is the daughter of Zethus and Aëdon, her mother was jealous of Niobe's vast progeny compared to her own, so she tried to kill Niobe's firstborn Amaleus, but accidentally killed her own son Itylus instead. In these cases, Aëdon is a direct parallel of the goddess Leto; both mothers of two children, a boy and a girl, who feel threatened by Niobe's many children and punish the boastful queen by harming said children.

== See also ==
- Macaria
- Castalia
- Stentor

== Bibliography ==
- Avery, Catherine B., ed. (1962). New Century Classical Handbook. New York, US: Appleton-Century-Crofts.
- Bell, Robert E. (1991). Women of Classical Mythology: A Biographical Dictionary. ABC-Clio. ISBN 9780874365818.
- Fontenrose, Joseph Eddy (1948). "The Sorrows of Ino and Procne". Transactions and Proceedings of the American Philological Association. 79. Johns Hopkins University Press: 125–167. doi:10.2307/283358. JSTOR 283358.
- Gazis, George A. (August 22, 2025). "Lamenting About the Wrong Crime". In Abbattista, Alessandra; Blanco, Chiara; Haley, Maria; Savani, Giacomo (eds.). Tereus Through the Ages: Reassembling the Myth of Tereus. De Gruyter. ISBN 9783110728705.
- Hard, Robin (2004). The Routledge Handbook of Greek Mythology: Based on H.J. Rose's "Handbook of Greek Mythology". Routledge. ISBN 9780415186360.
- Harder, Ruth Elisabeth (October 1, 2006). "Niobe". In Cancik, Hubert; Schneider, Helmuth (eds.). Brill's New Pauly. Translated by Christine F. Salazar. Zurich: Brill Reference Online. ISSN 1574-9347.
- Johannsen, Nina (October 1, 2006). "Zethus". In Cancik, Hubert; Schneider, Helmuth (eds.). Brill's New Pauly. Translated by Christine F. Salazar. Kiel: Brill Reference Online. ISSN 1574-9347.
- Levaniouk, Olga (2011). "12: Aëdon". Eve of the Festival: Making Myth in Odyssey 19. Hellenic Studies Series 46. Washington, DC: Center for Hellenic Studies.
- Parthenius (2010). "Suffering in Love". In J. L. Lightfoot (ed.). Hellenistic Collection: Philitas. Alexander of Aetolia. Hermesianax. Euphorion. Parthenius. Loeb Classical Library 508. Translated by J. L. Lightfoot. Cambridge, MA: Harvard University Press. ISBN 9780674996366.
- Pausanias, Description of Greece with an English Translation by W.H.S. Jones, Litt.D., and H.A. Ormerod, M.A., in 4 Volumes. Cambridge, MA, Harvard University Press; London, William Heinemann Ltd. 1918. Online version at the Perseus Digital Library.
- Schmitz, Leonhard (1867). Smith, William (ed.). A Dictionary of Greek and Roman Biography and Mythology. Boston.
