= Epirus (mythology) =

Epirus or Epeiros (Ancient Greek: Ἤπειρος, romanized: Ḗpeiros), in Greek mythology, was a member of the Theban royal family as the daughter of princess Agave and Echion, one of the Spartoi. She was the sister of Pentheus, successor of King Cadmus of Thebes.

== Mythology ==
Epirus accompanied Cadmus and Harmonia while they were carrying the body of Pentheus. While in Epirus, she died and was buried in a thicket; this thicket was later considered sacred to her and the entire country was renamed after her. This same thicket was also considered the place where the king's son Cichyrus accidentally slew a young girl named Anthippe while hunting. In remorse he flung himself into a ravine and was killed. The king's people, the Chaonians, founded the city of Cichyrus around the ravine.
