= Peloreus =

Giant in Greek mythology

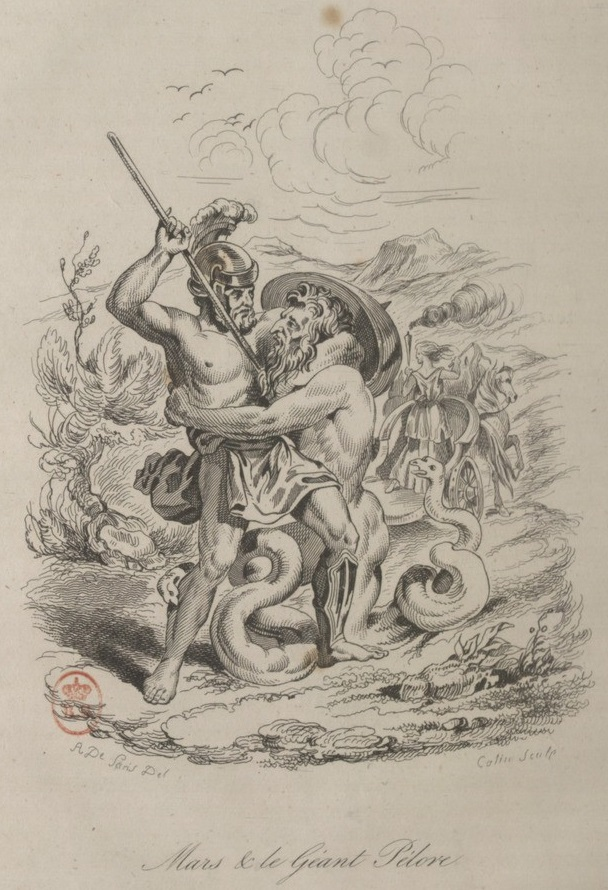
“Mars & the Giant Peloreus” by Joseph-Jacques Odolant-Desnos (1839).

In Greek mythology, Peloreus (Ancient Greek: Πελωρεὺς) or Pelorus (Πέλορος) was one of the Gigantes, children of Gaia and Tartarus.

== Mythology ==
In Nonnus' Dionysiaca, Peloreus and his brothers were incited by Hera to fight against Dionysus. This was recounted in the following passage:

But Inachian Hera had not softened her rancorous rage for Argos maddened; she remembered the frenzy of the Achaian women and prepared again to attack Bacchos. She addressed her deceitful prayers to Allmother Earth, crying out upon the doings of Zeus and the valour of Dionysos, who had destroyed that cloud of numberless earthborn Indians; and when the lifebringing mother heard that the son of Semele had wiped out the Indian nation with speedy fate, she groaned still more thinking of her children. Then she armed all round Bacchos the mountainranging tribes of giants, earth's own brood, and goaded her huge sons to battle:

"My sons, make your attack with hightowering rocks against clustergarlanded Dionysos — catch this Indianslayer, this destroyer of my family, this son of Zeus, and let me not see him ruling with Zeus a bastard monarch of Olympos! Bind him, bind Bacchos fast, that he may attend in the chamber when I bestow Hebe on Porphyrion as a wife, and give Cythereia to Chthonios, when I sing Brighteyes the bedfellow of Encelados, and Artemis of Alcyoneus.

Bring Dionysos to me, that I may enrage Cronin when he sees Lyaios a slave and the captive of my spear. Or wound him with cutting steel and kill him for me like Zagreus, that one may say, god or mortal, that Earth in her anger has twice armed her slayers against the breed of Cronides — the older Titans against the former Dionysos, the younger Giants against Dionysos later born."

With these words she excited all the host of the Giants, and the battalions of the Earthborn set forth to war, one bearing a bulwark of Nysa, one who had sliced off with steel the flank of a cloudhigh precipice, each with these rocks for missiles armed him against Dionysos; one hastened to the conflict bearing the rocky hill of some land with its base in the brine, another with a reef torn from a brinegirt isthmus. Peloreus took up Pelion with hightowering peak as a missile in his innumerable arms, and left the cave of Philyra bare. . .

According to Claudian, Pelorus was killed by Mars, the Roman equivalent of Ares, during the Gigantomachy as depicted on the text below:

Dashing into the fray he (i.e. Mars) first encounters Pelorus and transfixes him with his sword, where about the groin the two-bodied serpent unites with his own giant form, and thus with one blow puts an end to three lives. Exulting in his victory he drives his chariot over the dying giant's limbs till the wheels ran red with blood.
