= Echinus (Thessaly) =

Town and polis in ancient Thessaly

Coordinates: 38°53′45″N 22°43′31″E

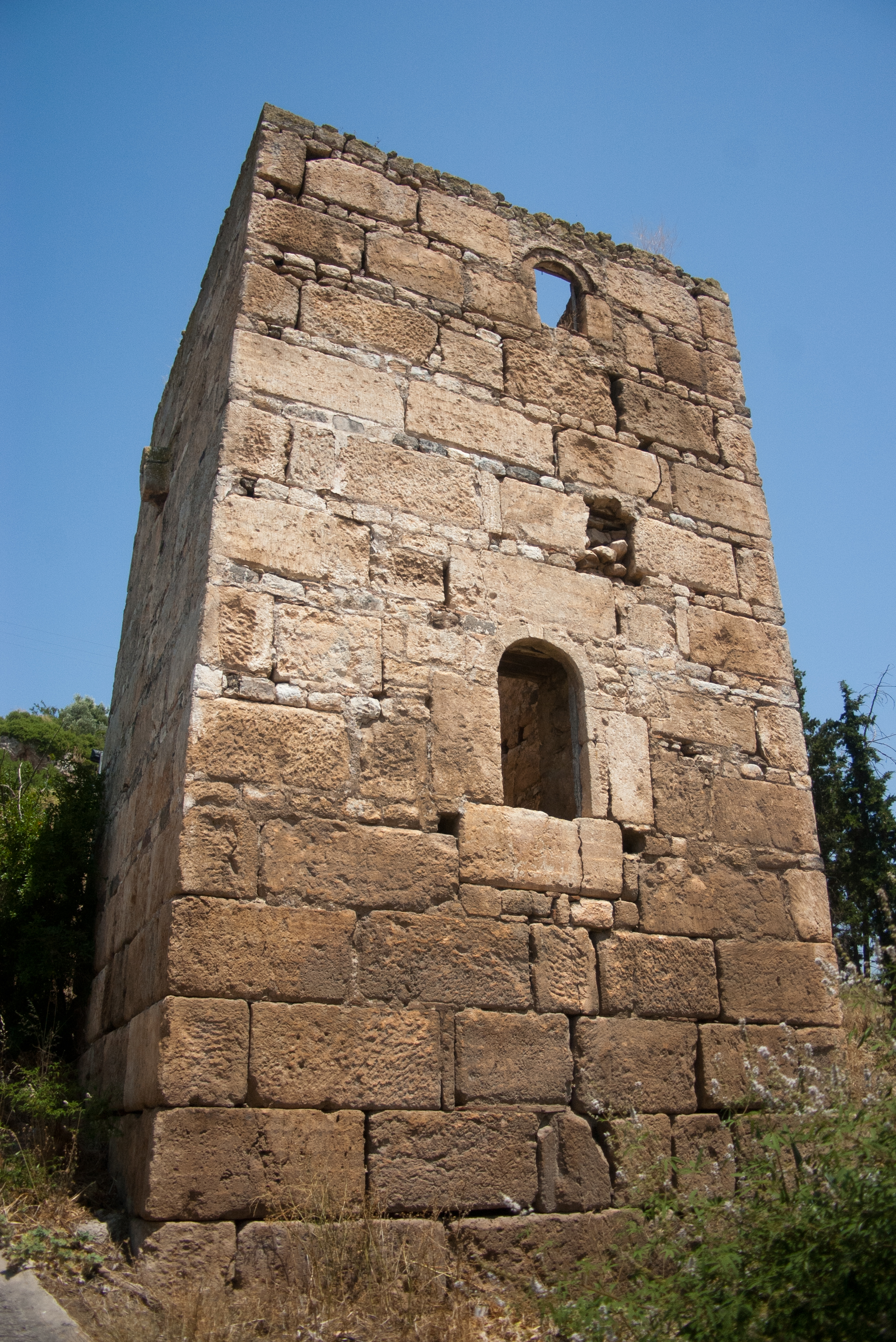
The medieval tower of Achinos, built by reusing ancient material (spolia)

Map showing ancient Thessaly. Echinus is shown to the bottom centre on the Malian Gulf.

Echinus or Echinos (Ancient Greek: Ἐχῖνος) was a town and polis of Phthiotis or of Malis in ancient Thessaly, situated upon the Malian Gulf, between Lamia and Larissa Cremaste, in a fertile district. It was said to derive its name from Echion, who sprang from the dragon's teeth. Demosthenes says that Echinus was taken by Philip II of Macedon, the father of Alexander the Great, from the Thebans. Philip II granted the town to the Malians in 342 BCE. From c. 235 BCE, it was part of the Aetolian League until 210 BCE, when it was captured by Philip V of Macedon, after a siege of some length. The Romans captured the city in 193 BCE and gave it back to the Malians in 189 BCE. Strabo mentions it as one of the Grecian cities which had been destroyed by an earthquake.

Under Roman rule, the city was part of Achaea Phthiotis and by extension of Thessaly, and experienced a period of great prosperity, as testified by archaeological finds. In late Antiquity the city was an episcopal see, with its bishops taking part in the councils of Ephesus (431 AD) and Chalcedon (451 AD). Emperor Justinian I renovated its fortifications, but the 551 Beirut earthquake and tsunami caused major damage, and the town probably never recovered. With the onset of the Slavic invasions a few decades later, the site was probably entirely abandoned.

The city continues to be mentioned as an episcopal see (a suffragan see of Larissa) until the 13th century, but was probably not inhabited. At most a small medieval fortification—of which a tower, built from spolia, and traces of two curtain walls, probably of late Byzantine date, survive—must have been erected in the ruins of the ancient acropolis, perhaps as late as the early Frankokratia period. Apart from these ancient and medieval ruins, a church dedicated to the Dormition was erected there in Ottoman times, while in the modern village, ancient material, including a mosaic floor, were reused in the Church of St. Athanasios.

The ancient see of Echinus has been revived as a Roman Catholic titular bishopric.

Its site is marked by the modern village of Achinos, which is only a slight corruption of the ancient name. The modern village stands upon the side of a hill, the summit of which was occupied by the ancient acropolis. Edward Dodwell remarks from his visit in the early 19th century, that it appears as well from its situation as its works, to have been a place of great strength, "Opposite the Acropolis, at the distance of a few hundred paces, is a hill, where there are some ruins, and foundations of large blocks, probably a temple."
