= Dragon's teeth (mythology) =

Aspect of Greek mythology

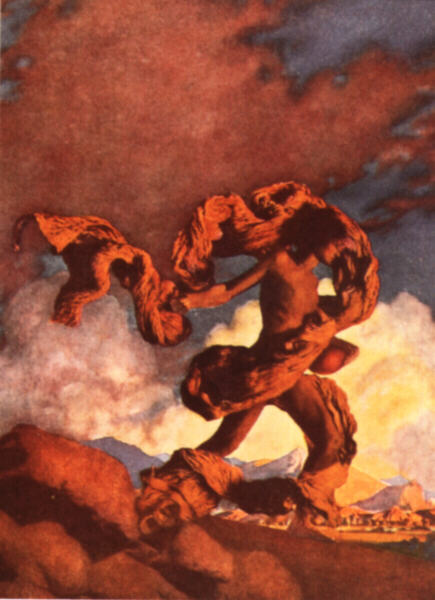
Cadmus Sowing the Dragon's Teeth, by Maxfield Parrish, 1908

In Greek myth, dragon's teeth (Greek: ὀδόντες (τοῦ) δράκοντος, odontes (tou) drakontos) feature prominently in the legends of the Phoenician prince Cadmus and in Jason's quest for the Golden Fleece. In each case, the dragons are present. Their teeth, once planted, would grow into fully armed warriors.

== Myths ==
=== Cadmus and the Spartoi ===
Cadmus, the bringer of literacy and civilization, killed the sacred dragon that guarded the spring of Ares. According to the Bibliotheca, Athena gave Cadmus half of the dragon's teeth, advising him to sow them. When he did, fierce armed men, known as Spartoi (Ancient Greek: Σπαρτοί, literal translation: "sown [men]", from σπείρω, speírō, "to sow"), sprang up from the furrows. Cadmus threw a stone among them, because he feared them, and they, thinking that the stone had been thrown by one of the others, fought each other until only five of them remained — Echion (future father of Pentheus), Udaeus, Chthonius, Hyperenor and Pelorus. These five helped Cadmus to found the city of Thebes, but Cadmus was forced to be a slave to Ares for eight years to atone for killing the dragon. At the end of the year, he was given Harmonia, the daughter of Aphrodite and Ares, to be his wife.

However, Hellanicus writes that only five Spartoi sprang up, omitting the battle between them. In his version, Zeus had to intervene to save Cadmus from the anger of Ares, who wished to kill him. Echion later married Agave, the daughter of Cadmus, and their son Pentheus succeeded Cadmus as king. According to one source, all the descendants of the Spartoi had a dragon-like mark in their body. King Creon used it to recognize his grandson Maeon, who had been raised in secret without his knowledge.

=== Jason ===
Similarly, Jason was challenged by King Aeëtes of Colchis to sow dragon's teeth from Athena in order to obtain the Golden Fleece. Medea, Aeëtes' daughter, advised Jason to throw a stone between the warriors that sprang from the earth. The warriors started fighting and killing each other, leaving no survivor but Jason.

== Modern references ==
The classical legends of Cadmus and Jason have given rise to the phrase "to sow dragon's teeth". This is used as a metaphor to refer to doing something that has the effect of fomenting disputes. In Swedish, the myth is the source of the idiom "draksådd" (dragon-seed) with the meaning of spreading corrupting ideas, or in the broader sense, actions with dire consequences.

John Milton references the myth in his Areopagitica:

"For books are not absolutely dead things, but ...do preserve as in a vial the purest efficacy and extraction of that living intellect that bred them. I know they are as lively, and as vigorously productive, as those fabulous Dragon's teeth; and being sown up and down, may chance to spring up armed men"

== Gallery ==
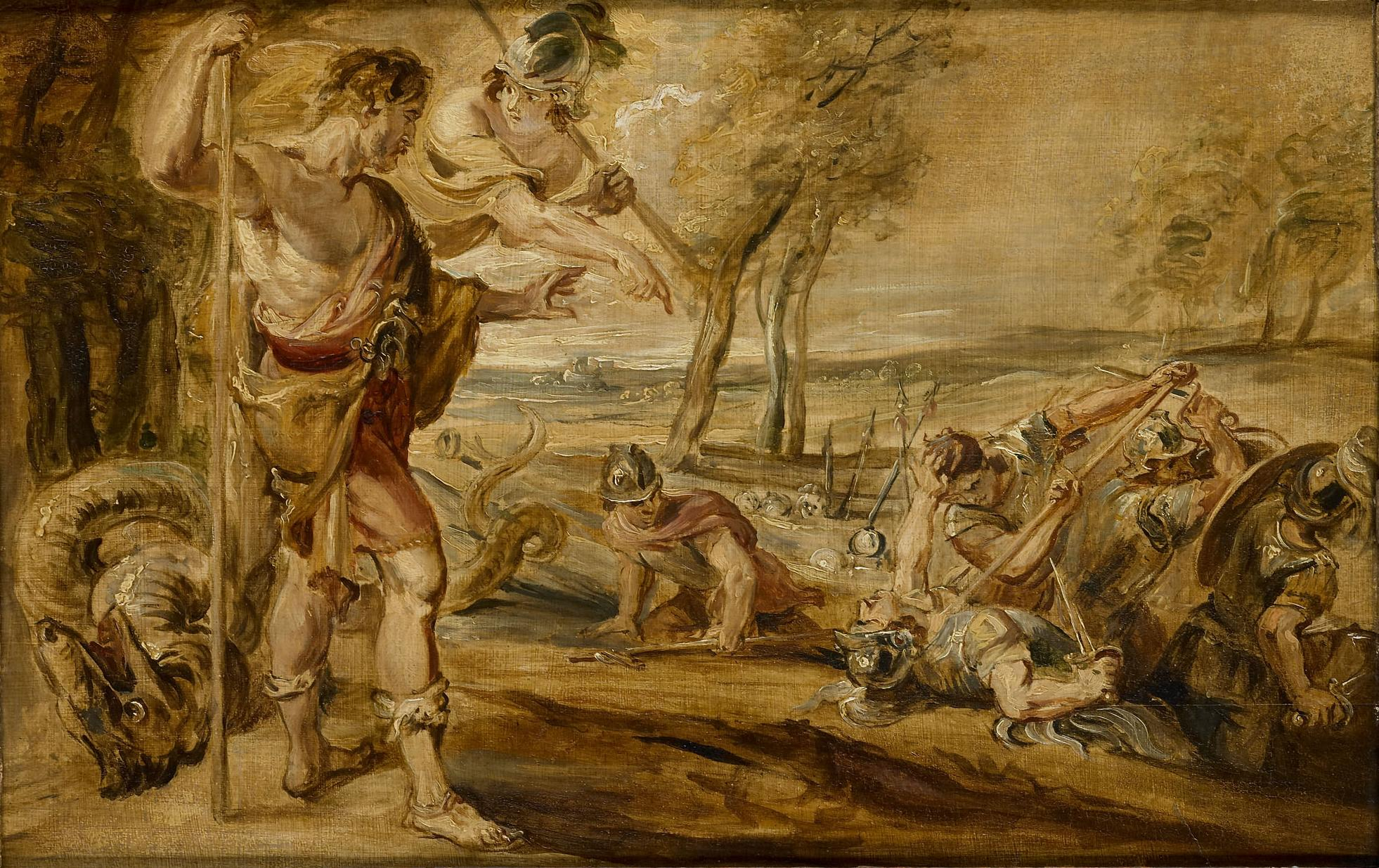
Cadmus sowing dragon's teeth; workshop of Peter Paul Rubens, 17th century

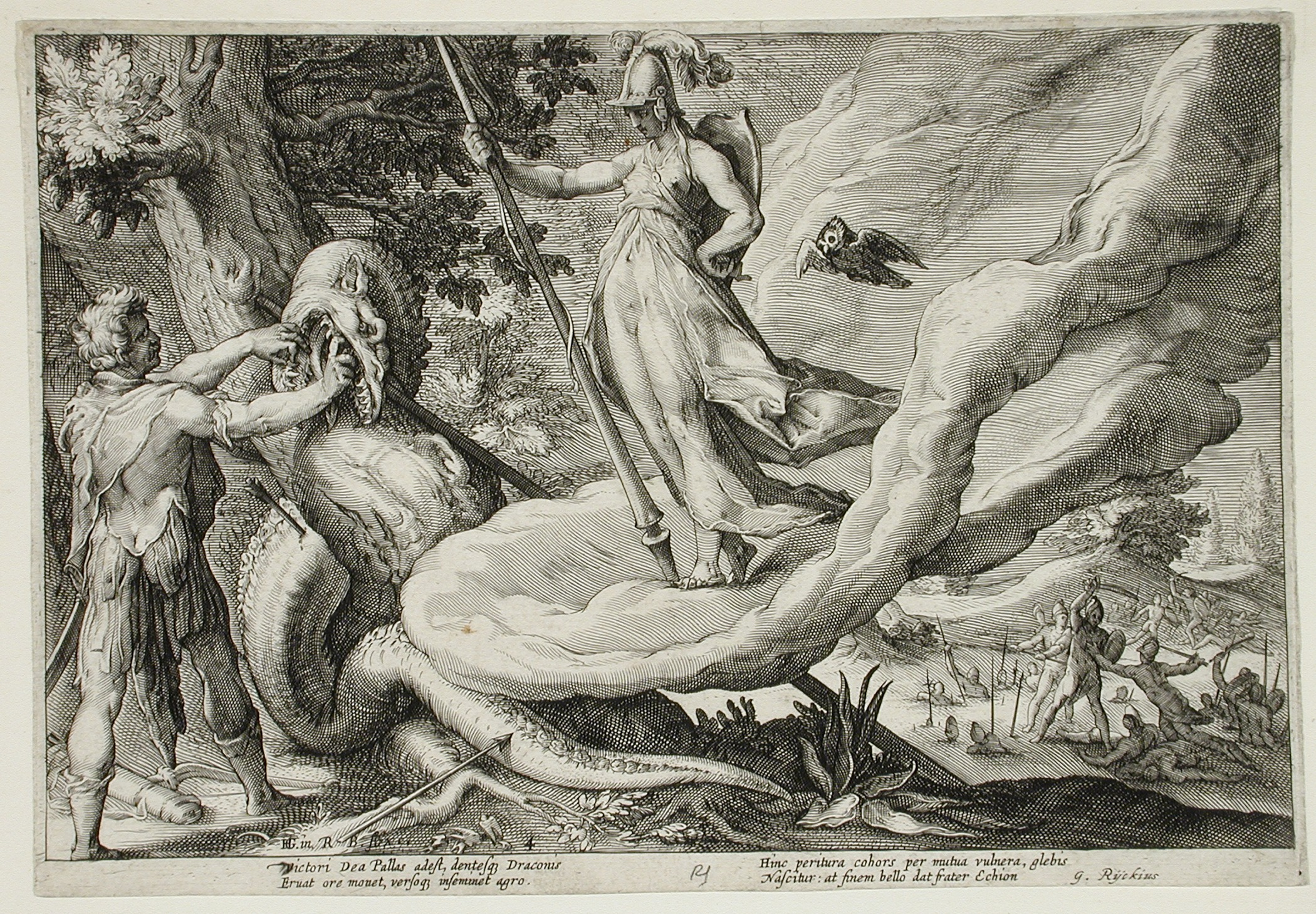
Cadmus Sows the Dragon's Teeth Which Turn into Armed Men, by Hendrik Goltzius, 1615

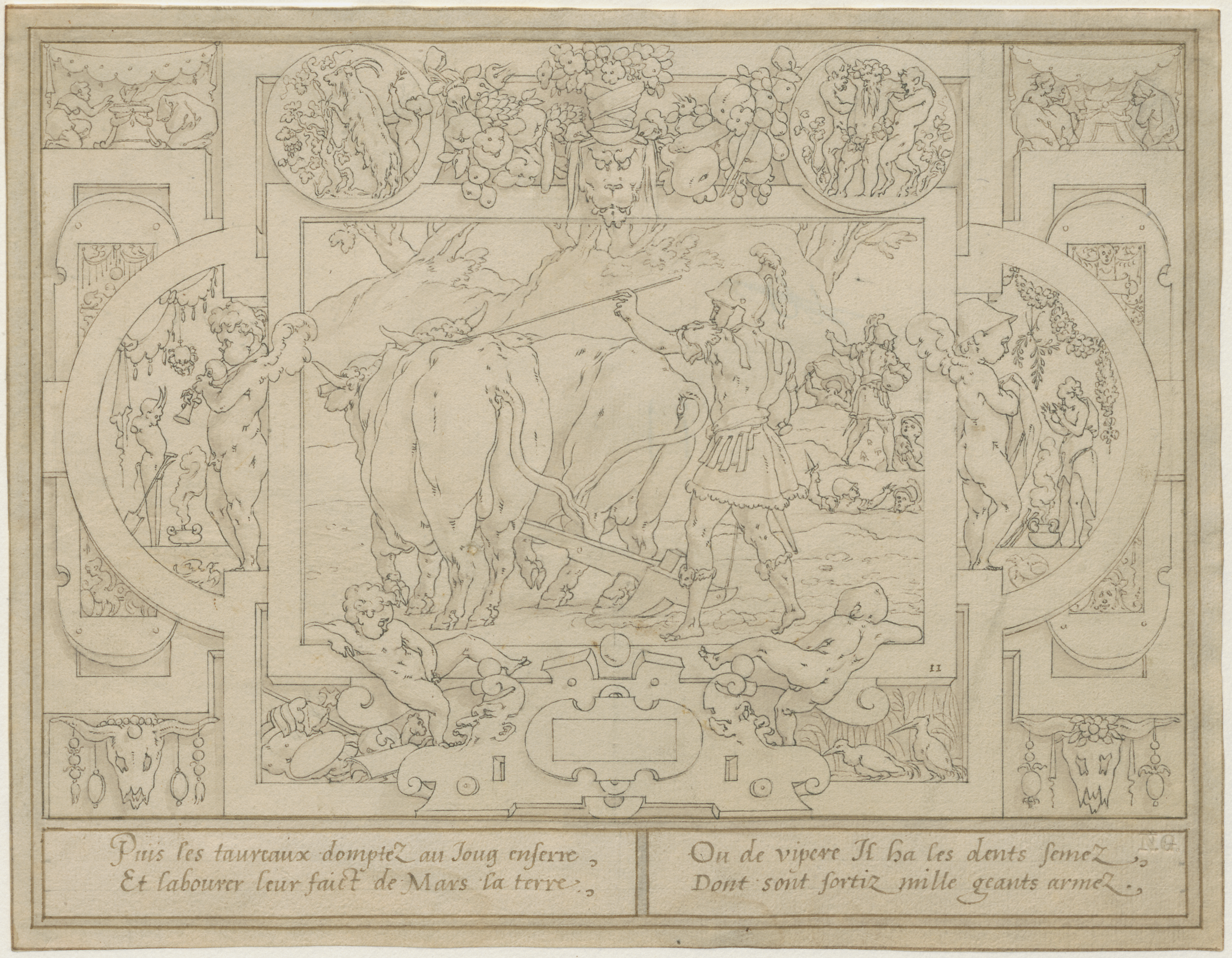
Jason and the Golden Fleece 11: Jason ploughing the earth and sowing the dragon's teeth Thiry, Leonard (ca. 1500–ca. 1550)

== See also ==
- Dragons in Greek mythology
