= Echion =

Name in Greek mythology

In Greek mythology, the name Echion /ɛˈkaɪɒn/ (Ancient Greek: Ἐχῑ́ων, genitive: Ἐχίονος, derived from ἔχις, échis, 'viper') referred to five different beings:

- Echion, one of the Gigantes, known for great strength (though not necessarily great size) and having an ability to change the course or direction of winds.
- Echion, one of the surviving Spartoi, the "sown men" that sprang up from the dragon's teeth sown by Cadmus, the other four Spartoi were Chthonius, Hyperenor, Pelorus, and Udaeus. Echion was principally known for his skill in battle and bravery; "it was Echion who, for his great valor, was preferred by Cadmus to be his son-in-law": Echion was father of Pentheus and Epeiros by Agave. He was credited to be the founder of the Malian city of Echinos. Also, Echion was said to have dedicated a temple of Cybele in Boeotia, and to have assisted Cadmus in the building of Thebes.
- Echion of Alope, son of Hermes and Antianeira (daughter of Menetus) or Laothoe, and brother of Erytus. Together with the latter and stepbrother, Aethalides, they participated in the quest of the Argonauts. Echion and his brother were described as “well skilled in craftiness” which signified the ability they possess as children of the thief-god. Also, he participated in the Calydonian boar hunt, according to Hyginus and Ovid.
- Echion, son of Portheus and one of the Greeks who fought at the Trojan War. He was also one of the men hidden in the Trojan horse, but did not wait for the rope to be brought down and fell to his death. The doomed Greek is a "tough but battle weary warrior, plagued by phantasms of his death".
- Echion, one of the suitors who came with 53 others from Dulichium to compete for Penelope. He, with the other suitors, was shot dead by Odysseus with the help of Eumaeus, Philoetius, and Telemachus.
