= Cadmus =

Greek mythology character, founder of Thebes

- Slayer of the Dragon; Founder and King of Thebes
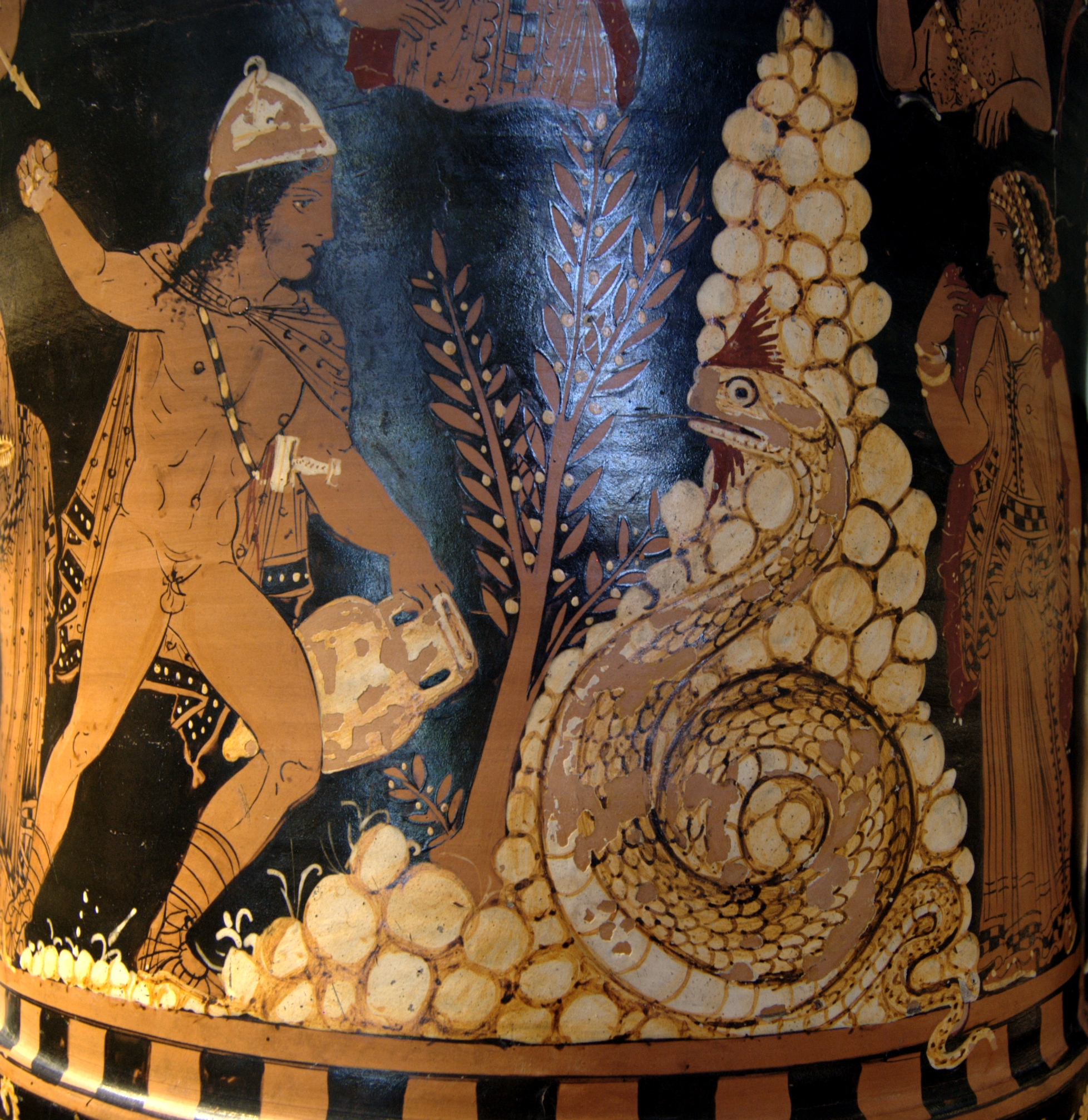
- 4th century BC painting of Cadmus slaying the dragon, from the Louvre in Paris, France
- Abode: Elysium, Thebes

Genealogy
- Born: Tyre, Phoenicia
- Died: Thebes, Boetia, Greece
- Parents: Agenor and Telephassa
- Siblings: Europa, Cilix, Phoenix
- Consort: Harmonia
- Children: Illyrius, Polydorus, Autonoë, Ino, Agave, Semele

In Greek mythology, Cadmus (/ˈkædməs/; Ancient Greek: Κάδμος, romanized: Kádmos) was the legendary founder of Boeotian Thebes. He was, alongside Perseus and Bellerophon, the greatest hero and slayer of monsters before the days of Heracles. He is the son of Agenor, the ruler of a Phoenician kingdom, and his wife Telephassa, although some sources provide differing parentages.

Originally, he was sent by his royal parents to seek out and escort his sister Europa back to Tyre after she was abducted from the shores of Phoenicia by Zeus. In early accounts, Cadmus and Europa were instead the children of Phoenix. Cadmus founded or refounded the Greek city of Thebes, the acropolis of which was originally named Cadmeia in his honour.

He is also credited with the foundation of several cities in Illyria, like Bouthoe and Lychnidus. In ancient Greek literature, the end of the mythical narrative of Cadmus and Harmonia is associated with Enchelei and Illyrians, a tradition deeply rooted among the Illyrian peoples.

His parentage was sometimes modified to suit, e.g. claims of Theban origin name his mother as one of the daughters of Nilus, one of the river gods and deity of the Nile river.

== Overview ==
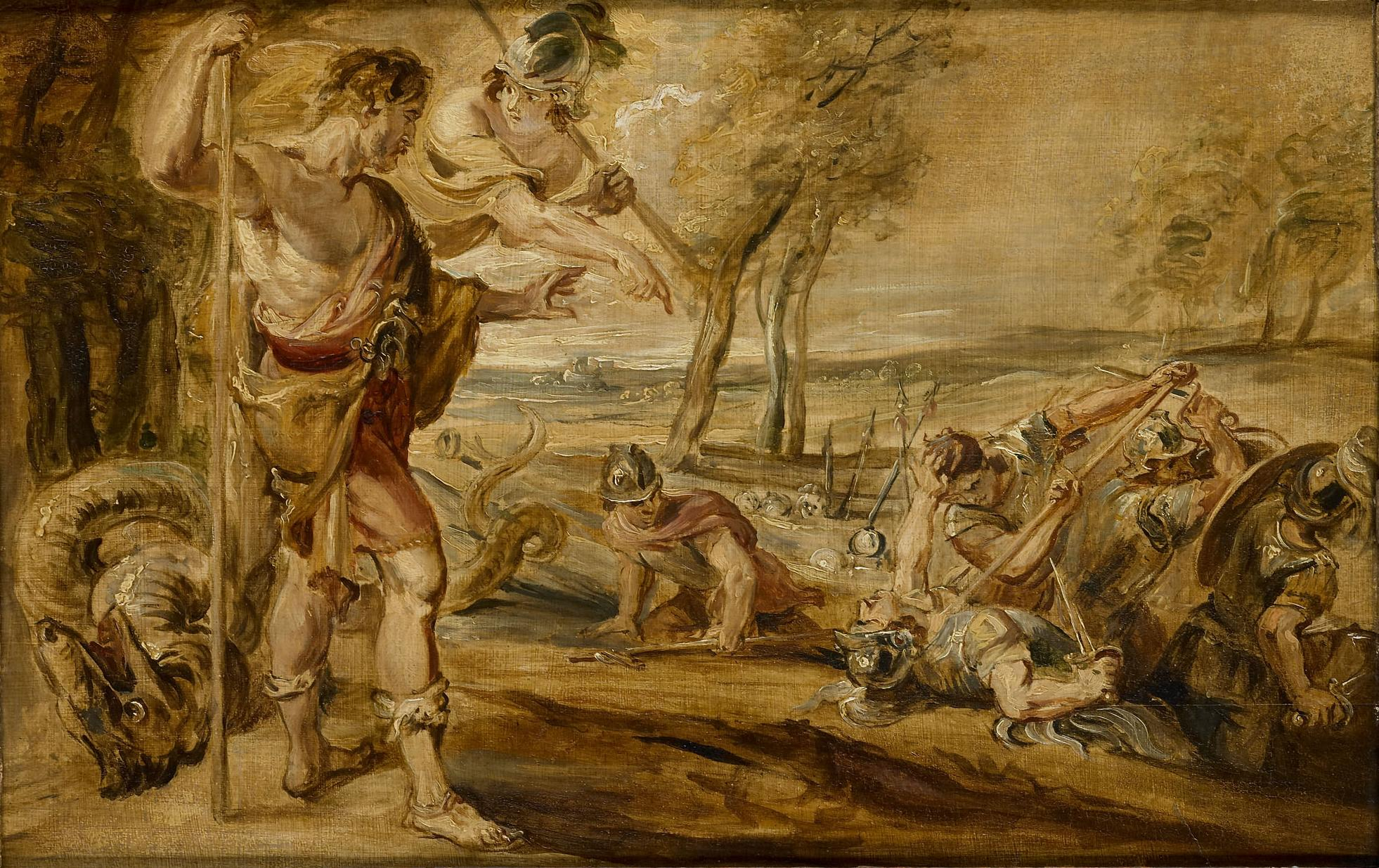
Sowing the Dragon's teeth; workshop of Rubens

Cadmus was credited by the Greek historian Herodotus with introducing the original Phoenician alphabet to the Greeks, who adapted it to form their Greek alphabet. Modern scholarship has almost unanimously agreed with Herodotus concerning the Phoenician source of the alphabet.

Herodotus estimates that Cadmus lived sixteen hundred years before his time, which would be around 2000 BC. Herodotus had seen and described the Cadmean writing in the temple of Apollo at Thebes engraved on certain tripods. He estimated those tripods to date back to the time of Laius the great-grandson of Cadmus. On one of the tripods there was this inscription in Cadmean writing, which, as he attested, resembled Ionian letters: Ἀμφιτρύων μ᾽ ἀνέθηκ᾽ ἐνάρων ἀπὸ Τηλεβοάων ("Amphitryon dedicated me from the spoils of [the battle of] Teleboae.").

Although Greeks like Herodotus dated Cadmus's role in the founding myth of Thebes to well before the Trojan War (or, in modern terms, during the Aegean Bronze Age), this chronology conflicts with most of what is now known or thought to be known about the origins and spread of both the Phoenician and Greek alphabets. The earliest Greek inscriptions match Phoenician letter forms from the late 9th or 8th centuries BC—in any case, the Phoenician alphabet properly speaking was not developed until around 1050 BC (or after the Bronze Age collapse). The Homeric picture of the Mycenaean age betrays extremely little awareness of writing, possibly reflecting the loss during the Dark Age of the earlier Linear B script. Indeed, the only Homeric reference to writing was in the phrase "σήματα λυγρά", sēmata lugra, literally "baneful signs", when referring to the Bellerophontic letter. Linear B tablets have been found in abundance at Thebes, which might lead one to speculate that the legend of Cadmus as bringer of the alphabet could reflect earlier traditions about the origins of Linear B writing in Greece (as Frederick Ahl speculated in 1967).

According to Greek myth, Cadmus's descendants ruled at Thebes on and off for several generations, including the time of the Trojan War.

== Etymology ==
The etymology of Cadmus's name remains uncertain. According to one view, (Note: Supported by Walter Burkert and Liddell–Scott among others) the name originates from Phoenician, from the Semitic root qdm, which signifies "the east", the equation of Kadmos with the Semitic qdm was traced to a publication of 1646 by R. B. Edwards. According to another view, (Note: Supported by Vladimir I. Georgiev, Émile Boisacq and others) the name is of Greek origin, ultimately from the word kekasmenos. (Greek: κεκασμένος, lit. 'excellent').

Possible connected words include the Semitic triliteral root qdm (Ugaritic: 𐎖𐎄𐎎) which signifies "east" in Ugaritic, in Arabic, words derived from the root "qdm" include the verb "qdm" meaning "to come" as well as words meaning "primeval" and "forth" as well as "foot", names derived from it are "Qadim", which means "the elder one",─in Hebrew, qedem means "front", "east" and "ancient times"; the verb qadam (Syriac: ܩܕܡ) means "to be in front", and the Greek kekasmai (<*kekadmai) "to shine". (Note: Robert Beekes rejects these derivations and considers it Pre-Greek.) Therefore, the complete meaning of the name might be: "He who excels" or "from the east".

== Wanderings ==
=== Travel to Samothrace ===
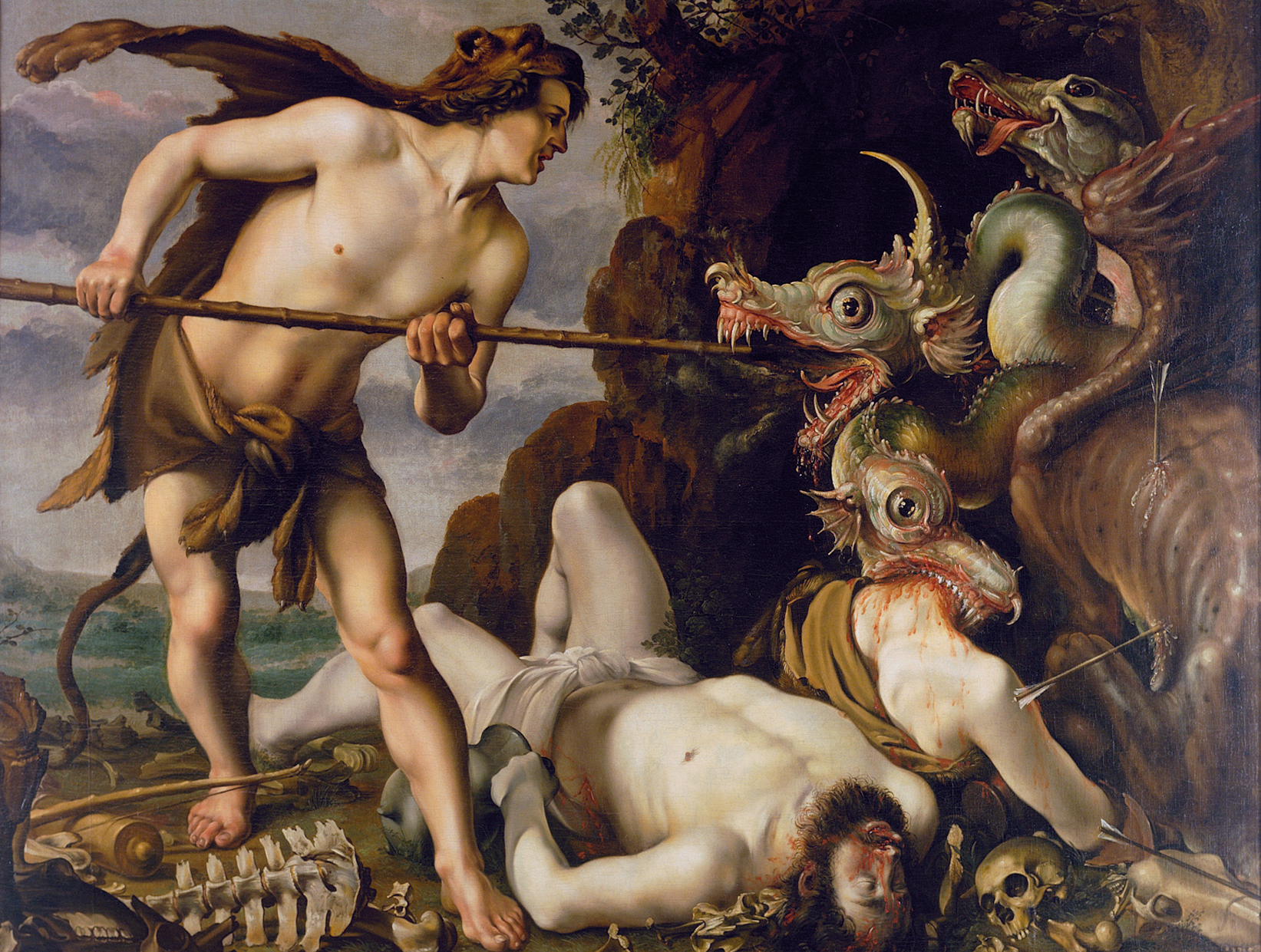
Hendrick Goltzius, Cadmus fighting the Dragon

After his sister Europa had been carried off by Zeus from the shores of Phoenicia, Cadmus was sent out by his father to find her, and enjoined not to return without her. Unsuccessful in his search—or unwilling to go against Zeus—he came to Samothrace, the island sacred to the "Great Gods" or the Kabeiroi, whose mysteries would be celebrated also at Thebes.

Cadmus did not journey alone to Samothrace; he appeared with his mother Telephassa in the company of his nephew (or brother) Thasus, son of Cilix, who gave his name to the island of Thasos nearby. An identically composed trio had other names at Samothrace, according to Diodorus Siculus: the Pleiad Electra and her two sons, Dardanos and Eetion or Iasion. There was a fourth figure, Electra's daughter, Harmonia, whom Cadmus took away as a bride, as Zeus had abducted Europa.

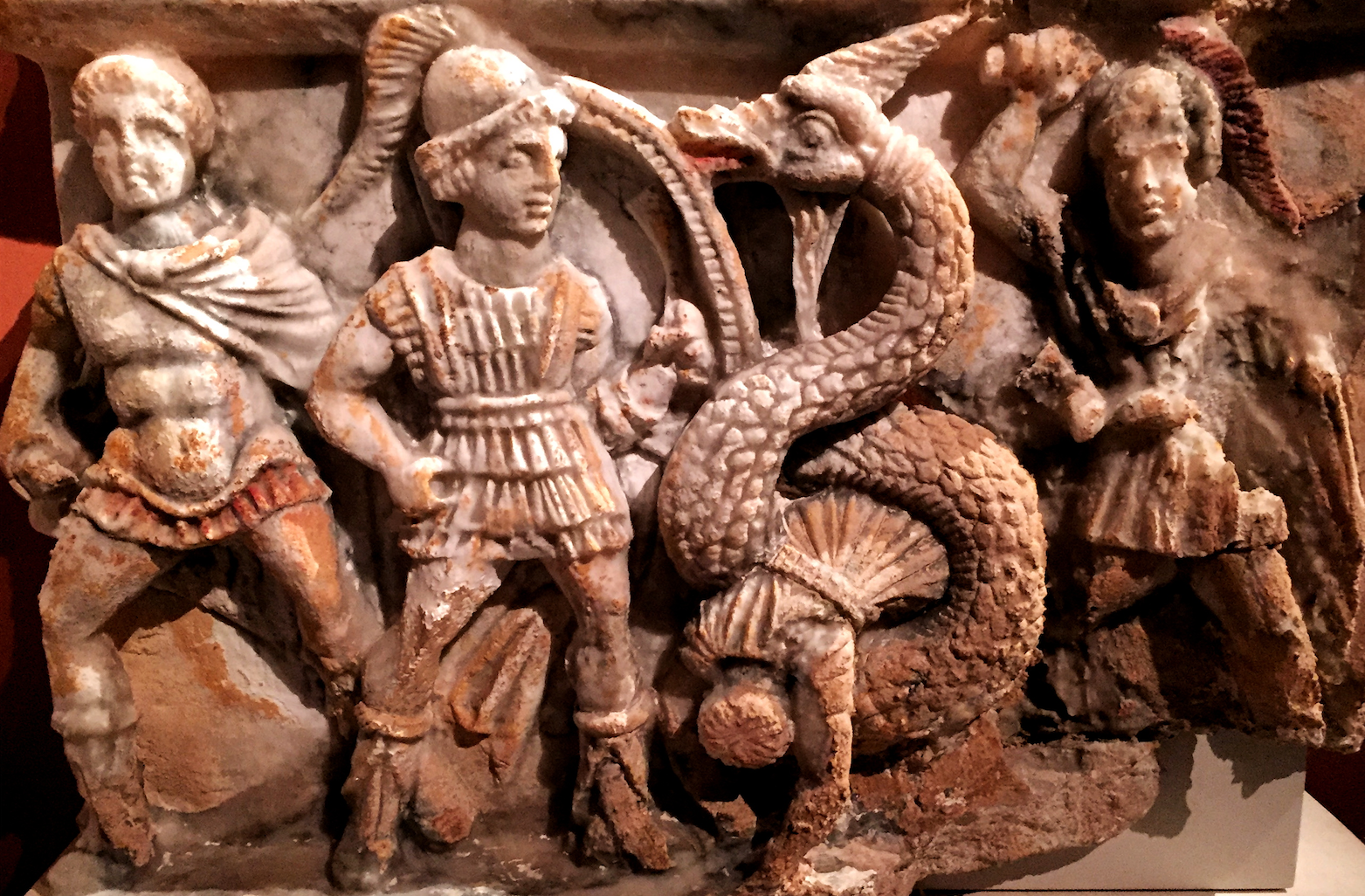
Cadmus and the Serpent (c. 100 BC)

The wedding was the first celebrated on Earth to which the gods brought gifts, according to Diodorus and dined with Cadmus and his bride.

=== Founder of Thebes ===
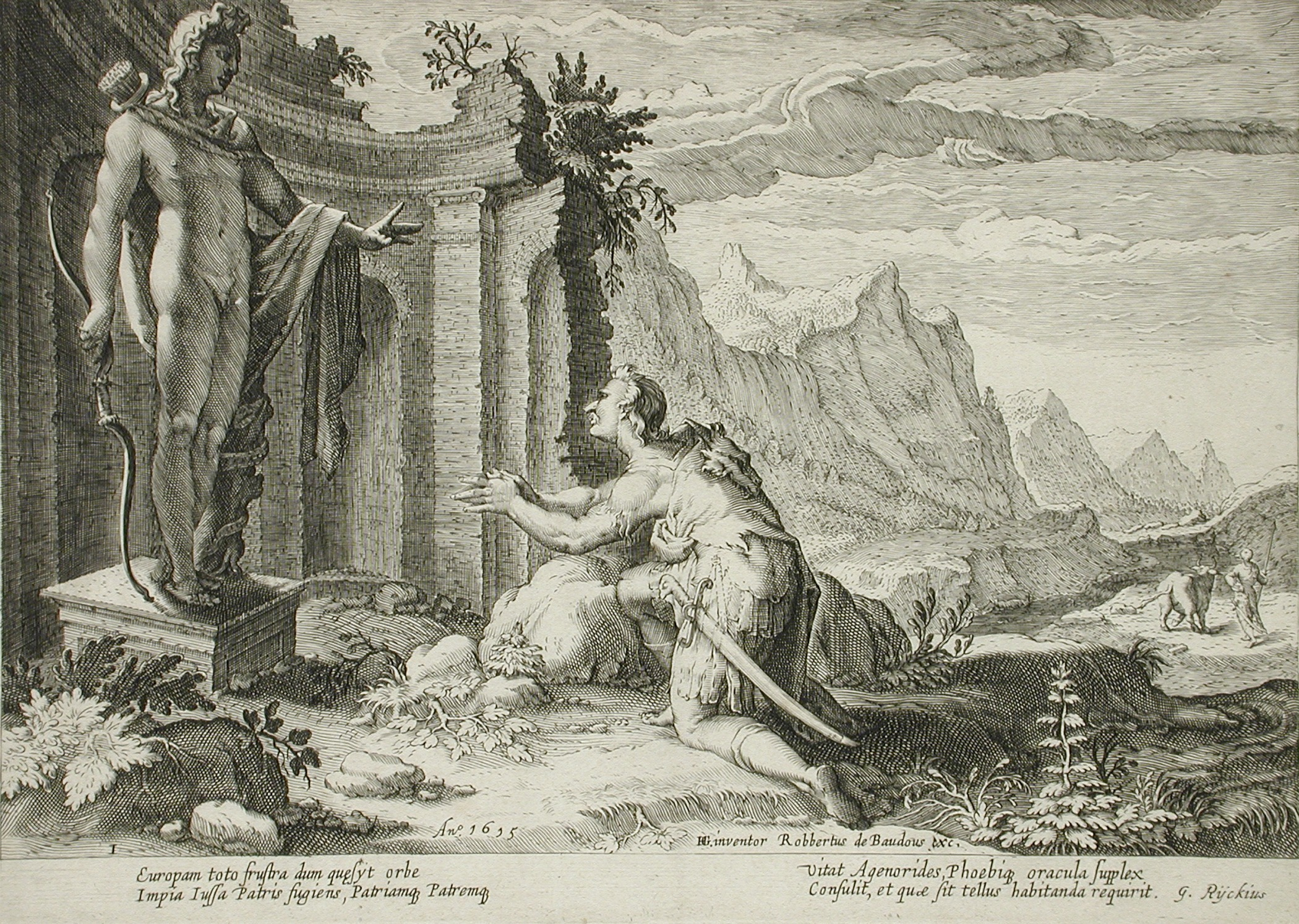
Cadmus Asks the Delphic Oracle Where He Can Find his Sister, Europa, Hendrick Goltzius

Cadmus came in the course of his wanderings to Delphi, where he consulted the oracle. He was ordered to give up his quest and follow a special cow, with a half moon on her flank, which would meet him, and to build a town on the spot where she should lie down exhausted.

The cow was given to Cadmus by Pelagon, King of Phocis, and it guided him to Boeotia, where he founded the city of Thebes.

Intending to sacrifice the cow to Athena, Cadmus sent some of his companions, Deioleon and Seriphus, to the nearby Ismenian spring for water. They were slain by the spring's guardian water-dragon (compare the Lernaean Hydra), which was in turn destroyed by Cadmus, the duty of a culture hero of the new order.

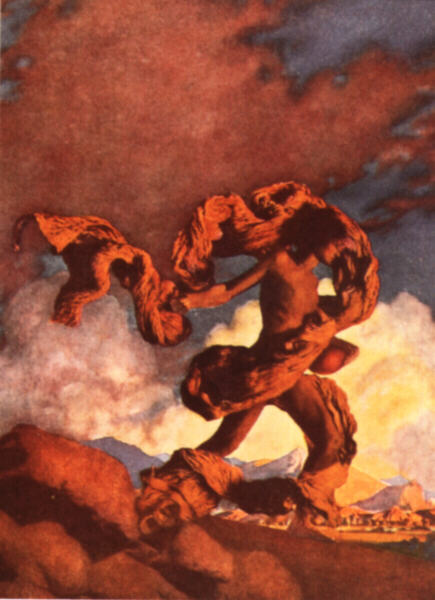
Cadmus Sowing the Dragon's Teeth, by Maxfield Parrish, 1908.

He was then instructed by Athena to sow the dragon's teeth in the ground, from which there sprang a race of fierce armed men, called the Spartoi ("sown"). By throwing a stone among them, Cadmus caused them to fall upon one another until only five survived, who assisted him to build the Cadmeia or citadel of Thebes, and became the founders of the noblest families of that city.

The dragon had been sacred to Ares, so the god made Cadmus do penance for eight years by serving him. According to Theban tellings, it was at the expiration of this period that the gods gave him Harmonia ("harmony", literally "putting or assembling together", "good assembly", or "good composition") as wife. At Thebes, Cadmus and Harmonia began a dynasty with two sons Polydorus and Illyrius, and four daughters, Agave, Autonoë, Ino and Semele. In rare accounts, the couple instead had six daughters who are called the Cadmiades: Ino, Agaue, Semele, Eurynome, Kleantho and Eurydike.

At the wedding, whether celebrated at Samothrace or at Thebes, all the gods were present; Harmonia received as bridal gifts a peplos worked by Athena and a necklace made by Hephaestus. This necklace, commonly referred to as the Necklace of Harmonia, brought misfortune to all who possessed it. Notwithstanding the divinely ordained nature of his marriage and his kingdom, Cadmus lived to regret both: his family was overtaken by grievous misfortunes, and his city by civil unrest. Cadmus finally abdicated in favor of his grandson Pentheus, and went with Harmonia to Illyria, to fight on the side of the Enchelii. Later, as king, he founded the city of Lychnidos and Bouthoe.

Nevertheless, Cadmus was deeply troubled by the ill-fortune which clung to him as a result of his having killed the sacred dragon, and one day he remarked that if the gods were so enamoured of the life of a serpent, he might as well wish that life for himself. Immediately, he began to grow scales and change in form. Harmonia, seeing the transformation, thereupon begged the gods to share her husband's fate, which they granted.

In another telling of the story, the bodies of Cadmus and his wife were changed after their deaths; the serpents watched their tomb while their souls were translated to the fields. In Euripides's The Bacchae, Cadmus is given a prophecy by Dionysus whereby both he and his wife will be turned into snakes for a period before eventually being brought to live among the blessed.

== Genealogy ==
Cadmus was of ultimately divine ancestry, the grandson of the sea god Poseidon and Libya on his father's side, and of Nilus (the River Nile) on his mother's side; overall he was considered a member of the fifth generation of beings following the (mythological) creation of the world:

Argive genealogy in Greek mythology

Oceanus	Tethys
Inachus	Melia
Zeus	Io	Phoroneus
Epaphus	Memphis
Libya	Poseidon
Achiroë	Belus	Agenor	Telephassa
Danaus	Elephantis	Aegyptus	Cadmus	Cilix	Europa	Phoenix
Mantineus	Hypermnestra	Lynceus	Harmonia	Zeus
Sparta	Lacedaemon	Ocalea	Abas	Polydorus	Agave	Sarpedon	Rhadamanthus
Eurydice	Acrisius	Autonoë	Ino	Minos
Zeus	Danaë	Semele	Zeus
Perseus	Dionysus

Colour key:

Male
Female
Deity

Royal House of Thebes
- Solid lines indicate descendants.
- Dashed lines indicate marriages.
- Dotted lines indicate extra-marital relationships or adoptions.
- Kings of Thebes are numbered with bold names and a light purple background.
  - Joint rules are indicated by a number and lowercase letter, for example, 5a. Amphion shared the throne with 5b. Zethus.
- Regents of Thebes are alphanumbered (format AN) with bold names and a light red background.
  - The number N refers to the regency preceding the reign of the N^{th} king. Generally this means the regent served the N^{th} king but not always, as Creon (A9) was serving as regent to Laodamas (the 10th King) when he was slain by Lycus II (the usurping 9th king).
  - The letter A refers to the regency sequence. "A" is the first regent, "B" is the second, etc.
- Deities have a yellow background color.

Harmonia	1. Cadmus	Polyxo	A4. Nycteus (Regent)	Dirce	B4 & A6. Lycus (Regent)
Zeus	Zeus
Ino	Agave	Echion	3. Polydorus	Nycteis	Antiope
Semele	Autonoë
Dionysus	2. Pentheus	Epeiros	4. Labdacus	5a. Amphion	5b. Zethus
Oclasus
Menoeceus
Eurydice	A7, A8 & A9. Creon (Regent)	Jocasta	6. Laius	Merope	Polybus
Hipponome	Alcaeus
Zeus
Alcmene	Amphitryon	Perimede	7. Oedipus
Megara	Heracles	Iphicles	Anaxo
Henioche	Megareus	Haemon	Antigone	8b. Eteocles	Argea	8a. Polynices
Pyrrha	Lycomedes	Ismene	9. Lycus II
A12. Peneleos (Regent)	10. Laodamas	Demonassa	11. Thersander
Opheltes	12. Tisamenus
14. Damasichthon	13. Autesion
15. Ptolemy	Theras	Argeia	Aristodemus
16. Xanthos	Eurysthenes	Procles

== Offspring ==
With Harmonia, he was the father of Semele, Polydorus, Autonoë, Agave and Ino. Their youngest son was Illyrius. According to Greek mythology, Cadmus is the ancestor of Illyrians and Theban royalty.

== Samothracian connection ==
The fact that Hermes was worshipped in Samothrace under the name of Cadmus or Cadmilus seems to show that the Theban Cadmus was interpreted as an ancestral Theban hero corresponding to the Samothracians. Another Samothracian connection for Cadmus is offered via his wife Harmonia, who is said by Diodorus Siculus to be daughter of Zeus and the Samothracian Electra, who was one of the seven Pleiades.

== Modern scholarship ==
=== Origins of Cadmus and his myth ===
The question of Cadmus's eastern origin have been debated for a long time in modern scholarship.

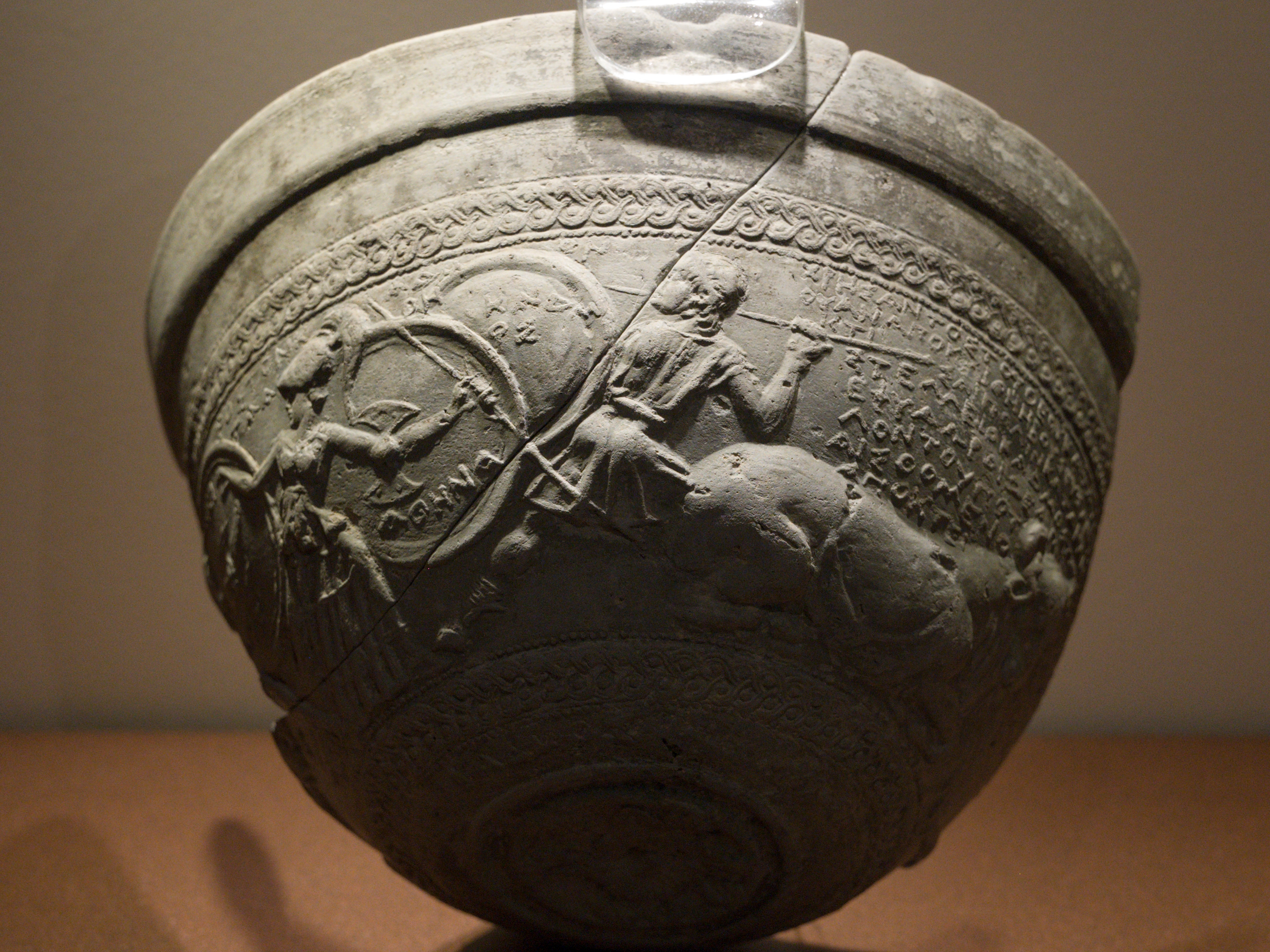
Ancient Greek second-century BC skyphos depicting the founding of Thebes by Cadmus, Archaeological Museum of Thebes.

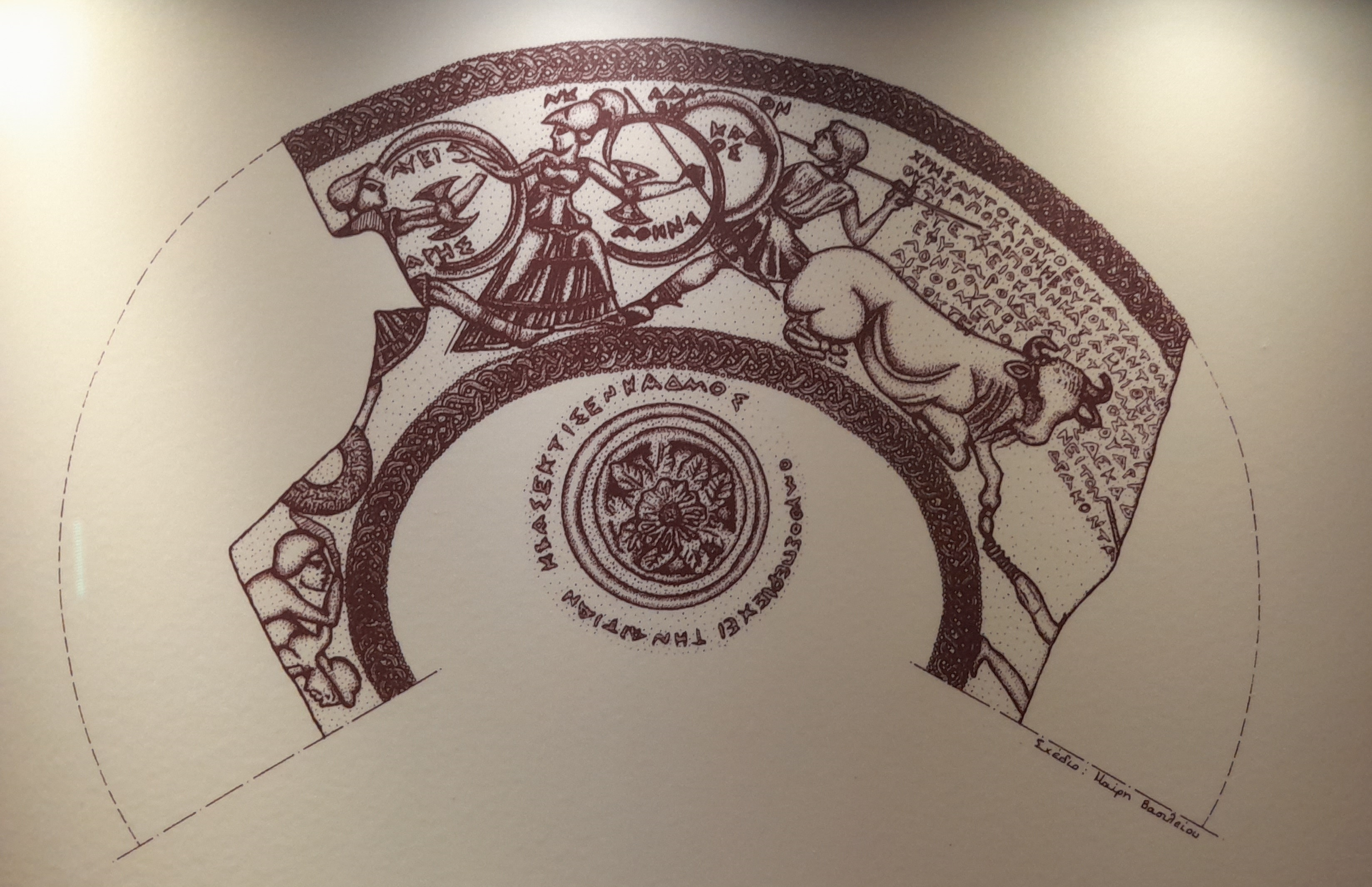
Illustration of the relief on the Cadmus skyphos; the Spartoi, Ares, Athena, Cadmus and the cow are shown.

Homer mentions Cadmus only once, but he had already referred to the inhabitants of Thebes with the name "Cadmeans". Aeschylus and Sophocles, in particular, repeatedly mention the "city of Cadmus" and "Cadmeans", relating Thebes with Cadmus. Also Euripides linked Thebes with Cadmus, but he was one of the earliest authors and the only tragedian to mention "Cadmus the Tyrian". Herodotus refers to Cadmus the Tyrian, and he was the first to mention Cadmus's 'Phoenician' origins, but he certainly was not the initiator of this transformation, as his Histories provides evidence that the myth was already widespread. Since Herodotus Cadmus has been commonly described as a prince of Phoenicia. According to Diodorus Siculus (1st century BC), Cadmus had Theban origins.

Modern historian Albert Schachter has suggested that Cadmus was a fictitious hero named after the Thebean acropolis and was made 'Phoenician' due to the influence of immigrants from the East to Boeotia. According to M. L. West the myth of Cadmus and Harmonia at Thebes originated from 9th or 8th century BC Phoenician residents in the city. According to Jason Colavito, although modern scholars have debated on whether the myth came from Phoenicia, there is evidence that the core of Cadmus's myth originated in Near Eastern stories of the battle between a hero and a dragon. The myth of Cadmus the Phoenician was not a literal reinterpretation of an original Phoenician myth, although being probably inspired by one, rather it was the Greeks' interpretation of the Phoenician civilization and the benefits they acquired from it, specifically the alphabet. According to archaeologist John Boardman, the "Phoenicians" who came with Cadmus, were not "Phoenicians", but rather Greeks who had lived in the Near East for a while and had returned to teach what they had learned there, including the alphabet.

Given the absence of a Phoenician colony in Thebes, several hypotheses arguing against Cadmus's eastern origin have been proposed by modern scholars:

Mycenaean hypothesis

According to historian Frederick M. Ahl, scholarly suggestions (Note: E.g. Martin P. Nilsson's)) that Cadmus was a Mycenaean must be taken into account against Cadmus's Phoenician origin, as for him it is becoming harder and harder to reconcile literary and archaeological evidence, not to mention epigraphical difficulties. Ahl rather suggest that "Cadmus was a Mycenaean, and the writing he brought to Thebes was Linear B, which may have been known to Greek-speaking peoples then or later as φοινικήια γράμματα."

Cretan hypothesis

Henry Hall set forth an hypothesis, arguing that Cadmus and the Cadmeians came from Crete. There are a number of difficulties involved in this hypothesis, however, notably the assertion that Mycenaean society resulted from the triumph of the Minoan civilization over the mainland one.

Argive hypothesis

Cadmus was used as an identification figure by the Argives, representing an intriguing example of mythical requisition in relation to the wars between Argos and Thebes. According to the Argive legend, Cadmus's father Agenor was descended from the Argive princess Io. In this light, Cadmus becomes an Argive and Thebes his "home away from home", which is connected with the emergence of hybrid identities during the period of the Great Colonization.

=== Hittite records controversy ===
It has been argued by various scholars that in a letter from the King of Ahhiyawa to the Hittite King, written in the Hittite language in c. 1250 BC, a specific Cadmus was mentioned as a forefather of the Ahhijawa people. The latter term most probably referred to the Mycenaean world (Achaeans), or at least to a part of it. Nevertheless, this reading about a supposed Cadmus as historical person is rejected by most scholars.

== Legacy ==
- The Syrian city of Al-Qadmus is named after Cadmus.
- E. Nesbit's 1901 novel The Wouldbegoods includes an episode in which the children protagonists sow what they believe are dragon's teeth, and the next day, "just like Cadmus," they find an encampment of soldiers there.
- The element cadmium is named after Cadmus.

== See also ==
- Cadmean victory
- Cadmean vixen
- Cadmium
- Cadmus of Miletus
- Theban kings in Greek mythology

== General and cited references ==
=== Primary sources ===
- Apollodorus, The Library, with an English Translation by Sir James George Frazer, F.B.A., F.R.S. in 2 Volumes, Cambridge, MA, Harvard University Press; London, William Heinemann Ltd. 1921. III, i, 1-v, 4. ISBN 0-674-99135-4. Online version at the Perseus Digital Library. Greek text available from the same website.
- Homer, The Odyssey with an English Translation by A.T. Murray, Ph.D. in two volumes. Cambridge, MA: Harvard University Press; London: William Heinemann, Ltd. 1919. 5.333. ISBN 978-0674995611. Online version at the Perseus Digital Library. Greek text available from the same website.
- Gaius Julius Hyginus, Fabulae from The Myths of Hyginus translated and edited by Mary Grant. University of Kansas Publications in Humanistic Studies. 178. Online version at the Topos Text Project.
- Publius Ovidius Naso, Metamorphoses, III, 1–137; IV, 563–603. Translated by Brookes More (1859–1942). Boston, Cornhill Publishing Co. 1922. Online version at the Perseus Digital Library.
- Publius Ovidius Naso, Metamorphoses. Hugo Magnus. Gotha (Germany). Friedr. Andr. Perthes. 1892. Latin text available at the Perseus Digital Library.

=== Secondary sources ===
- Ahl, F. M. (1967). "Cadmus and the Palm-Leaf Tablets". The American Journal of Philology. 88 (2): 188–194. doi:10.2307/293470. ISSN 0002-9475. JSTOR 293470.
- Colavito, Jason (2014). Jason and the Argonauts through the Ages. McFarland. ISBN 978-0-7864-7972-6.
- Harrison, Thomas (2019). Greeks And Barbarians. Edinburgh University Press. ISBN 978-1-4744-6891-6.
- Heinze, Theodor, "Cadmus (1)", in Brill's New Pauly: Encyclopaedia of the Ancient World. Antiquity, Volume 2, Ark – Cas, edited by Hubert Cancik and Helmuth Schneider, Leiden, Brill, 2003. ISBN 9004122656.
- Kerenyi, Karl. The Heroes of the Greeks, 1959.
- R. B. Edwards. Kadmos, the Phoenician: A Study in Greek Legends and the Mycenaean Age. Amsterdam, 1979.
- Matia Rocchi. Kadmos e Harmonia: un matrimonio problemmatico. Rome, Bretschneider, 1989.
- Shavit, Yaacov (2001). History in Black: African-Americans in Search of an Ancient Past. Taylor & Francis. ISBN 978-0-7146-8216-7.
- Schachter, A. (2012). "Cadmus". In Hornblower, Simon; Spawforth, Antony; Eidinow, Esther (eds.). The Oxford Classical Dictionary. OUP Oxford. p. 257. ISBN 978-0-19-954556-8.
- Schachter, Albert (2016). "Kadmos and the implications of the tradition for Boiotian history". Boiotia in Antiquity: Selected Papers. Cambridge: Cambridge University Press. pp. 25–35. ISBN 978-1-107-05324-3.
- Woodard, Roger D. (2013). "Alphabet". In Wilson, Nigel (ed.). Encyclopedia of Ancient Greece. Routledge. pp. 37–39. ISBN 9781136788000.

Regnal titles
New creation	Mythical King of Thebes	Succeeded by Pentheus
