= Bargasa =

City of ancient Caria

Coordinates: 37°01′19″N 27°46′26″E

Bargasa (Ancient Greek: Βάργασα) or Pargasa (Πάργασα) was a city of Ancient Caria. It was a polis (city-state) and a member of the Delian League. There are also coins of Bargasa with the epigraph Βαργασηνῶν. It is mentioned by Strabo, who, after speaking of Cnidus, says, "then Ceramus and Bargasa, small places above the sea."

Its site is located near Gökbel in Milas district, Asiatic Turkey.

It was said to have been named after Bargasus, son of Heracles.
