= Sostratus of Dyme =

Greek mythological hero

Sostratus (Ancient Greek: Σώστρατος) is a lover of the hero Heracles mentioned in Pausanias' Description of Greece.

According to Pausanias in his description of Dyme, he was from that ancient Achaean city and held in reverence by its inhabitants. He writes that on the side of a public road there was tomb of Sostratus, according to legend raised by Heracles in honour of his friend. Atop the mound was a slab with figure of Heracles in relief, where the Dymeans offered sacrifices.

Modern researchers and archaeology identified him with Polystratus, a hero of Dyme who assisted Heracles in the war against the Elean king Augeas and was killed there. Archaeological excavations uncovered a pillar identical to that described by Pausanias but with the name Polystratus on it.
