= Bargasus =

Mythical son of Heracles

Bargasus (Ancient Greek: Βάργασος) is a figure in ancient Greek mythology.

According to Apollonius of Aphrodisias, he was a son of Heracles and Barge. The town of Bargasa in Caria was said to have derived its name from him. He had been expelled by Lamus, the son of Omphale.
