= Polystratus =

Greek mythological character

In Greek mythology, Polystratus (Ancient Greek: Πολύστρατος) was a handsome youth beloved by Heracles.

== Mythology ==
Polystratus was solely known from an epigram uncovered in Dyme, Achaea, which is ascribed to Alcaeus of Messene: according to it, Polystratus accompanied Heracles in his campaign against the Molionidae and was killed in the battle, whereupon Heracles cut the hair off the top of his own head as a sign of grief. Polystratus is likely the same as Sostratus; there is a possibility that the name was altered because the youth was honored by the Dymaeans as savior of the city (σω- sō- being the Greek stem with the meaning "save").
