= Milk of Hera =

Greek mythological event

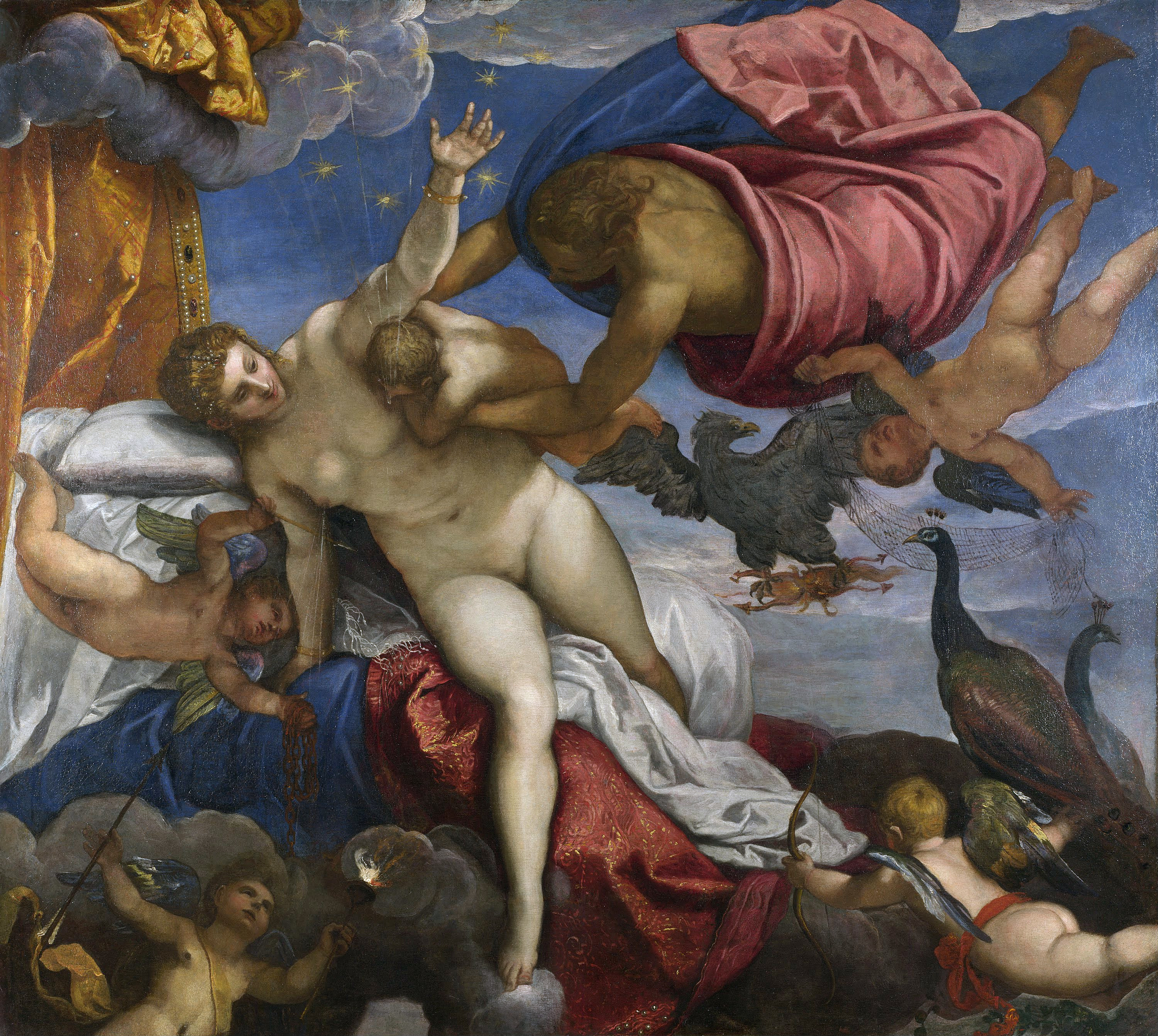
The Origin of the Milky Way by Jacopo Tintoretto.

The myth of the milk of Hera (Ancient Greek: Ἥρας γάλα, romanized: Hḗras gala) is an ancient Greek myth and not to be confused with actual breast milk, is the explanation of the origin of the Milky Way within the context of creation myths. The standard telling goes that the mythical hero Heracles, as an infant, breastfed from an unsuspecting Hera, the goddess of marriage and Zeus's wife, who threw him away, causing a little bit of her milk to splash and create the galaxy with all its stars.

== Etymology ==
The ancient Greek word for 'Milky Way' and 'galaxy' both is γαλαξίας, literally meaning "milky", derived from γάλα, which means milk, and is itself from the Proto-Indo-European root *glakt-, *galakt- (compare to the Latin lac).

== Mythology ==
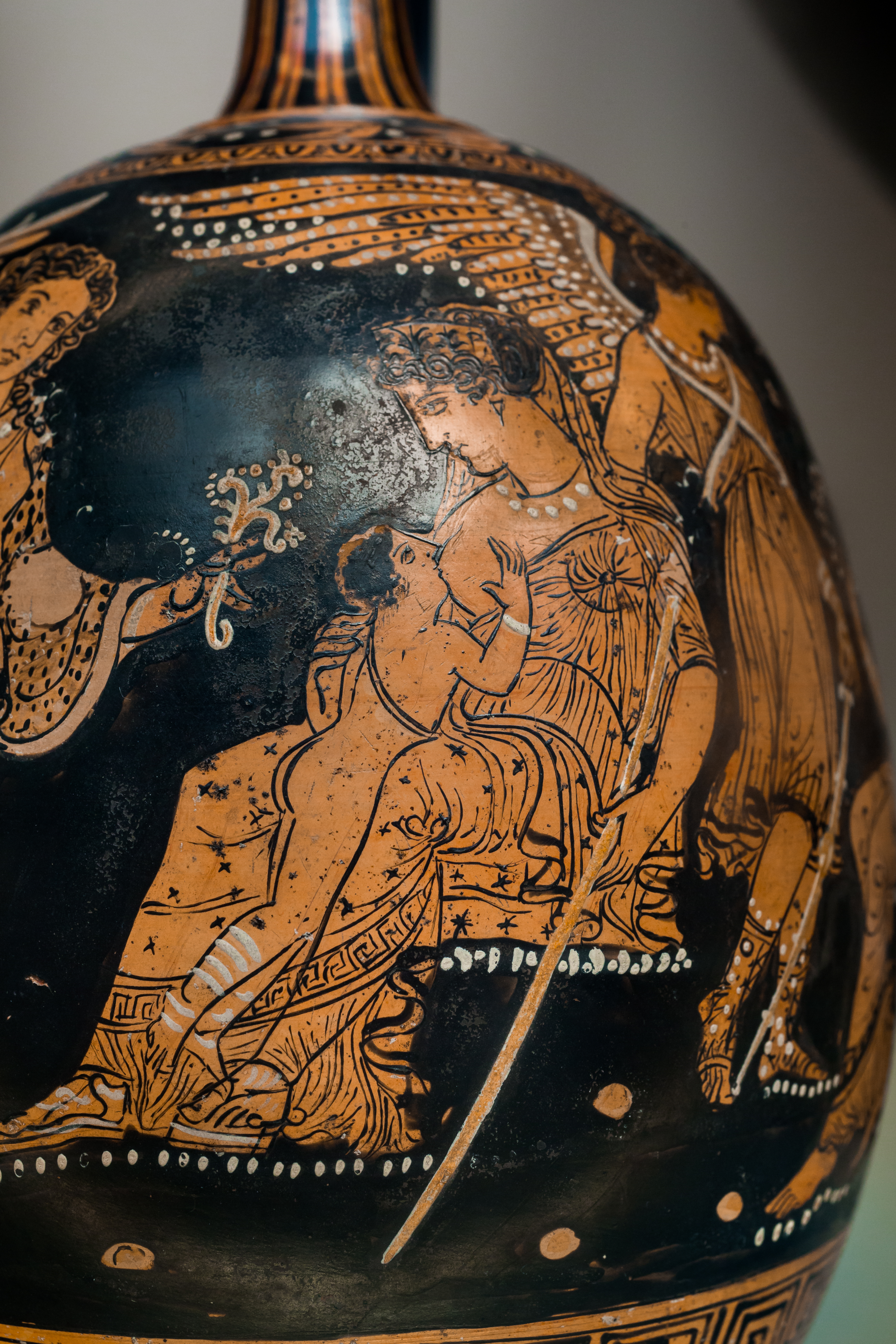
Detail of Hera suckling Heracles from an Apulian red-figure squat lekythos, ca. 360-350 BC

It was said that once Heracles had been born, either Zeus or his son Hermes took the infant and brought him to Hera, who was sleeping, and placed him to her breast so that he could suckle from her. Once Hera awoke and understood the situation, she pushed the baby away, and her unexpressed milk was sprayed. This story was attributed to (pseudo-)Eratosthenes.

In another telling, after Alcmene managed to bring forth both infants, she grew fearful of Hera's wrath and imminent retribution, so she exposed the infant in some field. The goddess Athena, Heracles' half-sister, found him and brought him to Hera, without revealing his identity. Hera, admiring the baby, offered to breastfeed him. But Heracles bit too hard on her breast, hurting her and forcing Hera to cast him aside in pain, as Athena returned him to his mortal parents.

A version that diverges significantly from the more known ones states that the milk was not Hera's at all. According to the Roman mythographer Hyginus, when Rhea presented a swaddled rock to her husband Cronus pretending to be the infant Zeus, Cronus asked her to nurse the child one last time before he ate it. Rhea complied and pressed her breast against the rock, releasing a bit of milk. Hyginus, while recounting the more traditional story by Eratosthenes, supplants the infant Heracles for the infant Hermes, the son of the nymph Maia, instead.

Both Eratosthenes and Hyginus link Heracles breastfeeding Hera to his legitimation as an infant, since the only way for a son of Zeus to be able to receive honours in heaven was through being nursed by Hera, with Hyginus providing an additional example with Hermes. Neither Diodorus nor Pausanias make such connection between the breastfeeding and Heracles suckling from his father's wife breast; Diodorus mentions another ritual, which included a mock labour with Hera acting as Alcmene, as the way Heracles was legitimized after his apotheosis.

Whatever the details and the circumstances of the myth, it was said that the divine milk that spilt and sprayed across the heavens became the Milky Way galaxy, known to the ancient Greeks as Galaxias Kyklos (Ancient Greek: Γαλαξίας Κύκλος, lit. 'the milky circle'). This rather dramatic myth has been depicted throughout history by many artists, including Tintoretto and Rubens.

In a lesser-known variant, some of the milk's portion that was released fell down on the earth, and transformed into a lily, a flower as white as Hera's milk.

== See also ==
- Milky Way (mythology)
- Heracles at the crossroads
- Five Suns
- Tyros

== Bibliography ==
- Anonymous (1805). Geoponika: Agricultural Pursuits. Vol. II. Translated by Thomas Owen. London.
- Ascherson, Ferdinand (1884). Berliner Studien für classische Philologie und Archaeologie. Berlin, Germany: Calvary.
- Beekes, R. S. P. (2009). Etymological Dictionary of Greek. Vol. 1. Leiden, the Netherlands: Brill Publications. ISBN 978-90-04-17420-7.
- Diodorus Siculus (1935). Library of History. Loeb Classical Library 303. Cambridge, MA. Vol. II: Books 2.35-4.58. Translated by by C. H. Oldfather. Harvard University Press.
- Hard, Robin (2015). Constellation Myths: With Aratus's 'Phaenomena'. Oxford University Press. ISBN 978-0-19-871698-3.
- Hyginus, Astronomica from The Myths of Hyginus translated and edited by Mary Grant. University of Kansas Publications in Humanistic Studies. Online version at the Topos Text Project.
- Liddell, Henry George; Scott, Robert (1940). A Greek-English Lexicon, revised and augmented throughout by Sir Henry Stuart Jones with the assistance of Roderick McKenzie. Oxford: Clarendon Press. Online version at Perseus.tufts project.
- Pausanias, Pausanias Description of Greece with an English Translation by W.H.S. Jones, Litt.D., and H.A. Ormerod, M.A., in 4 Volumes. Cambridge, MA, Harvard University Press; London, William Heinemann Ltd. 1918. Online version at the Perseus Digital Library.
- Pirenne-Delforge, Vinciane; Pironti, Gabriella (January 27, 2022). The Hera of Zeus. Cambridge, UK: Cambridge University Press. ISBN 978-1-108-84103-0.
- Waller, William H. (October 31, 2017). The Milky Way: An Insider's Guide. New Jersey, United States: Princeton University Press. ISBN 978-0-691-17835-6.
