= Alebion =

Ancient Greek mythological figure

In Greek mythology, Alebion (Ancient Greek: Ἀλεβίων) or Albion (Ἀλβίων) of Liguria, was a son of Poseidon and brother of Dercynus (also called Bergion or Ligys). In one source, Alebion was also known as Ialebion (Ἰαλεβίων).

== Mythology ==
Alebion attacked Heracles with Dercynus when he passed through their country, Liguria in North-Western Italy, on his way back to Mycenae from Iberia having obtained the Cattle of Geryon as his tenth labour. The battle that followed was fierce; Albion and Dercynus (or Bergion) were supported by a numerous army. Heracles and his army were in a difficult position so he prayed to his father Zeus for help. With the aegis of Zeus, Heracles won the battle, and both brothers were killed. It was this kneeling position of Heracles, when he prayed to his father Zeus, that gave the name Engonasin (Ἐγγόνασιν, derived from ἐν γόνασιν), meaning "on his knees" or "the Kneeler" to Hercules' constellation. The story is also alluded to in Hyginus, Dionysius and Strabo.

== See also ==
- Albion (Blake) – Primeval man in the mythology of William Blake
