= Leucaspis =

Sicani prince in Greek mythology

In Greek mythology, Leucaspis (Ancient Greek: Λεύκασπις) was a Sicani prince who entered into combat with Heracles when he passed through Sicily, on return from the country of Geryon.

In the combat Leucaspis died along with a great number of noble compatriots, and he became a cult.

In Book Six, line 334 of the Aeneid, Vergil mentions Leucaspis as one of the souls deprived of death rites and blocked from crossing the River Styx.
