= Dercynus =

Ancient Greek mythological figure

- Other names: Bergion, Beergios, Ligys
- Abode: Liguria, Italy

Genealogy
- Parents: Poseidon
- Siblings: Alebion

In Greek mythology, Dercynus (Ancient Greek: Δέρκυνος, romanized: Dérkynos) was a son of Poseidon and brother of Alebion (Ialebion). The two brothers engaged into battle with Heracles at Liguria of North-Western Italy. This version was mentioned in Aeschylus' play Promētheus Lyomenos, now lost. In some sources, Dercynus was named as Ligys (Λιγύς) and Bergion (Βεργίων, Bergíōn) or Beergios.

== Mythology ==
Having obtained the Cattle of Geryon as his tenth labour, Heracles was passing through Liguria, on his way back to Mycenae from Iberia. Dercynus and Albion were supported by a numerous army. The battle that followed was fierce. Hercules and his army were in a difficult position so he prayed to his father Zeus for help. With the aegis of Zeus, Heracles won the battle and both brothers were killed. It was this kneeling position of Heracles when prayed to his father Zeus that gave the name Engonasin ("Εγγόνασιν", derived from "εν γόνασιν"), meaning "on his knees" or "the Kneeler" to Hercules' constellation. The story is also alluded to in Hyginus, Dionysius and Strabo.

== Sources ==
- Apollodorus, The Library with an English Translation by Sir James George Frazer, F.B.A., F.R.S. in 2 Volumes, Cambridge, MA, Harvard University Press; London, William Heinemann Ltd. 1921. ISBN 0-674-99135-4. Online version at the Perseus Digital Library. Greek text available from the same website.
- Dionysus of Halicarnassus, Roman Antiquities. English translation by Earnest Cary in the Loeb Classical Library, 7 volumes. Harvard University Press, 1937–1950. Online version at Bill Thayer's Web Site
- Dionysius of Halicarnassus, Antiquitatum Romanarum quae supersunt, Vol I-IV. . Karl Jacoby. In Aedibus B.G. Teubneri. Leipzig. 1885. Greek text available at the Perseus Digital Library.
- Gaius Julius Hyginus, Astronomica from The Myths of Hyginus translated and edited by Mary Grant. University of Kansas Publications in Humanistic Studies. Online version at the Topos Text Project.
- Scholia to Lycophron's Alexandra, marginal notes by Isaak and Ioannis Tzetzes and others from the Greek edition of Eduard Scheer (Weidmann 1881). Online version at the Topos Text Project.. Greek text available on Archive.org
- Strabo, The Geography of Strabo. Edition by H.L. Jones. Cambridge, Mass.: Harvard University Press; London: William Heinemann, Ltd. 1924. Online version at the Perseus Digital Library.
- Strabo, Geographica edited by A. Meineke. Leipzig: Teubner. 1877. Greek text available at the Perseus Digital Library.
- Tzetzes, John, Histories or Chiliades unedited translation by Ana Untila (Book I), Gary Berkowitz (II-IV), Konstantinos Ramiotis (V-VI), Vasiliki Dogani (VII-VIII), Jonathan Alexander (IX-X), Muhammad Syarif Fadhlurrahman (XI), and Nikolaos Giallousis (XII-XIII), with translation adjustments by Brady Kiesling affecting about 15 percent of the total . These translations are based on the 1826 Greek edition of Theophilus Kiesslingius. Online version at the Topos Text Project.
