= Termerus =

Figure in Greek mythology

In Greek mythology, Termerus (Ancient Greek: Τέρμερος) was a bandit who was killed by Heracles.

== Mythology ==
The episode is referenced in Plutarch's Life of Theseus, in description of Theseus' method of slaying his assailants by returning "the same sort of violence that they offered to him," as Heracles killed Termerus by “breaking his skull in pieces". Hence, comes the proverb of 'a Termerian mischief'. It seems Termerus killed passengers that he met by running with his head against them.

According to Stephanus of Byzantium, Termerus was the eponym of the city Termera in Lycia. A scholiast on Euripides relates that Termera was founded by Termerus and took its name after him. The same source informs that Termerus and Lycus, two Lelegians "of beastly nature", were said to be notorious robbers that raided Caria and also sailed as far as the island Kos for the same purpose. The saying "Termerian mischief" was accordingly inspired by their deeds.

According to the dictionary Suda, the proverbial expression "Termerian mischief" (Ancient Greek: Τερμέρια κακά) was due to a fortified dungeon located in Caria near Mount Termerion lying between Myndus and Halicarnassus.
