= Tyrannus (mythology) =

Character in Greek mythology

In Greek mythology, Tyrannus (Ancient Greek: Τύραννος means 'an absolute ruler') was a Taphian prince a son of King Pterelaus and brother of Chromius, Chersidamas, Antiochus, Mestor, Everes and Comaetho. He was killed, along with most of his brothers, by the sons of Electryon.
