= Antiope (mother of Amphion) =

Greek mythological figure

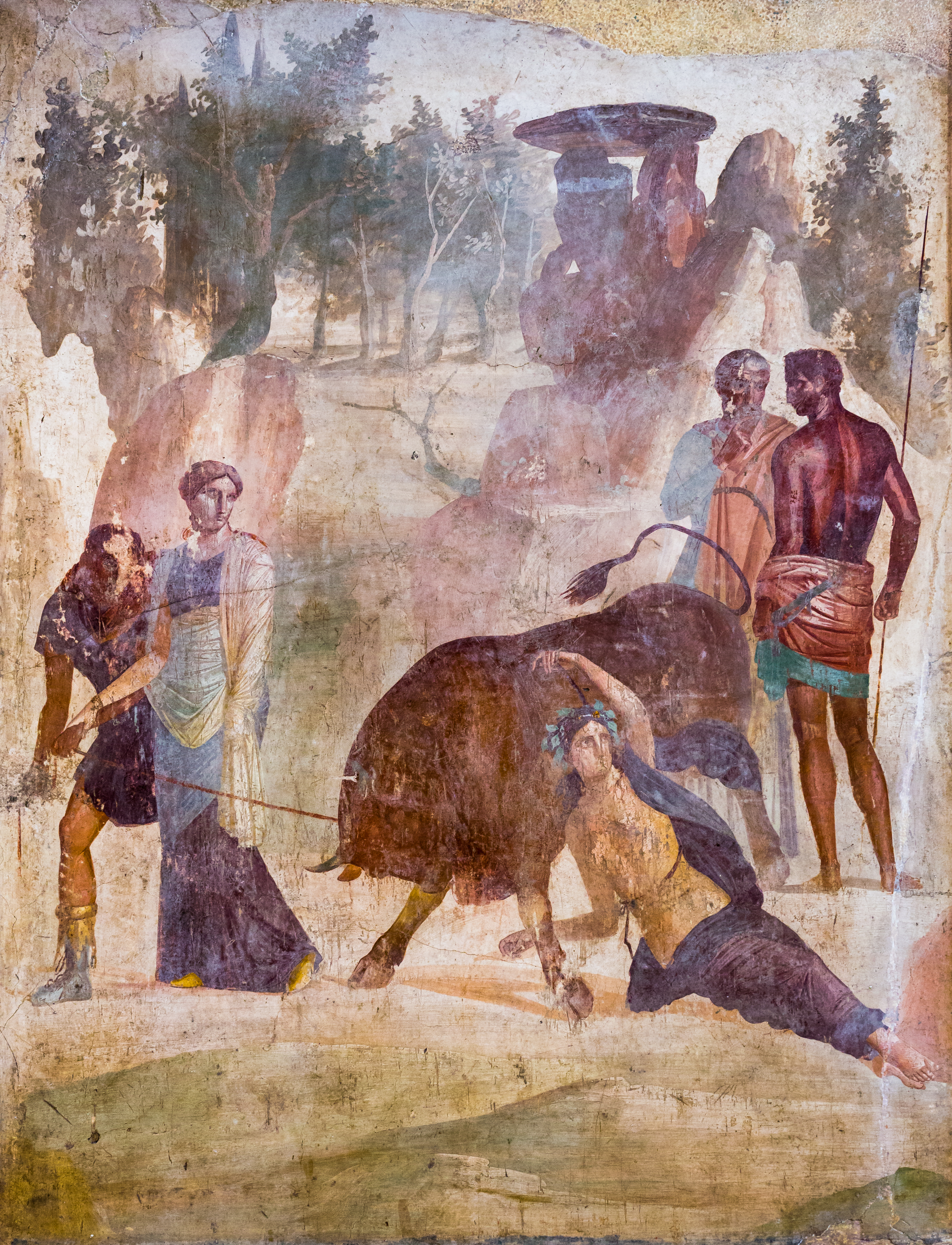
Antiope watches Amphion and Zethus bind Dirce to the horns of a wild bull in punishment for having mistreated her. Antique fresco from Pompeii.

In Greek and Roman mythology, Antiope (/ænˈtaɪəpi/; Ancient Greek: Ἀντιόπη, romanized: Antiópē) is the mother of the twin heroes Amphion and Zethus by Zeus the king of the gods. Although stated in early sources to be a daughter of the Boeotian river god Asopus, most authors made her a child of king Nycteus of Thebes. Her myth has many variations, but they all agree that Antiope is forced to expose her children after their birth and then spends many years being abused by her uncle and his wife before her sons save her.

Antiope's myth inspired a number of artists in both the classical and post-classical period. Her myth is best known from its adaptation by Athenian playwright Euripides in the now lost play Antiope, produced in the last quarter of the fifth century BC. During the Roman era, it was common for Zeus to be portrayed as having taken the form of a satyr to approach Antiope.

== Family ==
Usually Antiope is presented as the daughter of Nycteus by Polyxo, although in Homer and Apollonius Rhodius her father is Asopus, the river-god. She bore the twins Amphion and Zethus to Zeus. Through Nycteus she had two sisters, Polyxo and Nycteïs.

== Mythology ==
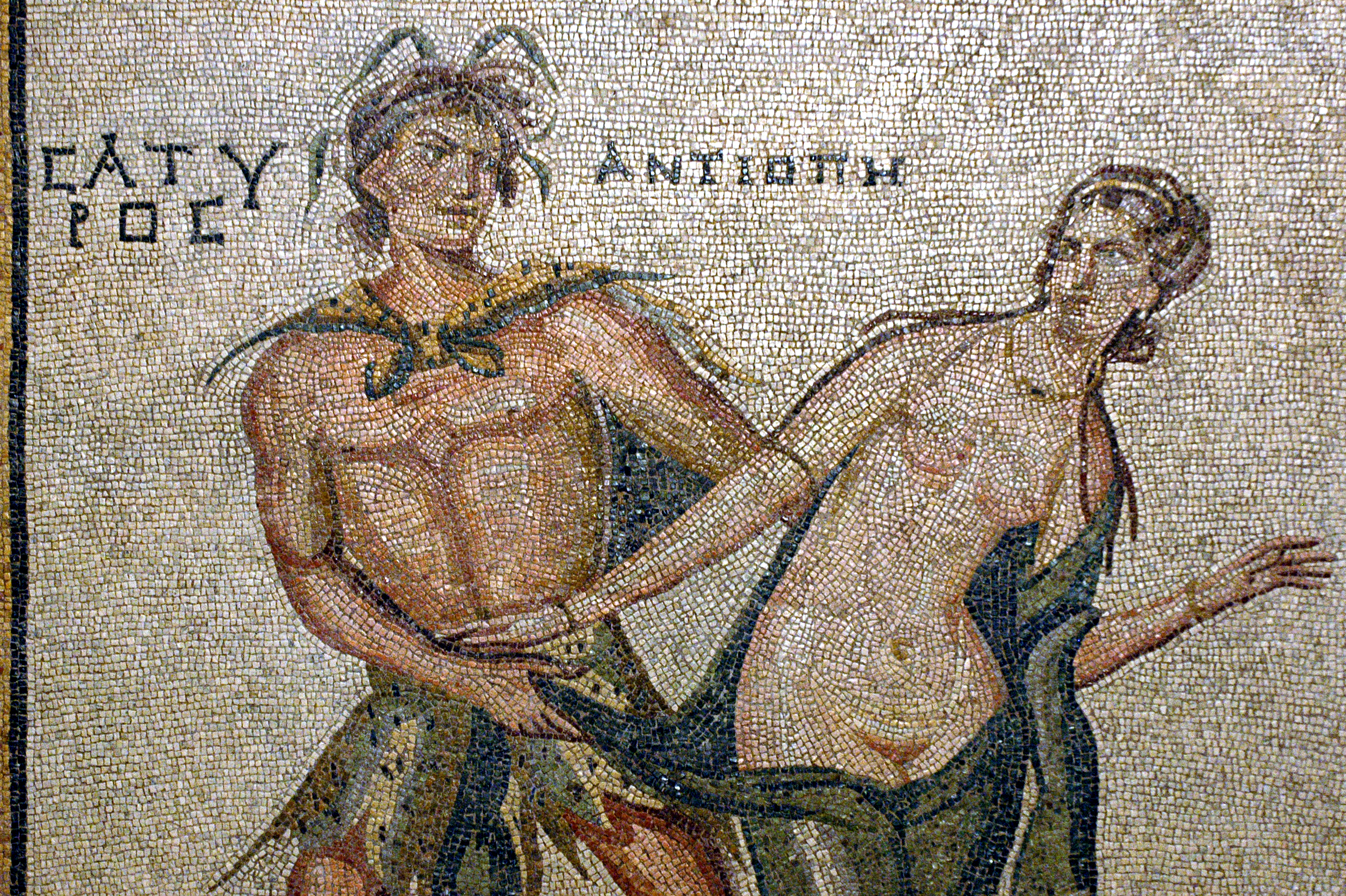
Roman mosaic with satyr-Zeus seducing Antiope from Zeugma.

=== Archaic period ===
The earliest mention of Antiope can be found in the archaic epic poem Odyssey, composed around the eighth or seventh century BC. In it, she is described by Homer as a daughter of the river-god Asopus who is proud for having laid with Zeus and borne his sons, Amphion and Zethus, the heroes who founded seven-gated Thebes.

Another entry of the Epic Cycle, the now lost Cypria, apparently referenced Antiope with the story of how Epopeus was ruined for seducing the daughter of Lycus (or Lycurgus depending on manuscript). Other traditions make Antiope the daughter of Nycteus, brother to Lycus and regent of Thebes, which was founded by Cadmus. It is unclear what lineage was known to Hesiod; the accomplishments of Amphion and Zethus are mentioned in the Catalogue of Women, and so it probably discussed their mother's ancenstry, but it is impossible to determine which version that work utilised from the surviving fragments.

=== Euripides ===
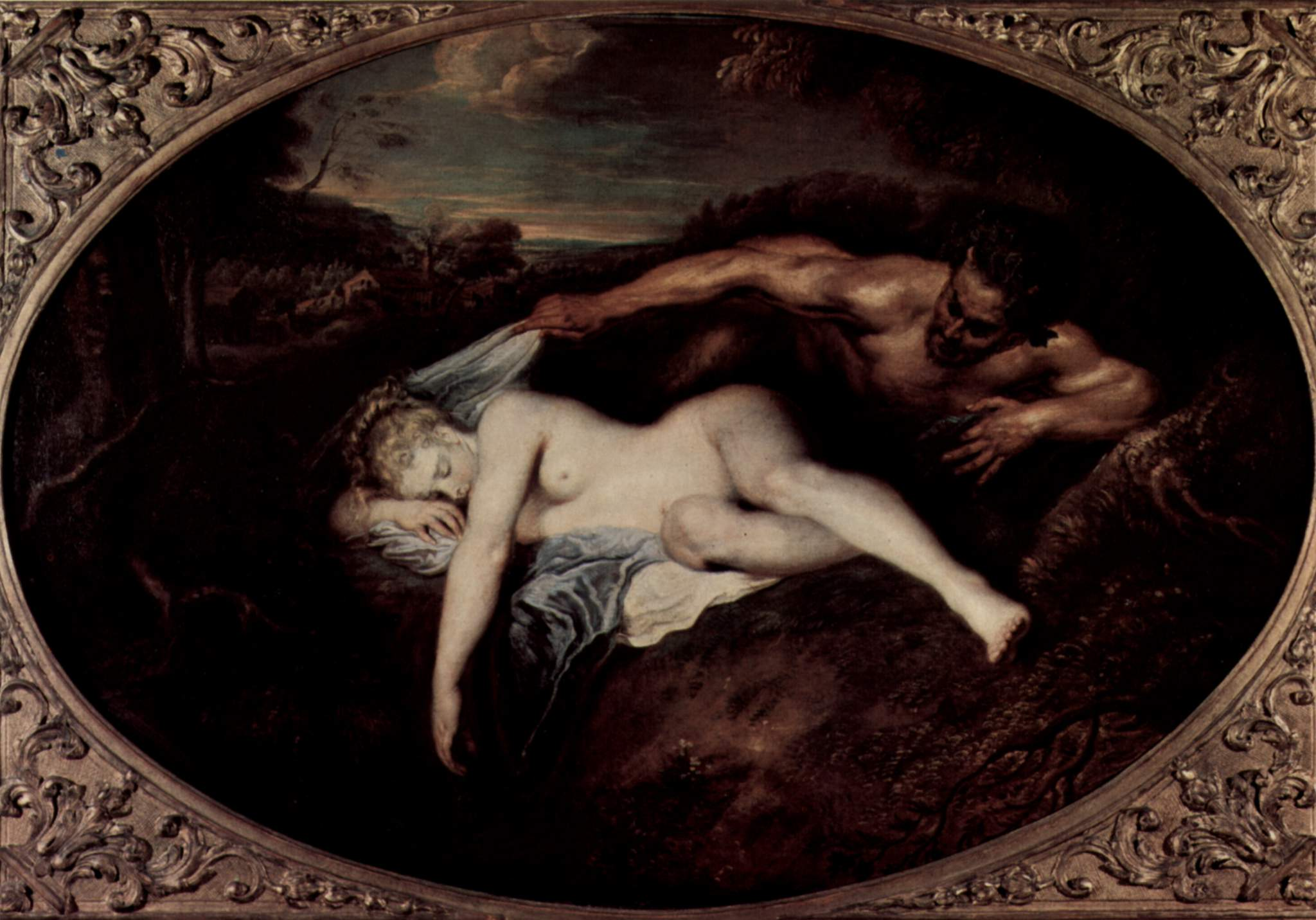
Jupiter and Antiope, by Antoine Watteau (c. 1714–1719).

The fullest and most influential account of the myth is found in Athenian playwright Euripides' dramatization of the story, the now lost play Antiope, of which many fragments and a summary are preserved. It was produced in the late 400s BC, with both 420s and 409 BC proposed as the original producation dates.

According to the play, Antiope fell pregnant when Zeus visited her bed 'as a bad man'. Fearing her father's reaction she fled to Sicyon, where she was given shelter by king Epopeus, whom she also married. Nycteus was enraged, and before dying, he tasked his brother Lycus to punish Antiope. Lycus went to Sicyon, and after killing Epopeus, he dragged Antiope back to Thebes, who gave birth to twin boys in Eleutherae near Cithaeron. She exposed her infants, but a kindly herdsman found and raised them. He called them Amphion and Zethus, due to their mother giving birth to them on the road (amphodon) and asking for an easy labour (ezetese).

Back in Thebes Lycus assumed the vacant regency, while he and his cruel wife Dirce abused Antiope and treated her as a slave. Eventually after many years of torment she found a chance at escape and made a run for it, reaching Eleutherae and finding there her grown-up sons, Amphion a talented singer and musician, Zethus a hard-working herdsman. Euripides contrasted their active and contemplative lives via a debate between the two, with Zethus advocating for hard work and berating his brother for his love of music and pleasure while Amphion defended his love for the arts. Unlike her however her sons did not recognise her, and did not believe her when she claimed to be their mother with Zeus as the father. Suspecting Antiope of being an escaped slave, they refused to shelter her.

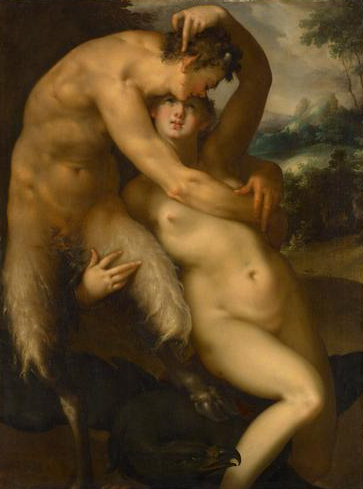
Jupiter and Antiope, by Bartholomeus Spranger.

Dirce soon arrived to attend the worship of Dionysus, being a Bacchant. She spotted and recognised the runaway Antiope, and dragged her away to put her to death, possibly with the help of her female attendants (the secondary chorus in the play). The boys' foster father arrived then and revealed to Amphion and Zethus their true parentage. The twins then rescued Antiope and tied Dirce to a wild bull with the intention of letting the animal loose to wreak havoc and kill her in the process; then, as planned, the bull dragged the queen to her demise as punishment for Dirce's cruel treatment of their mother all those years and her attempt to murder Antiope.

They were about to kill Lycus as well when he too joined them on Cithaeron, but Hermes intervened and convinced them to spare Lycus, who then left the throne of Thebes to them both. Hermes also instructed them to build the fortifications of the city using Amphion's lyre and music, which magically prompted the building stones to put themselves in place.

=== Late authors ===
In later authors starting in the Roman era, Zeus was commonly portrayed as taking the form of a satyr to seduce or rape Antiope. Arthur Bernard Cook commented that the portrayal of him as a satyr, and Antiope as a Maenad, gave the story a Dionysian flavour.

Nycteus' death also varies; in some versions he kills himself out of shame of Antiope's disgrace, while in others he is the one to lead the initial campaign against Sicyon, only to be mortally wounded so he transfers regency and responsibility to punish Antiope and Epopeus over to his brother Lycus.

Nicolaus of Damascus meanwhile places the events of the story during Laius' reign; Antiope, kept as a slave by Dirce, approached her sons in court and begged them to save her. Amphion and Zethus killed Lycus and stoned Dirce to death, but Laius allowed them to have Lycus' house as reparations for they were Antiope had been treated.

==== The Sicyonian version ====
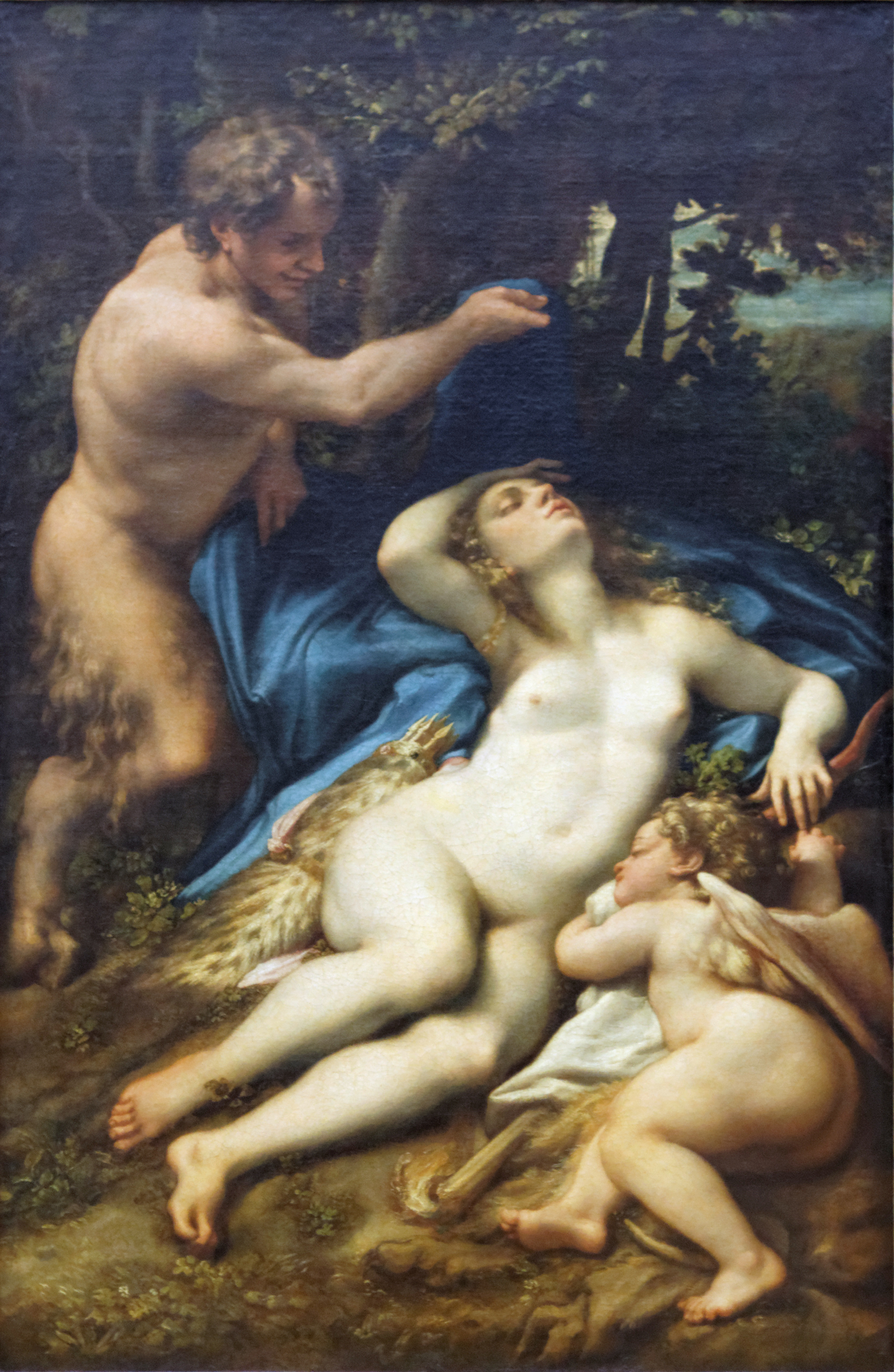
Terrestrial Venus, (Note: The sleeping nude, from the ducal gallery at Mantua, was not identified as Antiope before the 18th century; the painting is discussed by Lauren K. Soth who remarks that a sleeping Antiope would be an innovation with ancient or Renaissance precedent and reidentifies the subject as Terrestrial Venus; Marcin Fabiański carries the analysis further.) traditionally called Jupiter and Antiope, by Correggio (c. 1528).

As evidenced by the Cypria fragment, an important element of Antiope's story is her relation with the king of Sicyon. Attestations of the Sicyonian version is only preserved in late authors such as second-century traveller Pausanias, who are nevertheless following older traditions. The Archaic poet Asius of Samos (following apparently the Sicyonian tradition) probably presented Epopeus and Antiope's relationship in a positive manner, more akin to seduction and elopement than abduction and rape; nevertheless Nycteus waged a war against Sicyon in order to fetch his daughter back, and after being killed Lycus picked up from where his brother left off. His job was easy because as Pausanias relates Epopeus died of his wounds and his successor handed Antiope over to Lycus with no fuss.

Asius likely placed Antiope's impregnation by Zeus after her marriage to Epopeus and might have included the element of heteropaternal superfecundation (meaning that one twin was fathered by Zeus and the other by Epopeus), in analogy with the pregnancies of Alcmene, Leda and Chione. It is not clear which twin was Zeus', though hints point to Amphion. Her relation with him is not always positive however; Pausanias wrote that Epopeus kidnapped Antiope, although Nycteus' reaction might indicate Antiope colluded in her abduction. Epopeus can be seen as an embodiment of Zeus himself; his name means 'he who sees all', and it was used as one of Zeus' own cult epithets.

Hyginus records a version in which Epaphus the son of Io (probably a misspelling of Epopeus) raped Antiope so her husband-uncle Lycus kicked her out, and it was then that she was impregnated by Zeus. Lycus' new wife Dirce threw Antiope into a prison cell out of jealousy, but by Zeus' will her chains came undone, allowing Antiope to give birth to her sons away from Thebes. The story then proceeded as standard. The two Vatican Mythographers also recounted this version with Epaphus.

=== Later life ===
In some traditions, Dionysus inflicted madness upon Antiope for Dirce's murder, as the queen had been a devoted worshipper to the god. Antiope wandered restlessly all around Greece until she chanced upon Phocus on Mount Parnassus, who cured her and married her. They were buried together in the same tomb when they died. When the travelling king of Ithaca Odysseus descended into the Underworld and offered a sacrifice to the dead, summoning thus the souls of dead queens and princesses, Antiope was one of the several who appeared and chronicled their lives and deeds to him after he asked them questions.

Antiope's line did not get to keep the rulership of Thebes in the long run. Zethus married Aëdon, who accidentally killed their only child Itylus in a failed attempt to harm Amphion's wife Niobe by killing her eldest son Amaleus. Amphion and Niobe's twelve or fourteen children were shot dead by Apollo and Artemis after their mother bragged of being a more accomplished mother than Leto. After the deaths of the heirless Amphion and Zethus, the throne passed to Laius, whom Nycteus had been regent for.

== In Greek culture ==
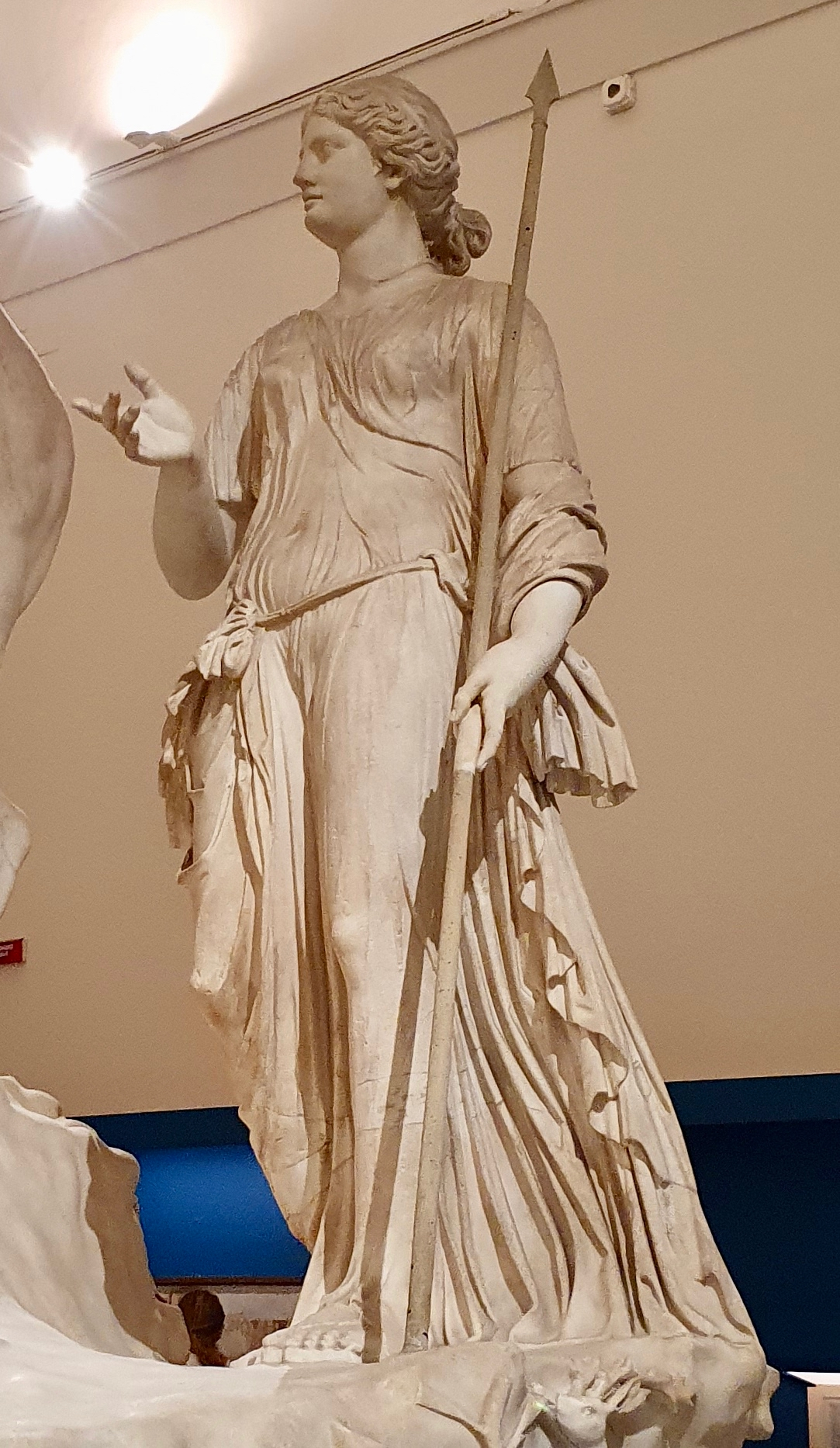
Antiope from the Farnese Bull statuary complex, Roman period

Antiope is an exceptional example of a woman suffering extended punishment for promiscuity, linked sexually to three different men, but also for her proximity to people who commit some crime (her sons killing Dirce).

At Sicyon, Antiope was important enough that a chryselephantine cult image was created of her and set up in the temple of Aphrodite. Pausanias speaks of it. Only one priestess, an elderly woman, was permitted to enter the cella of the temple, with a young girl chosen each year, to serve as Lutrophoros.

Euripides' Antiope, presented about 408 BCE, was widely quoted, in Plato's Gorgias and many other authors, resulting in a large array of fragments. In 1890 Flinders Petrie discovered further papyrus fragments, which had been reused in constructing a 3rd-century BCE Ptolemaic mummy case found in the Fayoum; the palaeography suggested that the scroll was old before it was reused as waste, making these fragments the earliest surviving text of any Greek play; the discovery occasioned a rash of new readings of the existing fragments. The modern comprehensive reconstruction of all the fragments is that of Jean Kambitsis, ed. and commentator, L'Antiope d'Euripide (Athens, 1972).

== Parallels ==
Burkert notices similarities between the myth of Antiope and her sons and the Athenian myth of Athena Polias and Erechtheus.

Antiope's twin sons were Amphion, son of Zeus, and Zethus, son of the mortal Epopeus. Another pair of twins with dual parentage are the Dioscuri, who often appear as snakes, protecting temples.

Dionysos, to whose worship Antiope was devoted, visited her with madness, causing her to wander restlessly all over Greece until she was cured. This myth is similar to that of Io, a priestess of the goddess Hera in Argos who was stung by a gadfly and wandered in madness to Egypt. Io's sons Cadmus and Danaos returned to Greece, where they became kings of Thebes and Argos respectively.

The trope of a city founded by royal twins also appears in the myth of Romulus and Remus, who founded Rome.

== Genealogy ==
Royal House of Thebes
- Solid lines indicate descendants.
- Dashed lines indicate marriages.
- Dotted lines indicate extra-marital relationships or adoptions.
- Kings of Thebes are numbered with bold names and a light purple background.
  - Joint rules are indicated by a number and lowercase letter, for example, 5a. Amphion shared the throne with 5b. Zethus.
- Regents of Thebes are alphanumbered (format AN) with bold names and a light red background.
  - The number N refers to the regency preceding the reign of the N^{th} king. Generally this means the regent served the N^{th} king but not always, as Creon (A9) was serving as regent to Laodamas (the 10th King) when he was slain by Lycus II (the usurping 9th king).
  - The letter A refers to the regency sequence. "A" is the first regent, "B" is the second, etc.
- Deities have a yellow background color.

Harmonia	1. Cadmus	Polyxo	A4. Nycteus (Regent)	Dirce	B4 & A6. Lycus (Regent)
Zeus	Zeus
Ino	Agave	Echion	3. Polydorus	Nycteis	Antiope
Semele	Autonoë
Dionysus	2. Pentheus	Epeiros	4. Labdacus	5a. Amphion	5b. Zethus
Oclasus
Menoeceus
Eurydice	A7, A8 & A9. Creon (Regent)	Jocasta	6. Laius	Merope	Polybus
Hipponome	Alcaeus
Zeus
Alcmene	Amphitryon	Perimede	7. Oedipus
Megara	Heracles	Iphicles	Anaxo
Henioche	Megareus	Haemon	Antigone	8b. Eteocles	Argea	8a. Polynices
Pyrrha	Lycomedes	Ismene	9. Lycus II
A12. Peneleos (Regent)	10. Laodamas	Demonassa	11. Thersander
Opheltes	12. Tisamenus
14. Damasichthon	13. Autesion
15. Ptolemy	Theras	Argeia	Aristodemus
16. Xanthos	Eurysthenes	Procles

== See also ==
- List of rape victims from ancient history and mythology
- Tyro
- Alope
- Chione

== Bibliography ==
- Apollodorus, Apollodorus, The Library, with an English Translation by Sir James George Frazer, F.B.A., F.R.S. in 2 Volumes. Cambridge, MA, Harvard University Press; London, William Heinemann Ltd. 1921. Online version at the Perseus Digital Library.
- Avery, Catherine B., ed. (1962). New Century Classical Handbook. New York, US: Appleton-Century-Crofts.
- Bell, Robert E. (1991). Women of Classical Mythology: A Biographical Dictionary. ABC-Clio. ISBN 9780874365818.
- Cook, Arthur Bernard (1914). Zeus: A Study in Ancient Religion. Vol. I: Zeus God of the Bright Sky. Cambridge University Press.
- Euripides, Antiope in Fragments: Aegeus-Meleager, edited and translated by Christopher Collard, Martin Cropp. Loeb Classical Library 504. Cambridge, MA: Harvard University Press, 2008. Loeb Classical Library.
- Evelyn-White, Hugh G., Hesiod, the Homeric Hymns, and Homerica, with an English Translation, Cambridge, MA., Harvard University Press; London, William Heinemann Ltd. 1914.
- Fowler, Robert L. (2000). Early Greek Mythography. Vol. 2: Commentary. Oxford, UK: Oxford University Press. ISBN 978-0-19-814741-1.
- Fragmenta Historicorum Græcorum, volume III, edited by Karl Otfried Müller. 1849 Google books.
- Gantz, Timothy (1993). Early Greek Myth: A Guide to Literary and Artistic Sources. Vol. I. Johns Hopkins University Press. ISBN 978-0-8018-5360-9.
- Gibert, John (2009). "Euripides' Antiope and the Quiet Life". In Cousland, J. Robert C.; Hume, James Rutherford (eds.). The Play of Texts and Fragments: Essays in Honour of Martin Cropp. BRILL. ISBN 978-90-04-17473-3.
- Grant, Michael; Hazel, John (August 2, 2004). Who's Who in Classical Mythology. London and New York: Routledge. ISBN 0-415-26041-8.
- Graves, Robert (1955). The Greek Myths. Vol. I (3rd 1960 ed.). London: Penguin. ISBN 978-0140010268.
- Grimal, Pierre (1987). The Dictionary of Classical Mythology. Wiley-Blackwell. ISBN 0-631-13209-0.
- Hard, Robin (2004). The Routledge Handbook of Greek Mythology: Based on H.J. Rose's "Handbook of Greek Mythology". Routledge. ISBN 9780415186360.
- Harder, Ruth Elisabeth (October 1, 2006). "Antiope". In Cancik, Hubert; Schneider, Helmuth (eds.). Brill's New Pauly. Translated by Christine F. Salazar. Zurich: Brill Reference Online. ISSN 1574-9347.
- Homer; The Odyssey with an English Translation by A.T. Murray, PH.D. in two volumes. Cambridge, MA., Harvard University Press; London, William Heinemann, Ltd. 1919. Online version at the Perseus Digital Library.
- Hyginus, Gaius Julius, The Myths of Hyginus. Edited and translated by Mary A. Grant, Lawrence: University of Kansas Press, 1960.
- Levaniouk, Olga (2011). "12: Aëdon". Eve of the Festival: Making Myth in Odyssey 19. Hellenic Studies Series 46. Washington, DC: Center for Hellenic Studies.
- Lucian, Dialogues of the Gods in Lucian's Dialogues, with an English translation by Howard Williams, M.A., George Bell & Sons. 1888. Archive.
- Merkelbach, Reinhold; West, Martin Litchfield (1967). Fragmenta Hesiodea. Oxford University Press.
- Nonnus, Dionysiaca; translated by Rouse, W H D, II Books XVI-XXXV. Loeb Classical Library No. 345, Cambridge, Massachusetts, Harvard University Press; London, William Heinemann Ltd. 1940. Internet Archive
- Ovid, Metamorphoses, with an English prose translation by A. S. Kline, 2000. Text available online at Poetry in Translation.
- Pausanias, Description of Greece with an English Translation by W.H.S. Jones, Litt.D., and H.A. Ormerod, M.A., in 4 Volumes. Cambridge, MA, Harvard University Press; London, William Heinemann Ltd. 1918. Online version at the Perseus Digital Library.
- Pepin, Ronald E. (2008). The Vatican Mythographers. New York City: Fordham University Press. ISBN 978-0-8232-2892-8.
- Proclus, The Epic Cycle, with an English translation by Gregory Nagy, Ed.
- Smith, William (1873). A Dictionary of Greek and Roman Biography and Mythology. London, UK: John Murray, printed by Spottiswoode and Co. Online version at the Perseus.tufts library.
- Tripp, Edward (June 1970). Crowell's Handbook of Classical Mythology (1st ed.). Thomas Y. Crowell Co. ISBN 069022608X.
- Tsagalis, Christos (2017). Early Greek Epic Fragments I: Antiquarian and Genealogical Epic. Berlin/Boston: De Gruytet. ISBN 978-3-11-053153-4.
