= Archelaus (mythology) =

In Greek mythology, Archelaus (Ancient Greek: Ἀρχέλαος means "leading the people, chief") may refer to the following personages:

- Archelaus, an Egyptian prince as one of the 50 sons of King Aegyptus. His mother was a Phoenician woman and thus full brother of Agaptolemus, Cercetes, Eurydamas, Argius, Aegius and Menemachus. In some accounts, he could be a son of Aegyptus either by Eurryroe, daughter of the river-god Nilus, or Isaie, daughter of King Agenor of Tyre. Archelaus suffered the same fate as his other brothers, save Lynceus, when they were slain on their wedding night by their wives who obeyed the command of their father King Danaus of Libya. He married the Danaid Anaxibia, daughter of Danaus and an Ethiopian woman.
- Archelaus, a Mycenaean prince as son of King Electryon and Anaxo, daughter of Alcaeus. He was the brother of Stratobates, Gorgophonus, Phylonomus, Celaeneus, Amphimachus, Lysinomus, Chirimachus, Anactor and Alcmena, mother of the hero Heracles. Together with his brothers, Archelaus was killed by the sons of the Taphian king, Pterelaus who claimed the kingdom of their ancestor Mestor, son of Perseus and brother of Electryon.
- Archelaus, son of the hero Heracles.
- Archelaus, son of Temenus.
- Archelaus, see Echelas.
