= Chersidamas =

Character in Greek mythology

In Greek mythology, Chersidamas (Ancient Greek: Χερσιδάμας) may refer to two different characters:

- Chersidamas, a Taphian prince a son of King Pterelaus and brother of Chromius, Tyrannus, Antiochus, Mestor, Everes and Comaetho. He was killed, along with most of his brothers, by the sons of Electryon.
- Chersidamas, a Trojan prince as one of the sons of King Priam of Troy by an unknown woman. He was killed by the hero Odysseus during the Trojan War.
