= Amphitryon (disambiguation) =

Amphitryon is a character of Greek mythology.

Amphitryon may also refer to:

- a host or entertainer
- Amphitryon (film), a 1935 German musical film
- Amphitryon (Plautus play), a Latin play by Plautus from ca. 190–185 B.C.
- Amphitryon (Molière play), a French comedy after Plautus from 1668
- Amphitryon (Dryden play), a 1691 English comedy after Plautus and Molière
- Amphitryon (Kleist), a German play after Molière and Plautus from 1807
- Amphitryon 38, a 1929 play by Jean Giraudoux
