= Stratobates =

In Greek mythology, Stratobates (Ancient Greek: Στρατοβάτην) was a Mycenaean prince as son of King Electryon and Anaxo, daughter of Alcaeus. He was the brother of Gorgophonus, Phylonomus, Celaeneus, Amphimachus, Lysinomus, Chirimachus, Anactor, Archelaus and Alcmena, mother of the hero Heracles.

== Mythology ==
Together with his brothers, Stratobates was killed by the sons of the Taphian king, Pterelaus who claimed the kingdom of their ancestor Mestor, son of Perseus and brother of Electryon.
