= Gorgophonus =

Son of Electryon in Greek mythology

In Greek mythology, Gorgophonus (Ancient Greek: Γοργοφόνον means 'Gorgon-killing') was a Mycenaean prince as son of King Electryon and Anaxo, daughter of Alcaeus. He was the brother of Stratobates, Phylonomus, Celaeneus, Amphimachus, Lysinomus, Chirimachus, Anactor, Archelaus and Alcmena, mother of the hero Heracles.

== Mythology ==
Together with his brothers, Gorgophonus was killed by the sons of the Taphian king, Pterelaus who claimed the kingdom of their ancestor Mestor, son of Perseus and brother of Electryon.
