= Celaeneus =

Son of Electryon in Greek mythology

In Greek mythology, Celaeneus or Kelaineus (Ancient Greek: Κελαινεύς, romanized: Kelainéus) was a Mycenaean prince as son of King Electryon. His name was derived from the root kelainós, which means "black," "dark," or "murky".

== Family ==
Celaeneus' mother was Anaxo, daughter of Alcaeus. His brothers were Stratobates, Gorgophonus, Phylonomus, Amphimachus, Lysinomus, Chirimachus, Anactor, Archelaus and Alcmena, mother of the hero Heracles.

== Mythology ==
Together with his brothers, Celaeneus was killed by the sons of the Taphian king, Pterelaus who claimed the kingdom of their ancestor Mestor, son of Perseus and brother of Electryon.
