= Alcmene (disambiguation) =

Alcmene is mother of Heracles in Greek mythology.

Alcmene or Alkmene may also refer to:

- 82 Alkmene, an asteroid
- Alkmene (apple)
- Alkmene (opera), by Giselher Klebe
- HMS Alcmene, several ships of the British Royal Navy
- French ship Alcmène, several ships of the French Navy

== See also ==
- Alcmena (disambiguation)
