= Amphimachus (son of Electryon) =

Greek mythological figure

In Greek mythology, Amphimachus (/æmˈfɪməkəs/; Ancient Greek: Ἀμφίμαχος derived from ἀμφί amphi "on both sides, in all directions, surrounding" and μαχη mache "battle") was a Mycenaean prince as the son of King Electryon and Anaxo.

== Mythology ==
Amphimachus was killed along with most of his brothers by the sons of Pterelaus.

When Electryon reigned over Mycenae, the sons of Pterelaus came with some Taphians and claimed the kingdom of Mestor, their maternal grandfather, and as Electryon paid no heed to the claim, they drove away his kine; and when the sons of Electryon stood on their defence, they challenged and slew each other. But of the sons of Electryon there survived Licymnius, who was still young; and of the sons of Pterelaus there survived Everes, who guarded the ships. Those of the Taphians who escaped sailed away, taking with them the cattle they had lifted, and entrusted them to Polyxenus, king of the Eleans; but Amphitryon ransomed them from Polyxenus and brought them to Mycenae. Wishing to avenge his sons' death, Electryon purposed to make war on the Teleboans, but first he committed the kingdom to Amphitryon along with his daughter Alcmena, binding him by oath to keep her a virgin until his return. However, as he was receiving the cows back, one of them charged, and Amphitryon threw at her the club which he had in his hands. But the club rebounded from the cow's horns and striking Electryon's head killed him. Hence Sthenelus laid hold of this pretext to banish Amphitryon from the whole of Argos, while he himself seized the throne of Mycenae and Tiryns; and he entrusted Midea to Atreus and Thyestes, the sons of Pelops, whom he had sent for.
