= Hipponome =

Greek mythological figure

In Greek mythology, Hipponome (Ancient Greek: Ἱππονόμη or Ἱππονόμης, romanized: Hipponóme, lit. 'horse-keeper', 'horse-herder' or 'one who pastures horses') was the daughter of Menoeceus from Thebes and thus sister of Creon and Jocasta. She married Alcaeus, son of Perseus and Andromeda, and had children by him, a son Amphitryon and two daughters Anaxo and Perimede. In other accounts, the wife of Alcaeus was named Astydamia, daughter of Pelops or Laonome, daughter of Guneus.

== Mythology ==
In Pseudo-Apollodorus' account of The Library, Hipponome was mentioned in the following passage:

"Alcaeus had a son Amphitryon and a daughter Anaxo by Astydamia, daughter of Pelops; but some say he had them by Laonome, daughter of Guneus, others that he had them by Hipponome, daughter of Menoeceus"
