= Creon (king of Thebes) =

Figure in Greek mythology

Kreon, also spelled Creon (/ˈkrɛɒn/; Ancient Greek: Κρέων, romanized: Kreōn, lit. 'ruler') is a figure in Greek mythology best known as the ruler of Thebes in the legend of Oedipus.

== Family ==
Creon was the son of Menoeceus, and grandson of King Pentheus. Creon had four sons and three daughters with his wife, Eurydice (sometimes known as Henioche): Henioche, Pyrrha, Megareus, Lycomedes and Haemon. Creon and his sister, Jocasta, were descendants of Cadmus and of the Spartoi. He is sometimes considered to be the same person who purified Amphitryon of the murder of his uncle Electryon and father of Megara, first wife of Heracles.

== Mythology ==
=== First Regency ===
After the death of King Laius of Thebes at the hands of his own son Oedipus, Creon became the ruler of the kingdom. During this regency, Amphitryon arrived with his fiancée Alcmena and her half-brother Licymnius from Mycenae, seeking exile and purification for the death of his prospective father-in-law King Electryon, whom he accidentally had killed. Creon purified him, and received all three as exiles in Thebes. It was then that Amphitryon gave his sister Perimede as wife to Licymnius. The latter was a bastard son of King Electryon, and the only among the brothers who did not die at the hands of the sons of King Pterelaus of Taphos.

When rancorous Alcmena arrived at Thebes, she declared that she would not marry Amphitryon until he avenged her brothers, who had died during the war between Mycenae and Taphos. Amphitryon then, wishing to marry her but lacking resources for the campaign, asked Creon to assist him.

=== Cadmean Fox ===
And so the rule of Creon, in accordance with the Theban curriculum, began with tribulation. For as soon as he came to power, the wrath of Dionysus was upon the city in the shape of a fox that was fated never to be caught. To this fox (known sometimes as the Cadmean Fox) the Thebans each month exposed one child in an attempt to prevent the beast from carrying off many others.

So, when Amphitryon asked Creon for help, he replied he would join the expedition against Taphos if Amphitryon would rid the country of the plague that was ravaging it. Amphitryon then, not being able to cope with the uncatchable fox, obtained from Cephalus the dog that his wife Procris had received from Minos, which was fated to catch whatever it pursued. And although the dilemma that arose when the two animals confronted each other was of such nature that it required the intervention of Zeus, the problem was nevertheless solved when the god turned both beasts into stone; and so Creon aided Amphitryon and, when the war was over, Alcmena married her fiancé.

=== Creon's daughters ===
Some time later Alcmena gave birth to Heracles, child of Zeus and not of Amphitryon, and when this son was grown up, he led the Thebans against Erginus, the king of the Minyans who imposed a tribute after his father was killed by Perieres, charioteer of Creon's father Menoceus. It was then that Creon rewarded Heracles by giving him in marriage his own daughter Megara. These two had children: Therimachus, Deicoon, Creontiades, and Ophites, but they were all flung into the fire by their father, when he, in a fit of madness, gave himself to domestic violence. Some say that also Megara died at the hands of her husband, but others say that Heracles gave her in marriage to his own nephew and charioteer Iolaus. It is also said that Creon gave another and younger daughter to Amphitryon's son Iphicles, who already was father of Iolaus by Automedusa, daughter of Alcathous, son of Pelops.

=== The Sphinx ===
The most serious trial that Thebes had to confront under the first rule of Creon was, however, the calamity of the Sphinx, which appeared laying waste the Theban fields, and declaring that it would not depart unless someone correctly interpreted a certain riddle which it presented. In order to face this adversity, Creon made a proclamation throughout Hellas, promising that he would give the kingdom of Thebes and his sister Jocasta in marriage whoever solved the riddle of the Sphinx. Many came and were devoured by the Sphinx, when they failed to solve her riddle.

The Sphinx was finally defeated by Oedipus, who, having heard Creon's proclamation, came to Thebes and, by solving the riddle, caused the beast to destroy itself. And since Creon fulfilled his promise, Oedipus received both the throne of his own father, whom he had murdered for a trifle on a road not knowing who the man was, and Creon's sister Jocasta as wife, unaware that this woman was his own mother.

== Theban cycle ==
=== In Sophocles ===
Creon figures prominently in the plays Oedipus Rex, Oedipus at Colonus, and Antigone, written by Sophocles.

==== Oedipus Rex ====
In Oedipus Rex, Creon is a brother of queen Jocasta, the wife of King Laius as well as Oedipus. Laius, a previous king of Thebes, had given the rule to Creon while he went to consult the oracle at Delphi. During Laius's absence, the Sphinx came to Thebes. When word came of Laius's death, Creon offered the throne of Thebes as well as the hand of his sister (and Laius's widow) Jocasta, to anyone who could free the city from the Sphinx. Oedipus answered the Sphinx's riddle and married Jocasta, unaware that she was his mother. Over the course of the play, as Oedipus comes closer to discovering the truth about Jocasta, Creon plays a constant role close to him. When Oedipus summons Tiresias to tell him what is plaguing the city and Tiresias tells him that he is the problem, Oedipus accuses Creon of conspiring against him. Creon argues that he does not want to rule and would, therefore, have no incentive to overthrow Oedipus. However, when the truth is revealed about Jocasta, and Oedipus requests to be exiled, it is Creon who grants his wish and takes the throne in his stead.

==== Antigone ====
In Antigone, Creon is the ruler of Thebes. Oedipus's sons, Eteocles and Polynices, had shared the rule jointly until they quarreled, and Eteocles expelled his brother. In Sophocles' account, the two brothers agreed to alternate rule each year, but Eteocles decided not to share power with his brother after his tenure expired. Polynices left the kingdom, gathered an army and attacked the city of Thebes in the war of the Seven against Thebes.

The Thebans won the war, but both sons of Oedipus were killed, leaving Creon as ruler once more, serving as regent for Laodamas, the son of Eteocles. Creon gives Eteocles a full and honorable burial, but orders (under penalty of death) that Polynices' corpse be left to rot on the battlefield as punishment for his treason. Antigone, the daughter of Oedipus and Jocasta, who is betrothed to Creon's son Haemon, defies him by burying her brother, and is condemned to be entombed alive as punishment. Antigone tells Creon that it is the duty of the living to bury the dead and that if a body is not buried then the one who died will wander around aimlessly for all eternity. Creon finally relents, following advice from the chorus leader (choragos), after Tiresias tells him to bury the body. However, when Creon arrives at the tomb where she was to be interred, Antigone has already hanged herself rather than be buried alive. His son, Haemon, threatens him and tries to kill him but ends up taking his own life.

== Character traits ==
Creon is pitted against Antigone, who holds up the will of the gods and the honor of her family above all else; and thus he appears to be against these values. His behavior, however, suggests otherwise. He aggressively preaches the concept of family honor to his son, Haemon. Creon also believes that his decrees are consistent with the will of the gods and with the best interests of the people, whether true or not. When a legitimate argument is raised against his course of action by Tiresias, he is in fact completely open to changing course, even before he learns of the deaths of his family members.

== Discrepancies ==
The Creon of Oedipus Rex is in some ways different and in some ways similar to the Creon of Antigone. In Oedipus Rex, he appears to favor the will of the gods above decrees of state. Even when Oedipus says that, once dethroned, he must be exiled, Creon waits for the approval of the gods to carry out the order once he has been crowned king.

Some explanation for these discrepancies in personality may be drawn from his characterization in the third of the Oedipus plays by Sophocles, Oedipus at Colonus. Here, Creon takes on another persona: that of the "hard-faced politician". He is reasonable and modest, staying calm and maintaining his dignity when condemned by Theseus. He is a "colorless figure" beyond his official position, which suggests that his differing personality traits in the books are because he is a flexible figure whom poets can characterize as they please.

== Other representations ==
Creon is also featured in Euripides' The Phoenician Women, but not in Medea—the latter had a different Creon. In Euripides' Herakles, Creon is killed in his old age when a descendant of an earlier king of Thebes named Lycus invades to take the crown.

Creon is portrayed as a tyrant in Geoffrey Chaucer's The Knight's Tale, and in a later adaptation of the same story, William Shakespeare's and John Fletcher's play The Two Noble Kinsmen. As in Antigone, he refuses to allow the burial of defeated enemies. His enemies' widows appeal to Theseus, who defeats Creon in battle. Though much discussed, he does not appear as a character in either version.

The Roman poet Statius recounts a differing version of Creon's assumption of power from that followed by Sophocles, in his first-century epic, the Thebaid. This alternate narrative may have been based on a previous epic of the Theban cycle written by the Greek poet Antimachus in the 4th or 5th century BC. Antimachus' work has been lost, but in any case, the classic myths often had more than one variation, and playwrights and poets had some freedom to choose or even innovate for dramatic effect.

== Family tree ==
Royal House of Thebes
- Solid lines indicate descendants.
- Dashed lines indicate marriages.
- Dotted lines indicate extra-marital relationships or adoptions.
- Kings of Thebes are numbered with bold names and a light purple background.
  - Joint rules are indicated by a number and lowercase letter, for example, 5a. Amphion shared the throne with 5b. Zethus.
- Regents of Thebes are alphanumbered (format AN) with bold names and a light red background.
  - The number N refers to the regency preceding the reign of the N^{th} king. Generally this means the regent served the N^{th} king but not always, as Creon (A9) was serving as regent to Laodamas (the 10th King) when he was slain by Lycus II (the usurping 9th king).
  - The letter A refers to the regency sequence. "A" is the first regent, "B" is the second, etc.
- Deities have a yellow background color.

Harmonia	1. Cadmus	Polyxo	A4. Nycteus (Regent)	Dirce	B4 & A6. Lycus (Regent)
Zeus	Zeus
Ino	Agave	Echion	3. Polydorus	Nycteis	Antiope
Semele	Autonoë
Dionysus	2. Pentheus	Epeiros	4. Labdacus	5a. Amphion	5b. Zethus
Menoeceus
Eurydice	A7, A8 & A9. Creon (Regent)	Jocasta	6. Laius	Merope	Polybus
Hipponome	Alcaeus
Zeus
Alcmene	Amphitryon	Perimede	7. Oedipus
Megara	Heracles	Iphicles	Anaxo
Henioche	Megareus	Haemon	Antigone	8b. Eteocles	Argea	8a. Polynices
Pyrrha	Lycomedes	Ismene	9. Lycus II
A12. Peneleos (Regent)	10. Laodamas	Demonassa	11. Thersander
Opheltes	12. Tisamenus
14. Damasichthon	13. Autesion
15. Ptolemy	Theras	Argeia	Aristodemus
16. Xanthos	Eurysthenes	Procles
