= Alcmena =

Alcmena may refer to:

- Alcmene, mother of Heracles in Greek mythology
- Alcmena, a genus of jumping spiders
- Dalytra, a genus of assassin bugs formerly referred to by the genus name Alcmena

== See also ==
- Alcmene (disambiguation)
