= Alkmene (opera) =

Opera by Giselher Klebe

- Opera by Giselher Klebe
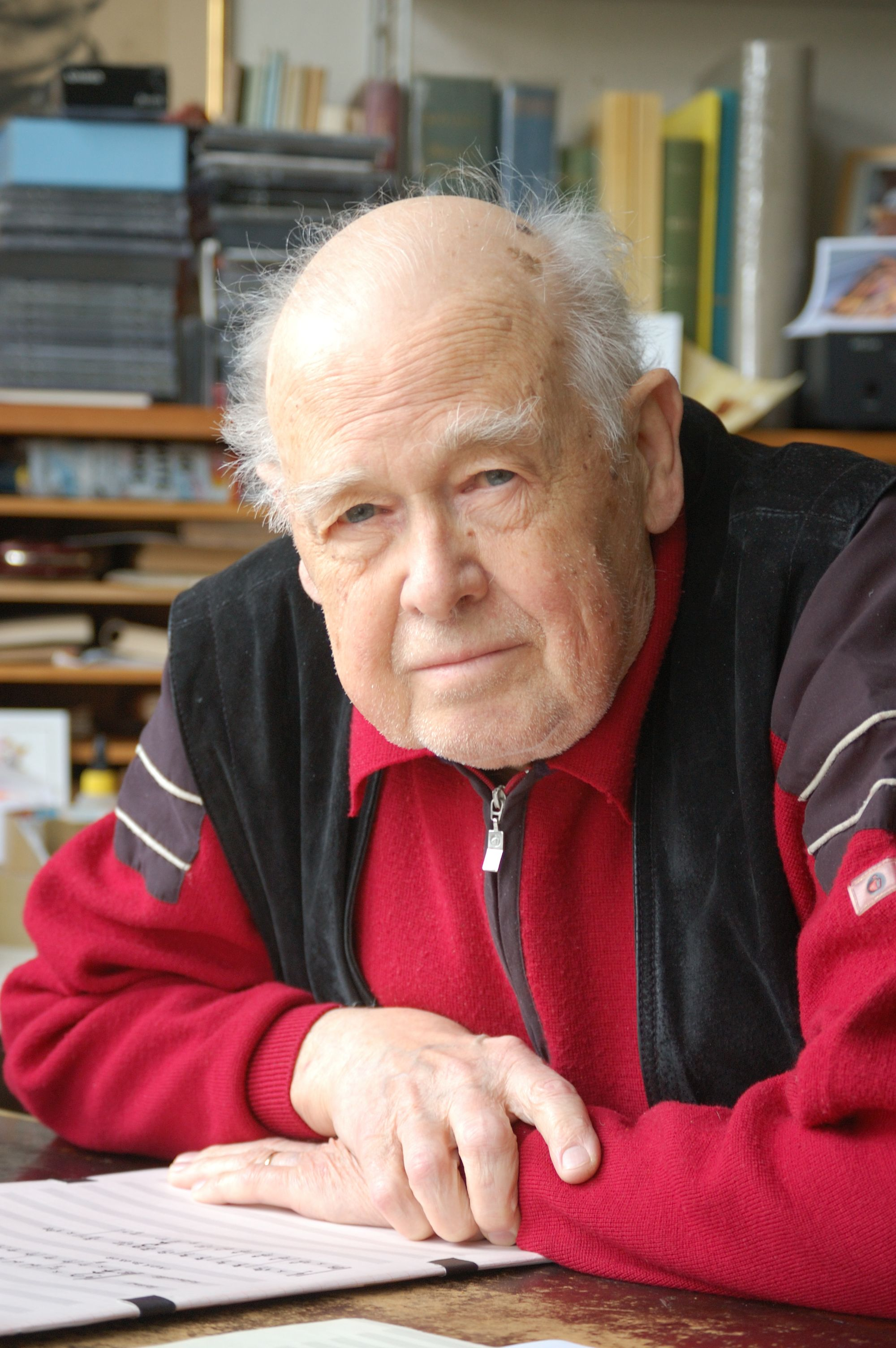
- The composer in 2008
- Librettist: Klebe
- Language: German
- Based on: Amphitryon by Heinrich von Kleist
- Premiere: 25 September 1961; Deutsche Oper Berlin

Alkmene (Alcmene), op. 36, is an opera in three acts, with music and libretto by Giselher Klebe. Klebe based the libretto on Amphitryon by Heinrich von Kleist, which in turn was based on Molière's play of the same name, and ultimately draws from the ancient Roman play Amphitryon by Plautus about Amphitryon and Alcmene. The composer dedicated the work to his mother, the violinist Gertrud Klebe.

The opera was commissioned for the opening of the current building of the Deutsche Oper Berlin where it premiered on 25 September 1961, the second production in that house.

== Roles ==
Roles, voice types, premiere cast
Role	Voice type	Premiere cast, 25 September 1961 Conductor: Heinrich Hollreiser
Jupiter	baritone	Thomas Stewart
Mercury	bass	Walter Dicks
Amphitryon, Theban field commander	tenor	Richard Lewis
Alkmene, wife of Amphitryon	soprano	Evelyn Lear
Sosias, servant to Amphitryon	bass/spoken part	Ernst Krukowski
Cleanthis, wife to Sosias	coloratura soprano	Lisa Otto
A commander	bass	
Two colonels	tenor, bass	

== Synopsis ==
The setting is mythical Thebes.

Jupiter enlists Mercury to plan a new seduction of a mortal, specifically Alkmene, wife of the Theban field commander Amphitryon. Amphitryon is in the conflict of Thebes against Athens. Because Jupiter cannot present himself in his true form to Alkmene, he chooses to appear as Amphitryon. The god appears to Alkmene and makes love with her, with Alkmene thinking that this is her husband who has returned early from battle.

The next morning, the servant Sosias announces Thebes' victory over Athens and the return of the Theban army. He sees a double of himself, who is actually Mercury, who acted as guard the night prior. Confusion follows. Alkmene then sees Amphytrion for what she thinks is the second time so soon after his recent return. Amphitryon becomes suspicious of his wife's fidelity, and summons witnesses to attest that he did not leave the army camp during the night. Alkmene is pained at these suspicions. However, Jupiter appears and tells Alkmene that her partner the night before was no mortal, but the supreme god himself.

The army commanders appear, and they and the Thebans see two Amphitryons. At first, they believe Jupiter to be the Amphitryon. However, the god reveals his true identity, and also tells Alkmene that she has conceived a child, and he will be named Hercules. Alkmeme faints. Jupiter leaves in his sun carriage. Alkmene awakens in her husband's arms, the two of them reconciled.
