= Astydameia =

Several women in Greek mythology

In Greek mythology, Astydamea or Astydamia (/əˌstɪdəˈmiːə/; Ancient Greek: Ἀστυδάμεια, romanized: Astudámeia, lit. 'tamer of the city' or 'ruler of the town', derived from ἄστυ ástu, "town", and δαμάω damáo, "to tame") is a name attributed to several individuals:

- Astydamia, also known as Hippolyta or Cretheis, daughter of Cretheus and queen of Iolcus as the wife of Acastus. Her husband purified Peleus of the murder of King Eurytion of Phthia. Astydameia fell in love with Peleus but he scorned her, so she told Acastus that Peleus had tried to rape her. Acastus took Peleus on hunting trip and left him unprotected to a Centaurs attacked. Peleus escaped death and later pillaged Iolcus and killed Astydamea.
- Astydamea, daughter of Pelops and Hippodamia. She married Alcaeus and had Amphitryon and Anaxo by him. In other accounts, the wife of Alcaeus was named Hipponome, daughter of Menoeceus or Laonome, daughter of Guneus.
- Astydamea, daughter of Phorbas and mother of Lepreus by Caucon, son of Poseidon. She persuaded Heracles to reconcile with her son, who had previously advised Augeas to cast Heracles in bonds.
- Astydamea, mother of Ctesippus by Heracles. In one source, she was the daughter of Amyntor, possibly by Kleoboule or Hippodameia. Another account makes her the daughter of Ormenus, king of Ormenion. Heracles, the same source relates, wooed her, but Ormenius would not marry her to him since Heracles was already married to Deianira. Heracles then led a war against Ormenius, killed him and took Astydameia by force. Astydameia (or Astygeneia) is also an alternate name for Astyoche, daughter of Phylas, who bore Heracles a son Tlepolemus.
- Astydamea, was briefly mentioned by a scholiast on Euripides as the daughter of Strophius and Cydragora and sister of Pylades.
