= Teutarus =

In Greek mythology, Teutarus or Teutaros (Ancient Greek: Τεύταρος) was the original owner of the bow which was used by Heracles.

== Mythology ==
Teutaros was a Scythian herdsman who served Amphitryon and taught archery to Heracles.
