= Eurydice (daughter of Pelops) =

In Greek mythology, Eurydice (/jʊəˈrɪdɪsi/; Ancient Greek: Εὐρυδίκη, Eurydikē "wide justice", derived from ευρυς eurys "wide" and δικη dike "justice) was the daughter of Pelops and was married to Electryon, king of Mycenae and son of Perseus. She gave birth to Alcmena, mother of Heracles. In other versions of the myth, Eurydice's place was taken by Anaxo, Electryon's niece.
