= Megara (wife of Heracles) =

First wife of Heracles in Greek mythology

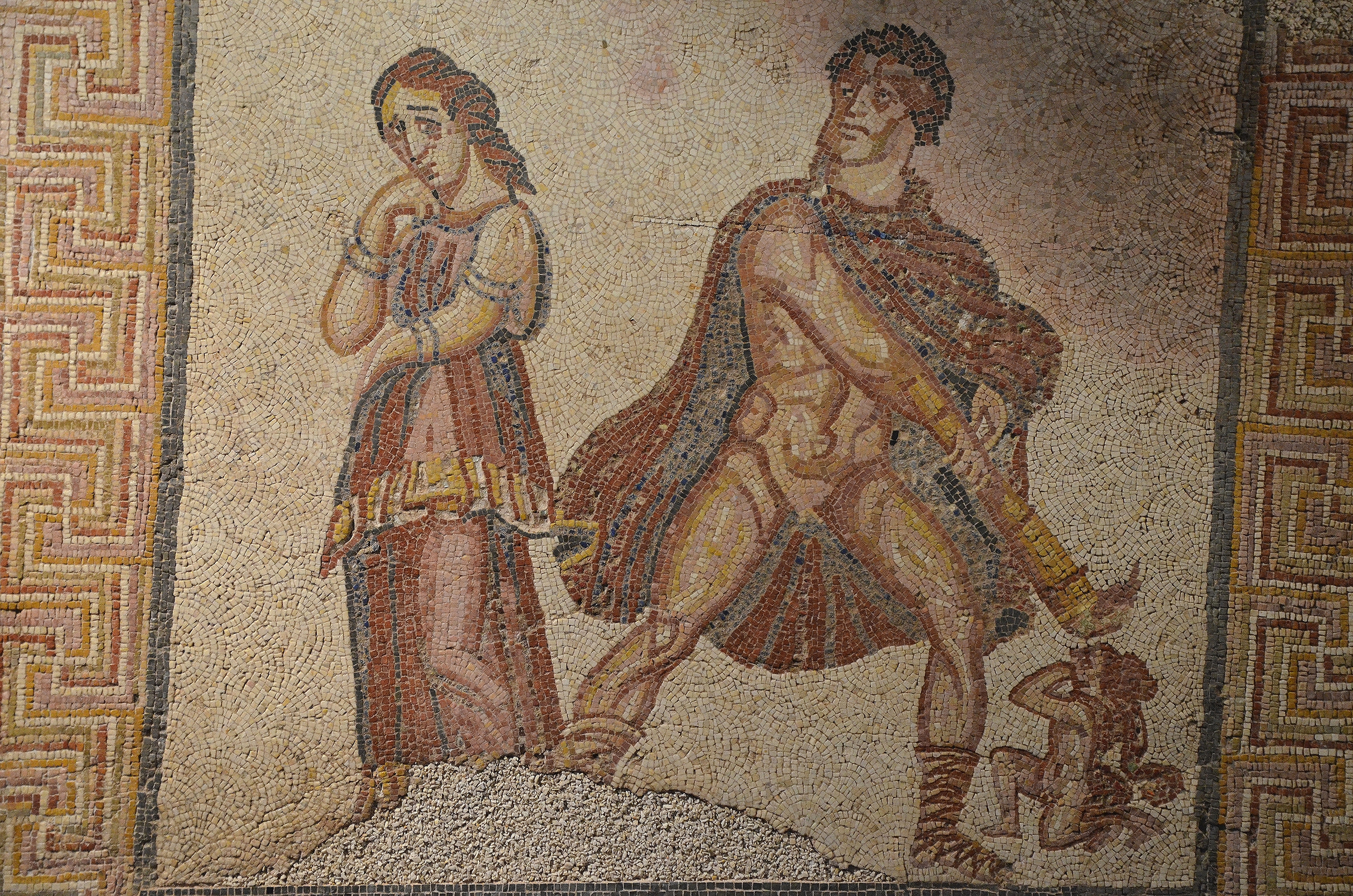
Heracles kills his son while Megara stands by.

In Greek mythology, Megara (/ˈmɛɡərə/; Ancient Greek: Μεγάρα) was a Theban princess and the first wife of the divine hero Heracles.

== Family ==
Megara was the eldest daughter of Creon, the king of Thebes, who was the brother of Jocasta and uncle of Oedipus. If Creon is the same figure, Megara's mother is likely Creon's wife Eurydice, and she would be the sister of Menoeceus (Megareus), Lycomedes, Haemon, and Pyrrha.

Accounts of the names and number of Megara and Heracles' children vary based on the author. According to the mythographer Apollodorus, Megara was the mother of three sons by Heracles named Therimachus, Creontiades, and Deicoon. Dinias the Argive included the three children named by Apollodorus, however, he also added a fourth named Deion. Theban poet Pindar states that Megara bore Heracles eight sons. Alternatively, the Roman mythographer Hyginus named their sons as Therimachus and Ophites.

== Mythology ==
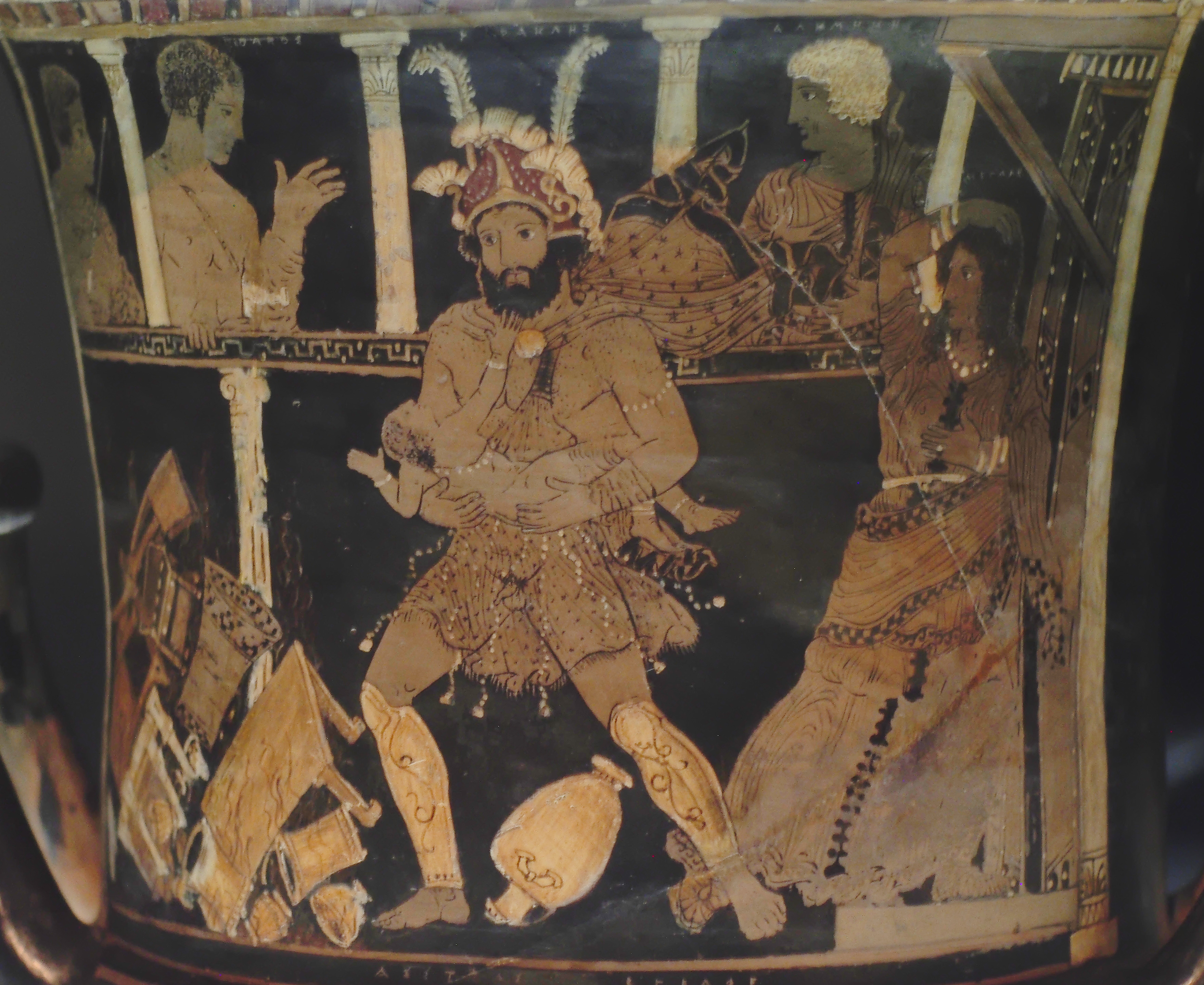
An insane Heracles is depicted killing his son while Megara stands horrified on the right side of the scene (National Archaeological Museum, Madrid, c. 350-320 B.C.E.)

Megara was married to Heracles by her father as a reward for the hero after he led the defense of Thebes against the Minyans at Orchomenus, and the couple had several sons together. Hera sent Heracles into a fit of temporary madness due to her hatred for him. In his madness, Heracles killed their children either by shooting them with arrows or by throwing them into a fire. Whether Megara also died as a result of this attack depended on the author. In some sources, after Heracles completed his Twelve Labours, Megara married Heracles' nephew Iolaus and became the mother of Leipephilene by him.

Heracles' desire to atone for the murders of his wife and children is typically cited as the catalyst for becoming a slave to his cousin Eurystheus and performing the Twelve Labours. Euripides (who is the earliest surviving author to mention this tale) presents an alternative order of events in his tragedy, Heracles, as it was the completion of the twelfth labour (retrieving Cerberus from Hades) that begun the agon. The play begins with Megara, her children, and Amphitryon as suppliants at an altar seeking refuge from the tyrant Lycus who threatens them as Heracles is in the underworld. Heracles returns to save his family, but Iris and the spirit of madness, Lyssa, cause him to go mad and kill Megara and their children since he believes he is attacking Lycus. Roman playwright Seneca the Younger retells a similar story in his play Hercules Furens.

While in the underworld, Odysseus sees Megara, but does not elaborate on her mythology beyond stating she was the daughter of Creon and the former wife of Heracles. The Hellenistic poem Megara by an unknown author, presented a dialogue at Tiryns between a mournful Megara and Heracles's mother Alcmene, as the former grieves her children and Heracles's absence during his labours.

== Cult dedicated to Megara's children ==
The sons of Heracles appear to have been incorporated into Heracles hero cult at Thebes who were celebrated at a festival known as the Herakleia where a feast was prepared in honour of Heracles above the "Elektran Gates" and sacrifices were made. The hero-tombs of the children of Heracles and Megara in Thebes they were venerated as the Chalkoarai.

== Notes ==
Preceded by ---	Wives of Heracles	Succeeded by Omphale
