= Jack Juggler =

16th-century play

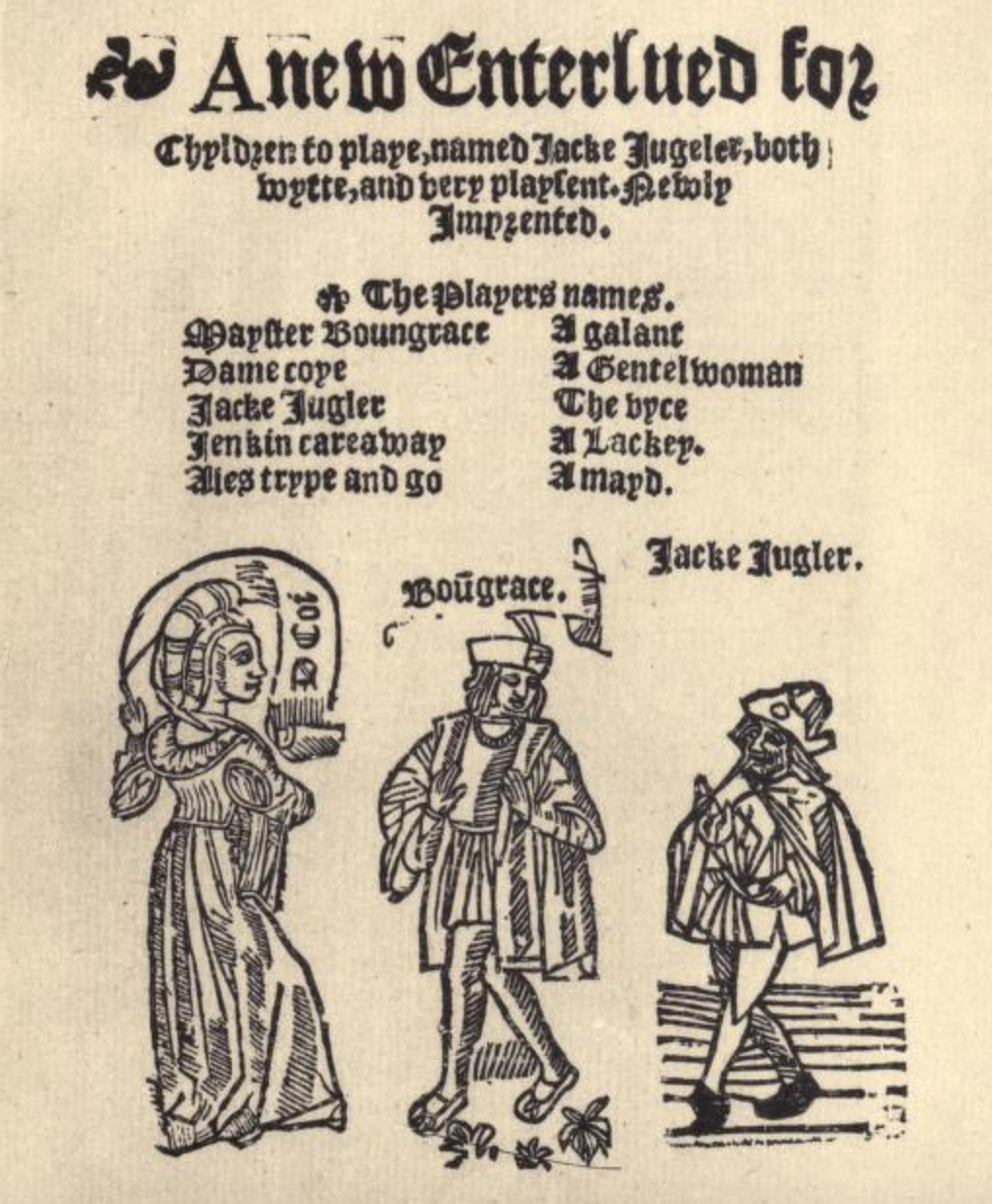
Titlepage for Jack Juggler.

Jack Juggler (full title: A new Enterlued for Chyldren to playe, named Jacke Jugeler, both wytte, and very pleysent) is an anonymous sixteenth-century comic interlude, considered to be one of the earliest examples of comedy in English alongside Ralph Roister Doister and Gammer Gurton's Needle. The play is believed to have been written sometime between 1553 and 1561 and was first published in 1562. The author of the play is uncertain, however it has been proposed to be the work of the London schoolmaster, Nicholas Udall. As the full title indicates, the play was most likely performed by a troupe of child-actors possibly at court during the Christmas season. The plot is an adaptation of a section of the play Amphitryon by the Roman comic playwright Plautus.

== Characters ==
- Jack Juggler - A vice
- Jenkin Careaway - A lackey to Jack Juggler
- Master Bongrace - A gallant.
- Dame Coy - A gentlewoman
- Alice Trip and Go - A maid.

Note that Juggler, at this time, meant trickster.

== Summary ==
=== Prologue ===
The prologue begins with a Latin quotation from the Distichs of Cato which it translates as, "Among thy careful business, use sometimes mirth and joy [so] that no bodily work, thy wits break or annoy." In a comically elevated register, the speaker of the prologue explains the importance of recreation and mirth as being restorative to the mind and introduces the work as being based on a comedy of Plautus which will not present any serious matter, but rather be light-hearted and humorous.

=== Play ===
Jenkin Careaway is a lazy servant who likes to gamble, drink, and steal, and often lies to his master (Bongrace) and mistress (Dame Coy) to get out of trouble. Jack Juggler decides to prank Careaway by dressing in Careaway's clothes and pretending to be him. The two confront one another, but Jack beats Careaway into submission. When Careaway tries to complain about the prank to his master and mistress, they do not believe him, and Careaway gets himself into more trouble in trying to explain what has happened, and, in the end, is beaten by both his master and master's wife.

=== Epilogue ===
The play is concluded by a moralizing epilogue, but many editors regard this as a later interpolation.

== Date and text ==
Jack Juggler was entered into the Register of the Stationers' Company ca. Nov. 1562 by the printer William Coplande. The play survives in three editions: ca. 1562, ca. 1565, and 1570, the final edition was printed by John Allde after Coplande's death in 1569.
