= Amphitryon 38 =

1929 play by Jean Giraudoux

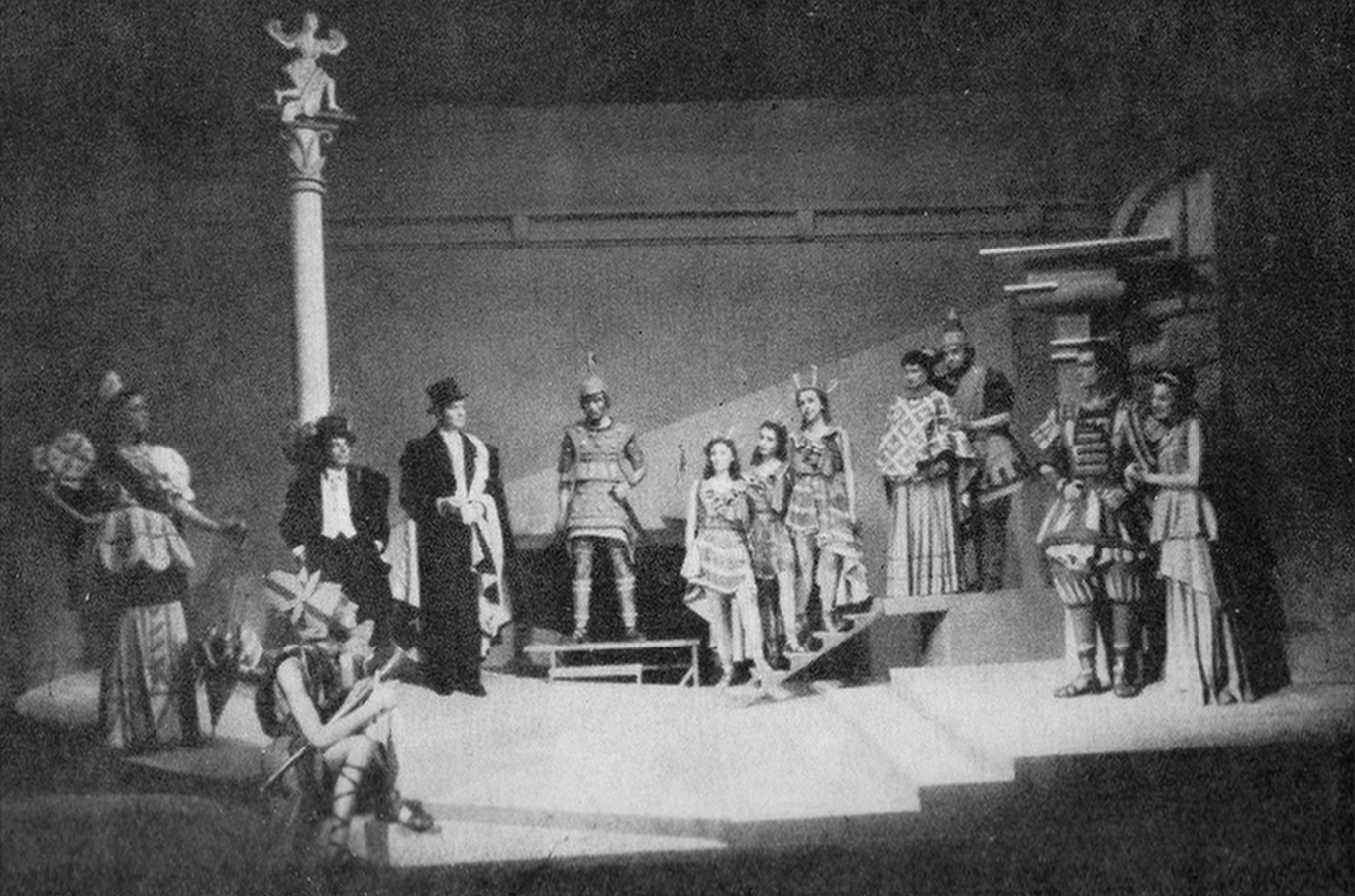
- Amphitryon 38 performance at Helena Modrzejewska National Stary Theater in Kraków, 1948
- Original language: French
- Written by: Jean Giraudoux
- Characters: Amphitryon, Alcmene, Jupiter, Mercury, Leda
- Subject: The god Jupiter intrudes into the faithful marriage of two mortals
- Genre: Drama
- Setting: Mythological ancient Greece

Premiere
- Date: 8 November 1929
- Place: Comedie des Champs-Elysees in Paris

Amphitryon 38 is a play written in 1929 by the French dramatist Jean Giraudoux, the number in the title being Giraudoux's whimsical approximation of how many times the story had been told on stage previously.

== Original productions ==
Amphitryon 38 was translated into English in 1938 by S. N. Behrman, in 1964 by Phyllis La Farge and Peter H. Judd, and in 1967 by Roger Gellert.

Amphitryon 38 was first performed on 8 November 1929 in Paris at the Comedie des Champs-Elysees in a production by Louis Jouvet.

An English production of Amphitryon 38, starring Alfred Lunt and Lynn Fontanne, opened at New York's Shubert Theatre on 1 November 1937.

In 1957 a BBC production included its first piece of commissioned electronic music, created by Daphne Oram.
