= HMS Alcmene =

Three ships of the Royal Navy have borne the name HMS Alcmene. In Greek mythology, Alcmene or Alcmena (Greek: Aλκμήνη) was the mother of Heracles:

- HMS Alcmene (1779) was a 32-gun fifth rate captured from the French in 1779 and sold in 1784.
- HMS Alcmene (1794) was a 32-gun fifth rate launched in 1794 and wrecked in 1809.
- HMS Alcmene (1809) was a 38-gun fifth rate, formerly the French frigate Topaze. She was captured in 1809 and commissioned as HMS Jewel. She was renamed HMS Alcmene later that year and was broken up in 1816.
