= Alcmena (spider) =

- female A. psittacina, 1846 drawing
- male A. amabilis

Scientific classification
- Kingdom: Animalia
- Phylum: Arthropoda
- Subphylum: Chelicerata
- Class: Arachnida
- Order: Araneae
- Infraorder: Araneomorphae
- Family: Salticidae
- Subfamily: Salticinae
- Genus: Alcmena; C. L. Koch, 1846

Type species
- Alcmena psittacina C. L. Koch, 1846

Species
- See text.

Genus of spiders

Alcmena is a genus of jumping spiders. The genus was first described by Carl Ludwig Koch in 1846 based on the species Alcmena psittacina and Alcmena amabilis. The genus consists of four species endemic to North and South America. A fifth species, Alcmena trifasciata, was described by Caporiacco in 1954, but declared a nomen dubium by Ruiz and Brescovit in 2008.

== Name ==
The genus name is derived from Alcmene, the mother of Heracles in Greek mythology.

== Species ==
- Alcmena amabilis C. L. Koch, 1846 – Mexico
- Alcmena psittacina C. L. Koch, 1846 – Brazil
- Alcmena tristis Mello-Leitão, 1945 – Argentina
- Alcmena vittata Karsch, 1880 – Venezuela
