= Anaxo (daughter of Alcaeus) =

In Greek mythology, Anaxo (Ancient Greek: Ἀναξώ, lit. 'lady', 'mistress' or 'female ruler') was the daughter of Alcaeus (son of Perseus and Andromeda) and Astydameia (daughter of Pelops and Hippodamia). Her mother was also named as Laonome, daughter of Guneus, otherwise she was Hipponome, daughter of Menoeceus.

Anaxo was the sister of Amphitryon and Perimede, wife of Licymnius. She married Electryon, king of Mycenae, and her own uncle. Her children were Alcmene, Stratobates, Gorgophonus, Phylonomus, Celaeneus, Amphimachus, Lysinomus, Cheirimachus, Anactor, and Archelaus.
