= Amphitryon (film) =

1935 film

- Directed by: Reinhold Schünzel
- Screenplay by: Reinhold Schünzel
- Based on: Amphitryon by: Plautus; Molière; Heinrich von Kleist
- Produced by: Günther Stapenhorst
- Starring: Willy Fritsch
- Cinematography: Werner Bohne; Fritz Arno Wagner
- Edited by: Arnfried Heyne
- Music by: Franz Doelle
- Production company: UFA
- Distributed by: UFA
- Release date: 18 July 1935
- Running time: 105 minutes
- Country: Nazi Germany
- Language: German

Amphitryon is a 1935 German musical film. Written and directed by Reinhold Schünzel, it is based on plays by Molière, Plautus, and Heinrich von Kleist, which in turn are based on Greek mythology. On the contrary, Rafael de España, an expert in Greek-themed cinema, points out that it is not a direct adaptation of any of the previous works, but rather a work with multiple humorous anachronisms taken from the American film Roman Scandals (1932).

The film is known by a variety of other names: Amphitryon – Happiness from the Clouds, Amphitryon – Aus den Wolken kommt das Glück in Austria, Amfitryon in Greece, Anfitrione in Italy, Det gudomliga äventyret in Sweden.

Amphitryon was filmed in Ufa-Atelier, Neubabelsberg, from 2 February 1935 – May 1935. It was one of UFA's many multiple-language version films: a French version, Les dieux s'amusent (The gods are having fun), was shot at the same time.

== Synopsis ==
Amphitryon is a Theban general away at war. The god Jupiter disguises himself as Amphitryon to seduce Amphitryon's wife, Alkmene.

== Cast ==
- Willy Fritsch as Jupiter / Amphitryon
- Paul Kemp as Merkur / Sosias
- Käthe Gold as Alkmene
- Fita Benkhoff as Andria
- Adele Sandrock as Juno
- Hilde Hildebrand as 1. Freundin Alkmenes
- Vilma Bekendorf as 2. Freundin Alkmenes
- Annie Ann as 3. Freundin Alkmenes
- Hilde Boenisch as 4. Freundin Alkmenes
- Ewald Wenck as Dr. Äskulap
- Aribert Wäscher as Thebener Kriegsminister
- Ellen-Ruth Knapp-Güttingen as 1. Thebener Ehefrau
- Annemarie Korff as 2. Thebener Ehefrau
- Liesl Otto as 3. Thebener Ehefrau
- Annemarie Schwindt as 4. Thebener Ehefrau
- Albert Karchow as Alter Grieche

== Soundtrack ==
- "Tausendmal war ich im Traum bei dir"

Lyrics by Charles Amberg (as C. Amberg)
Music by Franz Doelle

- "Ich muß mal wieder was erleben"

Lyrics by Bruno Balz
Music by Franz Doelle
