= Amphitryon (Molière play) =

Play by Molière

Amphitryon is a French language comedy in a prologue and 3 Acts by Molière which is based on the story of the Greek mythological character Amphitryon as told by Plautus in his play from ca. 190–185 B.C. The play was first performed at the Théâtre du Palais-Royal in Paris on 13 January 1668. A whiff of scandal surrounded the play, with some claiming that Molière was criticizing the amorous affairs of Louis XIV in the guise of Jupiter. It was performed again three days later at the Tuileries Garden in the presence of Louis XIV.

Amphitryon was an immediate success with the French aristocracy and the play was performed a total of 29 times by Easter 1668. The popularity of the work was such that one of the names of the characters became a part of the everyday French language. The word 'Sosie' in French now means look-alike, a reflection of the events in the play where the character Sosie (a part which was portrayed by Molière himself in the comedy's first production) is a doppelgänger of the God Mercury.

The plot can be summarized as follows. After his wedding night with beautiful Alcmene, Amphitryon leaves to participate in a war. Jupiter, who is fascinated by Alcmene's beauty, comes to earth under the appearance of Amphitryon, accompanied by Mercury who has taken the appearance of Amphitryon's servant Sosie. Amphitryon is successful in war and sends Sosie back home to report this. Sosie is greeted by his look-alike Mercury, who beats him and convinces him that he Mercury is the real Sosie. The real Amphitryon meets Alcmene and is naturally confused and shocked by her account of an amorous night. Various other confusing episodes of the same type take place, including a confrontation between the two Amphitryons. In the end, Jupiter assumes his real aspect and tells Amphitryon that his wife was faithful, since he had to take on Amphitryon's aspect in order to seduce her. He informs Amphitryon that his wife will bear Jupiter's child, the demi-god Hercules.

The Australian-born poet W. J. Turner wrote an English adaptation of the play, known as "Jupiter Translated", which premiered in London in 1933 with music composed by Anthony Bernard. Richard Wilbur translated the play for the work's first US production which was directed by Darko Tresnjak and presented by the Huntington Theatre Company in Boston in March 2001.

This is one of Molière's only two pièces à machines (plays that make extensive use of stage machinery), the other being Dom Juan.
