= Everes (mythology) =

Greek mythological figures

In Greek mythology, Everes or Eueres (Ancient Greek: Εὐήρους or Εὐήρης, romanized: Euerēs) may refer to the following characters:

- Everes, the Theban father, by the nymph Chariclo, of Tiresias. He may be a descendant of Udaeus, one of the Spartoi.
- Everes, an Arcadian son of Heracles and Parthenope, daughter of King Stymphalus of Arcadia.
- Everes, a Taphian prince who was the only one to survive among the sons of King Pterelaus of Taphos, who was at war with Mycenae. He was the brother of Chromius, Tyrannus, Antiochus, Chersidamas and Mestor.
