= Amphimachus II of Elis =

Polixeno's son

In Greek mythology, Amphimachus (/æmˈfɪməkəs/; Ancient Greek: Ἀμφίμαχος derived from ἀμφί amphi "on both sides, in all directions, surrounding" and μαχη mache "battle") son of Polyxenus and was also the king of Elis. He was named after Amphimachus, son of Cteatus. He was the father of Eleius, his successor.

== Mythology ==
=== Pausanias' account ===
"Polyxenus came back safe from Troy and begat a son, Amphimachus. This name I think Polyxenus gave his son because of his friendship with Amphimachus, the son of Cteatus, who died at Troy. Amphimachus begat Eleius..."
