= Chromius =

In Greek mythology, Chromius (Ancient Greek: Χρόμιος) was the name of the following characters.

- Chromius, a Pylian prince as the son of King Neleus and Chloris, daughter of the Minyan king, Orchomenus.
- Chromius, a Taphian prince as the son of King Pterelaus of Taphos. Along with most of his brothers, he was killed by the sons of Electryon during their battle.
- Chromius, a Trojan prince as the son of King Priam of Troy. He was slain together with his brother Echemmon by Diomedes during the Trojan War.
- Chromius or Chromis, a Mysian ally of Priam in the Trojan War. He was the son of Arsinoos and brother of Ennomus.
- Chromius, a Lycian soldier who followed their leader, Sarpedon, to fight in the Trojan War. He was slain by the Ithacan hero Odysseus.
- Chromius, a native of Pylos who fought under their leader Nestor during the Trojan War.
- Chromius, an Achaean warrior who was slayed in the Trojan War by the Mysian Eurypylus, son of King Telephus.
- Chromius, a defender of Troy who was shot dead by the Greek hero, Teucer, during the Trojan War.
- Chromius, Trojan warrior.

== See also ==
- List of Trojan War characters
