= French ship Alcmène =

Alcmène has been the name of several ships in the French Navy including:

- French frigate Alcmène (1774), launched in 1774 and captured by the Royal Navy in 1779
- French frigate Alcmène (1811), launched in 1811 and captured by the Royal Navy in 1814
- French corvette Alcmène (1834), launched in 1834 and wrecked in 1851
