= Guneus =

Set of mythological Greek characters

In Greek mythology, the name Guneus (/ˈɡjuːniːəs/; Ancient Greek: Γουνεὐς, romanized: Gouneús, lit. 'fruitful land' or 'man from the fertile soil') may refer to:

- Guneus, a man from Pheneus and father of Laonome, wife of Alcaeus. Through his daughter, he was the grandfather of Amphitryon, Anaxo and Perimede.
- Guneus, leader of the Aenianes and Perrhaebians during the Trojan War. According to Homer, "Guneus brought two and twenty ships from Cyphus, and he was followed by the Enienes and the valiant Peraebi, who dwelt about wintry Dodona." Guneus survived the war, and went to Libya where he settled near the Cinyps River. Guneus was an obscure character, though his tribal followers (Aenienians and Perrhaebians) are usually placed in northwestern Greece. Homer does not record his pedigree, but elsewhere his parents were called Ocytus and Aurophyte or Tauropoleia (or Hippodameia). In a rare account, his father was called Cyphos, the eponym of Cyphus, with no mention of a mother. He may have had a brother named Ainos, whom Odysseus buried while he was fetching provisions in Thrace.
