= Cyphus =

Town of Perrhaebia in ancient Thessaly

Cyphus or Kyphos (Ancient Greek: Κύφος) was a town of Perrhaebia in ancient Thessaly, which, according to Homer's Catalogue of Ships in the Iliad, supplied 22 ships for the Trojan War. It is placed by Strabo at the foot of Mount Olympus. According to Stephanus of Byzantium, there were two cities of the name of Cyphus, one mentioned by Homer, and the other by Lycophron; but in this he appears to have been mistaken.
