= Antiochus (mythology) =

In Greek mythology, the name Antiochus (Ancient Greek: Ἀντίοχος derived from αντι anti "against, compared to, like" and οχη oche "support") may refer to:

- Antiochus, son of Heracles and Meda. Both his maternal grandfather and his own son bore the name Phylas. He was the eponym of the Athenian phyle Antiochis.
- Antiochus, one of the Aetolian eight sons of Melas who were killed by Tydeus for plotting against Oeneus.
- Antiochus, a Taphian prince as one of the sons of King Pterelaus of Taphos.
- Antiochus, one of the sons of Aegyptus. He married (and was killed by) Itea, daughter of Danaus.
- Antiochus, one of the sacrificial victims of Minotaur.
- Antiochus, a follower of Aegisthus and Clytemnestra. Together with Argeios, he attacked a group of Agamemnon's men when they returned from Troy, including Mestor and Alcmeon.
