= Comaetho =

List of eponymous characters of Greek mythology

In Greek mythology, Comaetho (/koʊˈmiːθoʊ/; Ancient Greek: Κομαιθώ Komaithṓ means "bright-haired") is a name that may refer to:

- Comaetho, a nymph of a spring who incessantly mingles her waters with those of the river god Cydnus, who in one passage of Nonnus' Dionysiaca is said to be her father, and in another her consort.
- Comaetho, a beautiful Patraean priestess who served in the temple of Artemis Triclaria and was in love with Melanippus. They could not marry each other, so they met secretly in the temple and had sex inside. Artemis demanded their sacrifice as punishment.
- Comaetho, the daughter of Pterelaos and princess of the Taphians. The Taphians were at war with Thebes, led by Amphitryon, with whom Comaetho fell in love. The Taphians remained invincible until Comaetho, out of love for Amphitryon, plucked out the single golden hair, possession of which had bestowed upon her father the gifts of immortality and invincibility. Having defeated the enemy, Amphitryon put Comaetho to death in retribution for her deed of filial perfidy and handed over the kingdom of the Taphians to Cephalus. The story is parallel to that of Scylla (princess); compare also Pisidice and Leucophrye.
- Comaetho, daughter of Tydeus and sister of Diomedes, mother of Cyanippus by Aegialeus.
