= Laonome =

Series of figures in Greek mythology

In Greek mythology, the name Laonome (Ancient Greek: Λαονόμη, lit. 'law of the people' derived from laos "people" and nomos, "law") may refer to:

- Laonome, daughter of Guneus, possible spouse of Alcaeus and mother of Amphitryon, Anaxo and Perimede. She was a woman of Pheneus where Heracles migrated first and lived with her after he was expelled by Eurystheus. This happened before the hero went to Thebes and later on settled there.
- Laonome, daughter of Amphitryon and Alcmene (thus granddaughter of the precedent), sister of Iphicles and half-sister of Heracles. She married an Argonaut, either Euphemus or Polyphemus.
- Laonome, mother by Hodoedocus of Kalliaros, eponym of the city Kalliaros in Locris.
