= Asius of Samos =

Ancient Greek poet

Asius of Samos (Ancient Greek: Ἄσιος ὁ Σάμιος, Asios ho Samios) was an ancient Greek poet whose work survives in the form of fragments quoted by other ancient authors. All that is known about the man is that he was from Samos and that his father's name was Amphiptolemus. His era is inferred from the style and content of the remains, which suit the archaizing movement of the sixth century BCE. Antiquity left no titles or synopses, so the number, scope and focus of his works is unknown, but to judge from the ancient testimonia and the content of the fragments themselves he appears to have specialized in genealogical epic comparable to the fragmentary Hesiodic Catalogue of Women. Asius' preserved genealogies show a preoccupation with Hesiod's Boeotia, in addition to details concerning his own native Samos. Besides the 13 fragments surviving from his hexametric poetry, there is a short and enigmatic fragment in elegiacs.

== Editions and translations ==
- Kinkel, G. (1877), Epicorum Graecorum fragmenta, vol. 1, Leipzig: Lipsiae, in aedibus B.G. Teubneri.
- Bernabé, A. (1988), Poetae epici Graecae, vol. pars i, Leipzig: Walter de Gruyter, ISBN 978-3-598-71706-2.
- Davies, M. (1988), Epicorum Graecorum fragmenta, Göttingen: Vandenhoeck & Ruprecht, ISBN 978-3-525-25747-0.
- West, M.L. (2003), Greek Epic Fragments, Loeb Classical Library, vol. 497, Cambridge, MA: Harvard University Press, ISBN 978-0-674-99605-2. (Greek text with facing English translation)
