= Electryon =

Mythological king of Tiryns and Mycenae

Personal details
- Spouse: Anaxo or Eurydice
- Children: Alcmena Stratobates Gorgophonus Phylonomus Celaeneus Amphimachus Lysinomus Chirimachus Anactor Archelaus Licymnius
- Parents: Perseus (father); Andromeda (mother)

In Greek mythology, Electryon (/ɪˈlɛktriən/;Ancient Greek: Ἠλεκτρύων) was a king of Tiryns and Mycenae or Medea in Argolis.

== Family ==
Electryon was the son of Perseus and Andromeda and thus brother of Perses, Alcaeus, Heleus, Mestor, Sthenelus, Cynurus, Gorgophone and Autochthe.

He is most commonly married to Anaxo, daughter of his brother Alcaeus and sister of Amphitryon, but was instead married to Eurydice, daughter of Pelops, in some versions of the myth. His wife bore him a daughter Alcmena and many sons: Stratobates, Gorgophonus, Phylonomus, Celaeneus, Amphimachus, Lysinomus, Chirimachus, Anactor, and Archelaus. Electryon had an illegitimate son Licymnius by Midea, a Phrygian woman.

== Mythology ==
The six sons of Pterelaus, King of the Taphians, descended from Electryon's brother Mestor came to Mycenae to claim a share of kingdom. When Electryon spurned their request, they drove off his cattle; Electryon's sons battled against them, and all but Licymnius (on one side) and Everes (on the other) died. Everes sold the cattle to Polyxenus of Elis. Amphitryon, Electryon's nephew and promised in marriage to Alcmene, bought the cattle and returned them to his uncle, but accidentally killed him as he threw his club at one of the cows. However, there is an earlier tradition that Amphitryon killed him in a fit of anger over some cattle. Electryon's brother Sthenelus seized the throne of Mycenae, charged Amphitryon with murder, and sent him into exile.

Preceded by Perseus	King of Mycenae	Succeeded by Sthenelus
Preceded by Perseus	King of Tiryns	Succeeded by Sthenelus
