= Amphitryon (Plautus play) =

Ancient Roman play by Plautus

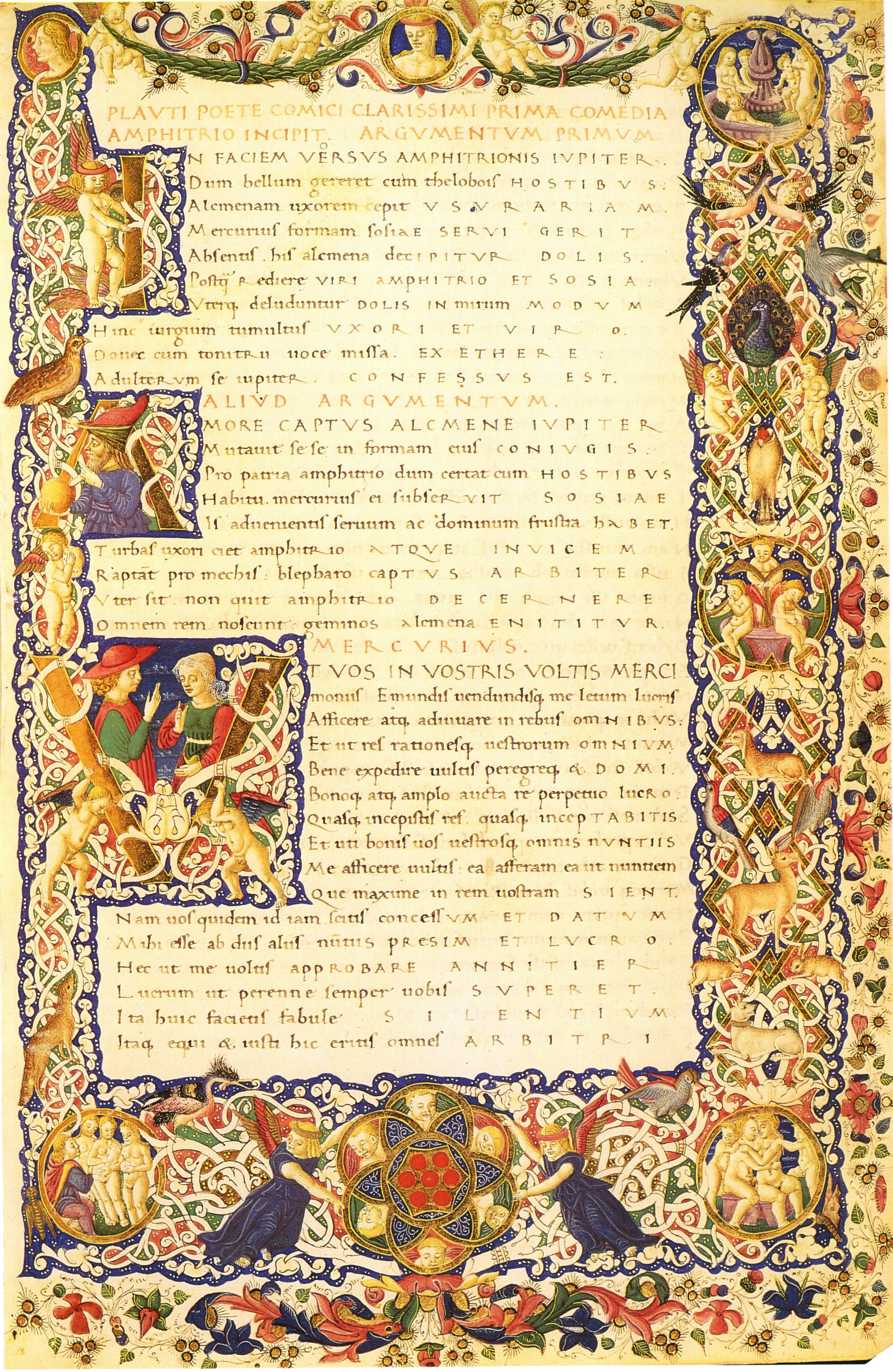
- 15th century Florentine manuscript of Amphitryon
- Written by: Plautus
- Characters: Mercury; Jupiter; Sosia (Amphitryon’s slave); Amphitryon; Alcmena (Amphitryon’s wife); Blepharo (ship’s pilot); Bromia (Alcmena’s maid)
- Setting: Thebes, before the house of Amphitryon

Amphitryon or Amphitruo is a Latin play for the early Roman theatre by playwright Titus Maccius Plautus. It is Plautus’s only play on a mythological subject. The play is mostly extant, but has a large missing section in its latter portion. The plot of the play involves Amphitryon’s jealous and confused reaction to Alcmena’s seduction by Jupiter, and ends with the birth of Hercules. There is a subplot in which Jupiter's son Mercury, keeping watch outside the house while his father is inside, has fun teasing first Amphitryon's servant Sosia, and then Amphitryon himself.

The play is thought to be relatively late in Plautus's works, probably from the period 190–185 BC. One indication of this is the large amount of sung verse. Another is the description of Alcumena in line 703 as a bacchant, which may be connected with the Senate decree on Bacchanalia of 186 BC. The mention of another play in lines 91–2 may be a reference to Ennius's play Ambracia of 188.

The character Mercury describes this play as a tragicomoedia (lines 59, 63). One theory is that Plautus based his play on a Greek tragedy, such as Euripides Alcmene, turning it into a comedy by additions of his own; however, this is not certain.

== Plot ==
The prologue, read in Latin

Amphitryon begins with a prologue given by the god Mercury, in which he gives some background information to the audience. Amphitryon and his slave Sosia have been away at war and are returning to Thebes. Meanwhile, the god Jupiter is sleeping with Amphitryon's wife Alcmena. Jupiter is in the guise of Amphitryon so that Alcmena is unaware that he is not her husband.

Mercury's job is to buy his father Jupiter some time by deceiving those who would interfere. He changes his appearance to look like the slave Sosia, and when the real Sosia arrives, he beats him up and sends him away from the house. Thoroughly confused by having been beat up by himself, Sosia returns to the ship to relay what happened to his master Amphitryon.

The following morning, Amphitryon sets off for the house, annoyed by his slave's foolish-sounding story. Jupiter departs only moments before Amphitryon arrives, and when Alcmena sees her real husband, she is confused as to why he has returned so quickly. Amphitryon doesn't appreciate this strange welcome after being gone for so many months, and confusion turns to anger and jealousy after learning that she has slept with a man who is not himself. He goes off to the harbour to fetch a witness.

Now Jupiter returns to enjoy a second session with Alcmena. He calms her anger and sends her into the house. Before going in to join her he orders his son Mercury to keep Amphitryon away. Mercury seizes the opportunity to have more fun, this time teasing Amphitryon by throwing water and a tile at him from the roof of the house.

(There are some missing pages in the text at this point.)

A nurse comes out and reports that Alcmena has miraculously given birth to twin boys. One is the son of Amphitryon, the other is Hercules, the son of Jupiter. To quell Amphitryon's anger, Jupiter now returns and explains to Amphitryon what he did. Amphitryon is then honored to have shared his wife with a god.

== Metrical structure ==
Plautus's plays are traditionally divided into five acts; these are referred to here for convenience, since many editions make use of them. However, it is not thought that they go back to Plautus's time, since no manuscript contains them before the 15th century. Also, the acts themselves do not always match the structure of the plays, which is more clearly shown by the variation in metres.

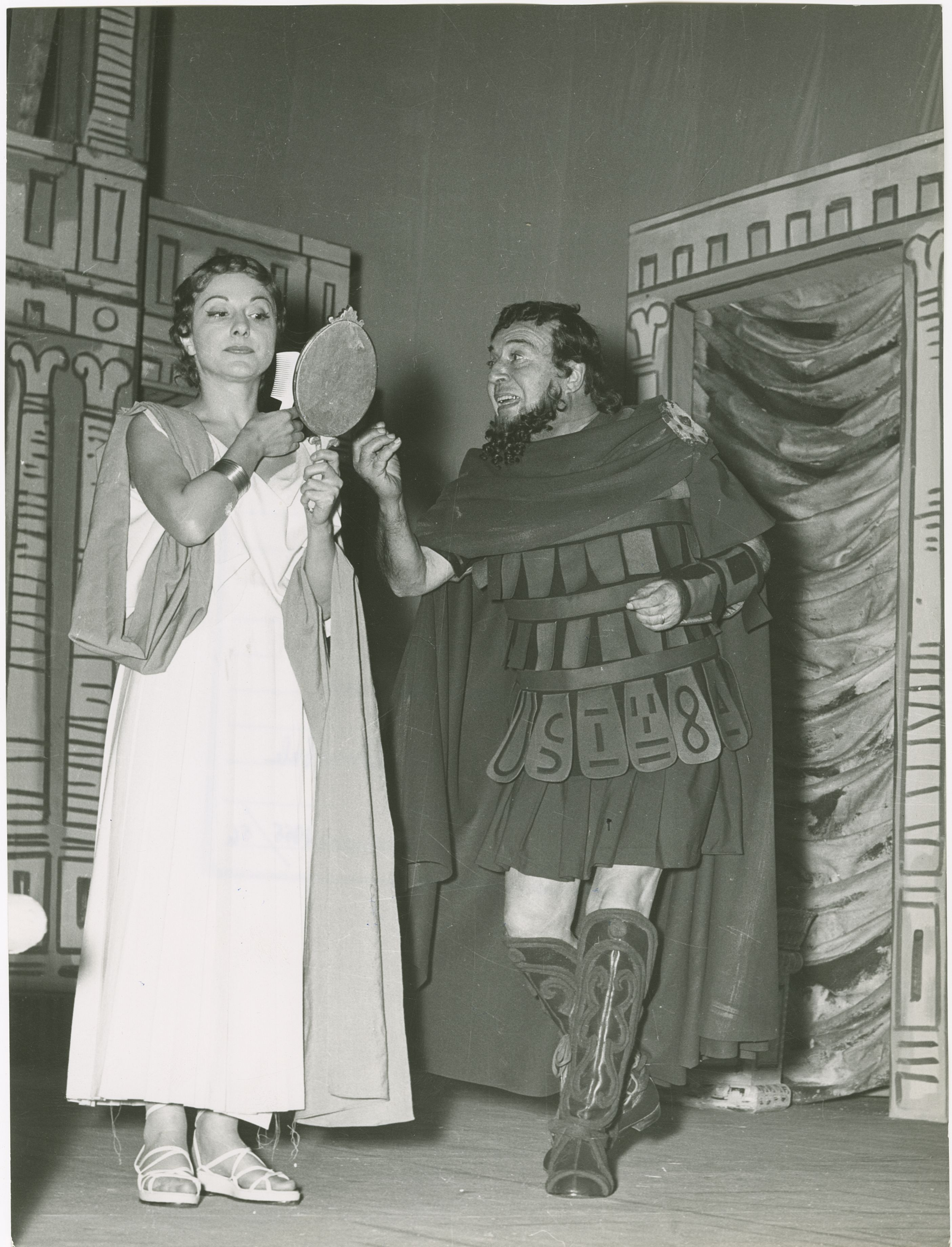
Valeria Valeri and Annibale Ninchi in a 1956 performance in Genoa.

The usual metrical pattern is to begin each section with iambic senarii (which were spoken without music), then a song (canticum) in various metres, and finally each section is rounded off by trochaic septenarii, which were apparently recited to the accompaniment of tibiae (a pair of reed pipes). Moore calls this the "ABC succession", where A = iambic senarii, B = other metres, and C = trochaic septenarii.

Metrically this play can be divided into five sections, each section having two parts, as follows:

1. The gods cause mischief: ABC, AC
2. Amphitruo's distress: BC, BC
3. The gods cause mischief again: AC, ABAC
4. Amphitruo's distress: (A)...C (there is a gap in the text here)
5. Everything is explained: BC, AC

An unusual metrical feature of the play is the large number of lines of iambic octonarii, more than any other Plautus play. The octonarii occur especially in the two messenger speeches, one describing Amphitruo's battle, and the other describing the birth of Hercules, each of which has a similar pattern of (a) iambic octonarii (type a), (b) other metres, (c) iambic octonarii (type b). Another passage of iambic octonarii is Mercury's gleeful speech in act 3 (lines 984–1005), anticipating the fun he is going to have teasing Amphitruo.

=== Mercury teases Sosia ===
- Prologue (1–152): iambic senarii (152 lines)

The god Mercury introduces himself. He asks for good behaviour from the audience, and explains that Jupiter is visiting Alcumena disguised as her husband Amphitruo. Mercury says he has disguised himself as Amphitruo's slave Sosia and is keeping watch outside the house.

- Act 1.1 (153–262): iambic octonarii (type a); polymetric; iambic octonarii (type a); cretic; iambic octonarii (type b) (110 lines)

While Mercury overhears and makes comments, the real Sosia complains about how dangerous it is for a slave to walk in the streets at night (ia8), and sings of the miseries of a slave's life (polymetric). He describes preparations for the battle which Amphitruo has just fought with the Teleboans (ia8), the battle itself (cretics), and the golden cup which Amphitruo was given afterwards (ia8).

- Act 1.1 (cont.) (263–462): trochaic septenarii (200 lines)

Sosia is surprised that the night is lasting so long. As he approaches the house he notices Mercury. There is an altercation, and Mercury punches Sosia and sends him away.

=== Jupiter departs ===
- Act 1.2 (463–498): iambic senarii (36 lines)

Mercury addresses the audience and predicts that Alcumena will have two children, one Amphitruo's and the other Jupiter's.

- Act 1.3 (499–550): trochaic septenarii (52 lines)

Jupiter and Alcumena come out from the house. Jupiter tells her that he must return now to the army, and gives her a gold cup which he says he won in the recent battle. Mercury, playing the part of Sosia, makes mischievous comments.

=== Amphitruo is annoyed with Sosia ===
- Act 2.1 (551–585): mainly bacchiac, then trochaic (35 lines)

Amphitruo and Sosia enter. Amphitruo is angry with Sosia for telling lies. He accuses him of being drunk.

- Act 2.1 (cont.) (586–632): trochaic septenarii (47 lines)

Sosia tries to explain again the miraculous thing that has happened, while Amphitruo continues to disbelieve him.

=== Amphitruo is annoyed with Alcumena ===
- Act 2.2 (633–653): mainly bacchiac (20 lines)

Alcumena emerges from the house and sings of her unhappiness that her husband has left her so soon.

- Act 2.2 (cont.) (654–860): trochaic septenarii (207 lines)

Sosia notices that Alcumena is pregnant. Alcumena is surprised that Amphitruo has come back so quickly. Amphitruo thinks she must be mad to claim that he has visited her already. Alcumena produces the gold cup as proof. Amphitruo accuses her of adultery, and she protests. He says he is going back to the ship to fetch her kinsman Naucrates as a witness.

=== Jupiter returns ===
- Act 3.1–3.2 (861–955): iambic senarii (95 lines)

Jupiter, still disguised as Amphitruo, addresses the audience. Alcumena comes out, indignant at being falsely accused. Jupiter soothes her anger, telling her that he had only been joking.

- Act 3.3 (956–973): trochaic septenarii (18 lines)

Jupiter sends Sosia to fetch Blepharo, the ship's captain. Meanwhile he asks Alcumena to go inside and prepare a home-coming sacrifice.

=== Mercury teases Amphitruo ===
- Act 3.3 (cont.) (974–983): iambic senarii (10 lines)

When the others have gone, Jupiter calls on the absent Mercury to prevent Amphitruo from coming to the house so that he can spend more time with Alcumena. He goes inside.

- Act 3.4 (984–1005): iambic octonarii (mixed type) (22 lines)

Mercury enters, disguised as Sosia, and says he is going to go up on the roof and pretend to be drunk.

- Act 3.4 (cont.) (1006–1008): iambic senarii (3 lines)

Mercury briefly explains again to the audience what he is going to do.

- Act 4.1–4.2 (1009–1034): trochaic septenarii (26 lines)

Amphitruo returns, having failed to find Naucrates. He is surprised to find the door locked. Mercury answers rudely from the roof, pretending not to know him, and throws water and a tile at him. He tells him he can't be Amphitruo since Amphitruo is inside with Alcumena.

=== Amphitruo's distress again ===
(At this point there is a gap of about 300 lines in the text. A few fragments quoted by the grammarian Nonius in iambic senarii indicate that these lines included another quarrel between Amphitruo and Alcumena. At some stage Sosia returns with the ship-captain Blepharo and Amphitruo quarrels with Sosia. Jupiter now appears, making it difficult for Blepharo to decide which is the real Amphitruo.)

- Act 4.3 (1035–1052): trochaic septenarii (18 lines)

Blepharo announces that he is departing. Jupiter also goes inside, revealing that Alcumena is giving birth. Amphitruo, declaring that he has been subject to witchcraft, says he is going to burst into his house and kill everyone inside; not even Jupiter will stop him.

=== Alcumena gives birth ===
- Act 5.1 (1053–1085): iambic octonarii (type a); other metres; iambic octonarii (type b) (33 lines)

The maid Bromia comes out. She relates how Alcumena has given birth to the sound of thunder and a voice from heaven. She finds Amphitruo lying on the ground, stunned by lightning. She informs him that Alcumena has had twins.

- Act 5.1 (cont.) (1086–1130): trochaic septenarii (45 lines)

Bromia tells Amphitruo that his wife is certainly chaste, in view of the thunder, the fact that she gave birth without pain, and the fact that one of the twins had killed two snakes sent to kill him.

=== Jupiter explains ===
- Act 5.2 (1131–1143): iambic senarii (13 lines)

Jupiter appears in his own form, and tells Amphitruo that his wife is blameless.

- Act 5.2 (cont.) (1144–1146): trochaic septenarii (3 lines)

Amphitruo accepts Jupiter's explanation and says he will drop his plan to consult the prophet Teiresias.

== Adaptations ==
The plot of Amphitryon was adapted in the 1550s into Jack Juggler, one of the earliest examples of English comedy.

The Birth of Hercules (c. 1600 – c. 1610) is an English adaptation of Amphitryon intended for an academic audience, possibly at the University of Cambridge.

In 1621 the German poet laureate Joannes Burmeister published a Neo-Latin adaptation, titled Mater-Virgo (The Virgin Mother), about the Nativity of Jesus. In it Amphitryon became Joseph, Alcmena became the Virgin Mary, and Sosia became the angel Gabriel. The last known copy of the book went missing from the Berlin library in World War II and exists now only in fragments.

== Translations ==
- Henry Thomas Riley, 1912
- Paul Nixon, 1916
- Sir Robert Allison, 1942
- E. F. Watling, 1964
- Paul Roche, 1968
- Constance Carrier 1970
- Lionel Casson 1971
- David Christenson 2008 Review in Bryn Mawr Classical Review
- Prof. Jerry Respeto, 2009
- Wolfang de Melo, 2011
- David M. Christenson, 2000. Titus Maccius Plautus: Amphitruo (Cambridge).
