= Amphitryon =

Figure in Greek mythology, husband of Alcmene

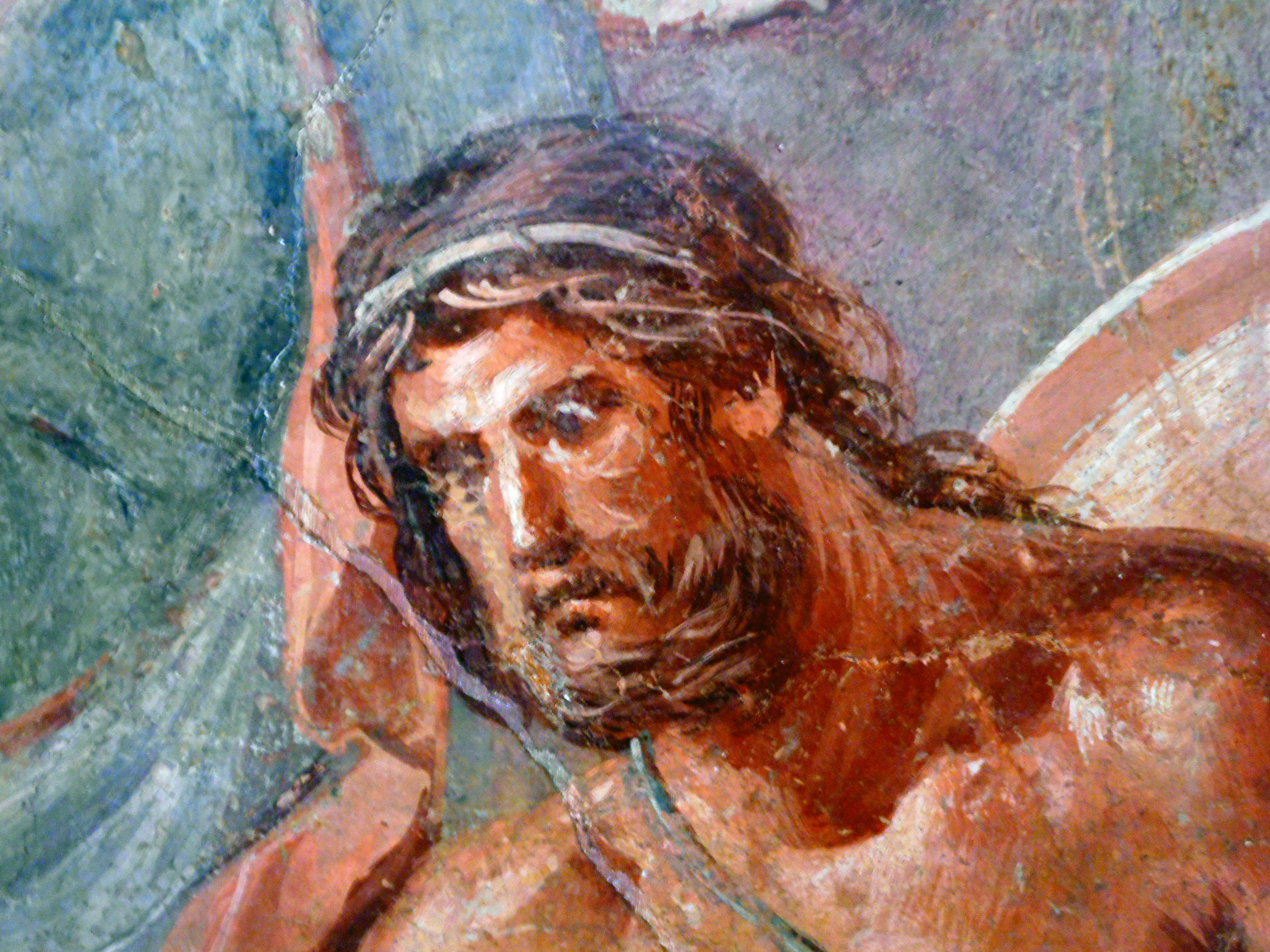
Amphitryon, detail of an antique Roman fresco from Herculaneum.

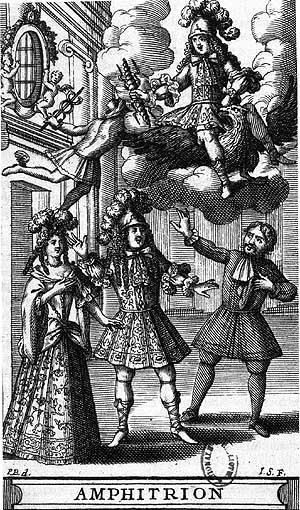
Frontispiece of the 1682 edition of Molière's highly successful comedy Amphitryon, based on a Plautine comic treatment of the myth of the eponymous hero: the gods Jupiter (Zeus), disguised as Amphitryon and mounted upon an eagle, and Mercury (Hermes) descend from Olympus to meddle in the affairs of the play's human characters.

Amphitryon (/æmˈfɪtriən/; Ancient Greek: Ἀμφιτρύων, gen.: Ἀμφιτρύωνος, romanized: Amphitruo or Amphitrúōn, lit. 'harassing either side' or 'disputing on both sides'), in Greek mythology, was a son of Alcaeus, king of Tiryns in Argolis. His mother was named either Astydameia, the daughter of Pelops and Hippodamia, or Laonome, daughter of Guneus, or else Hipponome, daughter of Menoeceus. Amphitryon was the brother of Anaxo (wife of Electryon), and Perimede, wife of Licymnius. He was a husband of Alcmene, Electryon's daughter, and stepfather of the Greek hero Heracles.

== Mythology ==
Born—according to tradition—in Tiryns, in Argolis in the eastern part of the Peloponnese, Amphitryon became King of Troezen and regent of Mycenae. He was a friend of Panopeus.

Having accidentally killed his prospective father-in-law, Electryon, king of Mycenae, Amphitryon was driven out of Mycenae by Electryon's brother, Sthenelus. However, there is an earlier tradition that Amphitryon killed Electryon in a fit of anger over some cattle. He fled with Alcmene to Thebes, where he was cleansed from the guilt of blood by Creon, king of Thebes.

Alcmene, who was pregnant and had been betrothed to Amphitryon by her father, refused to marry him until he had avenged the deaths of her brothers, all but one of whom had fallen in battle against the Taphians. (It was on his return from this expedition that Electryon had been killed.) Amphitryon accordingly took the field against the Taphians, accompanied by Creon, who had agreed to assist him on condition that he slew the Teumessian fox which had been sent by Dionysus to ravage the Theban countryside.

The Taphians, however, remained invincible until Comaetho, the king's daughter, out of love for Amphitryon, plucked out the single golden hair of her father, Pterelaos, the possession of which had rendered him immortal. Having defeated the enemy, Amphitryon put Comaetho to death and handed over the kingdom of the Taphians to Cephalus. On his return to Thebes he married Alcmene, who gave birth to twin sons, Iphicles and Heracles. Only Iphicles was the son of Amphitryon - in a case of heteropaternal superfecundation, Heracles was the son of Zeus, who had visited Alcmene during Amphitryon's absence. Zeus, disguised as Amphitryon, described the victory over the sons of Pterelaus in such convincing detail that Alcmene accepted him as her betrothed. Amphitryon and Alcmene also had a daughter named Laonome.

Amphitryon fell in battle against the Minyans, against whom he had undertaken an expedition, accompanied by the youthful Heracles, to deliver Thebes from a disgraceful tribute. In the play Heracles by Euripides, Amphitryon survives to witness the murders of Heracles' children and wife.

== Dramatic treatments ==
- Amphitryon was the title of a lost tragedy of Sophocles, but most others who have used this story have rendered comic treatments instead. Plautus, the Roman comedian, used this tale to present Amphitryon, a burlesque play. The dramatic treatment by Plautus has enjoyed a sustaining presence on the stage since its premiere. It was the only play by Plautus that was still performed during the Middle Ages, albeit in a modified form. It was staged regularly during the Renaissance, and was the second ancient comedy to be translated into the English language.
- Plautus' play inspired several other theatrical works during the 16th century, including three Spanish language plays, two Italian plays, and a comedy in Portuguese by Luís de Camões. In 1636 Jean Rotrou translated Plautus' work into a successful French language production, Les Deux Sosies. This work inspired Molière's highly successful Amphitryon (1668). From Molière's line "Le véritable Amphitryon est l'Amphitryon où l'on dîne," the name Amphitryon has come to be used in the sense of a generous entertainer, a good host; the Spanish word for "host" is in fact "anfitrión" and in Portuguese it is "anfitrião". Several other continental versions inspired by Plautus followed Molière, including a Christianized version by Johannes Burmeister.
- The first English language work that was loosely based on Plautus was an interlude in Jacke Juggler (ca. 1550). John Marston's What You Will (1607) was also partly based on Plautus. The first large scale work where Plautus was the chief source was Thomas Heywood's The Silver Age (1613). John Dryden's 1690 Amphitryon is based on Molière's 1668 version as well as on Plautus. Notable innovations from Dryden's adaptation include music by Henry Purcell and the character of Phaedra, who flirts with Sosia but is eventually won over by Mercury's promises of wealth. A modern comic adaptation was made by George Maxim Ross in the 1950s under the title Too Much Amphitryon.
- In Germany, Heinrich von Kleist's Amphitryon (1807), which began as a translation of Molière's Amphitryon (1668) but developed into an original adaptation of the myth in its own right, remains the most frequently performed version of the myth, with Kleist using Alkmene's inability to distinguish between Jupiter and her husband to explore metaphysical issues; Giselher Klebe wrote in 1961 his opera Alkmene based on this play. Other German dramatic treatments include Georg Kaiser's posthumously published Double Amphitryon (Zweimal Amphitryon, 1943) and Peter Hacks's Amphitryon (1968).
- In France, Molière's Amphitryon (1668) is the most famous and seminal treatment of the myth. It was also the subject of a play by Jean Giraudoux, Amphitryon 38 (1929), the number in the title being Giraudoux's whimsical approximation of how many times the story had been told onstage previously. It was adapted into English by S. N. Behrman and enjoyed a successful run on Broadway in 1938. Plautus' version was the basis of Cole Porter's 1950 musical Out of This World. In 1991 it was the basis for the Jean-Luc Godard film Hélas pour moi.
- The classic 1935 Nazi-era but anti-Nazi film version, Amphitryon, was based on Kleist.
- The comic opera Amfitrion by the Croatia composer Boris Papandopulo (composed in 1937) which premiered in 1940.
- The musical Olympus on My Mind is based on Kleist's adaptation of the play.
- Irish author John Banville's play God's Gift (Gallery Books, 2000) is a version of Kleist's Amphitryon.
- The late Mexican writer Ignacio Padilla's novel Amphitryon (2000), is a loose retelling of the ancient myth set in Nazi Germany and Europe, largely exploring the complex subjects of identity, time, and memory. The English translation is titled Shadow Without a Name (2003).

== Notes ==
Preceded by Electryon	King of Mycenae	Succeeded by Sthenelus
