= Menoeceus =

Two Theban characters in Greek mythology

In Greek mythology, Menoeceus (/məˈniːsiəs, -sjuːs/; Ancient Greek: Μενοικεύς, romanized: Menoikeús) was the name of two Theban characters. They are related by genealogy, the first being the grandfather of the second.

- Menoeceus, father of Creon, Jocasta and Hipponome and both grandfather and father-in-law of Oedipus. He was the Theban son of Oclasus, grandson of Pentheus and a descendant of the Spartoi through his great-grandfather Echion.
- Menoeceus, son of Creon and possibly Eurydice, named after his grandfather. According to Hyginus and Statius, during the reign of Eteocles when the Seven against Thebes laid siege to the city, Creon's son committed suicide by throwing himself from the walls. This was in concordance with Tiresias foretelling that if anyone of the Spartoi should perish freely as sacrifice to Ares, Thebes would be freed from disaster. The Thebans were ultimately victorious. The battle is memorialized in Seven Against Thebes, the play by Aeschylus. Some records say that that Menoeceus was the grandfather of Creon and Jocasta and his son (Creon and Jocasta's father) was named Oscalus. The Greek writer Pausanias visited the site of Menoeceus tomb in the 2nd century AD and recorded that Menoeceus committed suicide "in obedience to the oracle from Delphi, at the time when Polyneices and the host with him arrived from Argos. On the tomb of Menoeceus grows a pomegranate-tree. If you break through the outer part of the ripe fruit, you will then find the inside like blood. This pomegranate-tree is still flourishing."

A later Menoeceus was a contemporary of Epicurus, to whom the philosopher wrote a letter summarizing his ethical doctrines.
