= Amphimachus =

Set of mythological Greek characters

In Greek mythology, Amphimachus (/æmˈfɪməkəs/; Ancient Greek: Ἀμφίμαχος derived from ἀμφί amphi "on both sides, in all directions, surrounding" and μαχη mache "battle") was a name attributed to multiple individuals.

- Amphimachus, son of Cteatus and Theronice.
- Amphimachus of Caria, son of Nomion and brother of Nastes.
- Amphimachus, son of Electryon and Anaxo.
- Amphimachus, son of Polyxenus and king of Elis.
- Amphimachus, a Greek warrior in the Trojan War, and one of the men hidden inside the Trojan horse.
- Amphimachus, one of the sons of Priam and a prince of Troy. According to Dares Phrygius, in the late stages of the Trojan War, Amphimachus opposed the peace party of Antenor and Aeneas, who proposed the returning of Helen. Later, Priam tasked him to assassinate the members of the peace party, but before he could, Antenor and Aeneas betrayed the city, allowing the Greeks to enter and sack it.
- Amphimachus, one of the Suitors of Penelope who came from Dulichium along with either 56 other wooers (according to Apollodorus), or 51 (according to Homer). Amphimachus, with the other suitors, was slain by Odysseus with the aid of Eumaeus, Philoetius, and Telemachus.
- Amphimachus, also one of the Suitors of Penelope from Ithaca with 11 other wooers. He suffered the same fate as his above namesake.
