= Pterelaus (son of Taphius) =

In Greek mythology, Pterelaus (/ˌtɛrəˈleɪəs/; Ancient Greek: Πτερέλαος, romanized: Pterelaos, lit. 'wings of the people') was a king of the Taphians.

== Family ==
Pterelaus was the son of Taphius and thus, the grandson of the first Pterelaus. Another account makes Taphius the son of Poseidon and Hippothoë, making him grandson of them and a descendant of the Argive hero Perseus.

Pterelaus was the father of several sons: Chromius, Tyrannus, Antiochus, Chersidamas, Mestor, Everes and a daughter named Comaetho.

== Mythology ==
The god Poseidon had caused to grow upon his head a single magic golden hair which, so long as it continued to grow there, made him immortal and unconquerable. Pterelaus and his kin raided the cattle of the king of Mycenae; but he was killed in a retaliatory expedition led by Amphitryon (later the stepfather of Heracles) after being betrayed by Comaetho, who had fallen in love with Amphitryon and pulled out the golden hair from her father's head, rendering him defenceless. The vanquished Taphian realm was handed over to Amphitryon's allies, including Cephalus. Cephalus ruled over many islands, and his followers became known as Cephallenians. Odysseus was a descendant of Cephalus by the following lineage: Cephalus - Arcesius - Laërtes - Odysseus.

In one version of the myth of Cephalus' death, he is said to have committed suicide by jumping off Cape Leucas not out of remorse for the death of his wife Procris, but out of remorse for the death of Pterelaus, whom he also loved.
