= Alcaeus (mythology) =

Ancient Greek mythological figure

In Greek mythology, Alcaeus (/ælˈsiːəs/; Ancient Greek: Ἀλκαῖος, romanized: Alkaios, lit. 'strong' or 'mighty') was the name of a number of different people:

- Alcaeus, was a Mycenaean prince. He was a son of Perseus and Andromeda and thus the brother of Perses, Heleus, Mestor, Sthenelus, Electryon, Cynurus, Gorgophone and Autochthe. Alcaeus was married either to Astydameia, the daughter of Pelops and Hippodamia, or Laonome, daughter of Guneus, or else Hipponome, daughter of Menoeceus, by whom he became the father of Amphitryon, Anaxo and Perimede.
- Alcaeus, the original name of Heracles (according to Diodorus Siculus), which was given to him on account of his descent from Alcaeus, the son of Perseus mentioned above.
- Alcaeus, a son of Heracles by a female slave of Iardanus, from whom the dynasty of the Heraclids in Lydia were believed to be descended. Diodorus Siculus writes that this son of Heracles is named "Cleolaus".
- Alcaeus, a Cretan general of Rhadamanthus, according to Diodorus Siculus, who presented him with the island of Paros. The Bibliotheca relates that he was a son of Androgeus (the son of Minos and Pasiphaë) and brother of Sthenelus, and that when Heracles, on his expedition to fetch the girdle of Ares, which was in the possession of the queen of the Amazons, arrived at Paros, some of his companions were slain by the sons of Minos. Heracles, in his anger, slew all the descendants of Minos except Alcaeus and Sthenelus, whom he took with him, and to whom he afterwards gave the island of Thasus as their home.
- Alcaeus, son of Margasus and Phyllis, a Carian ally of the Trojans in the Trojan War. He was killed by Meges.
