= Alcmene =

Mother of Heracles

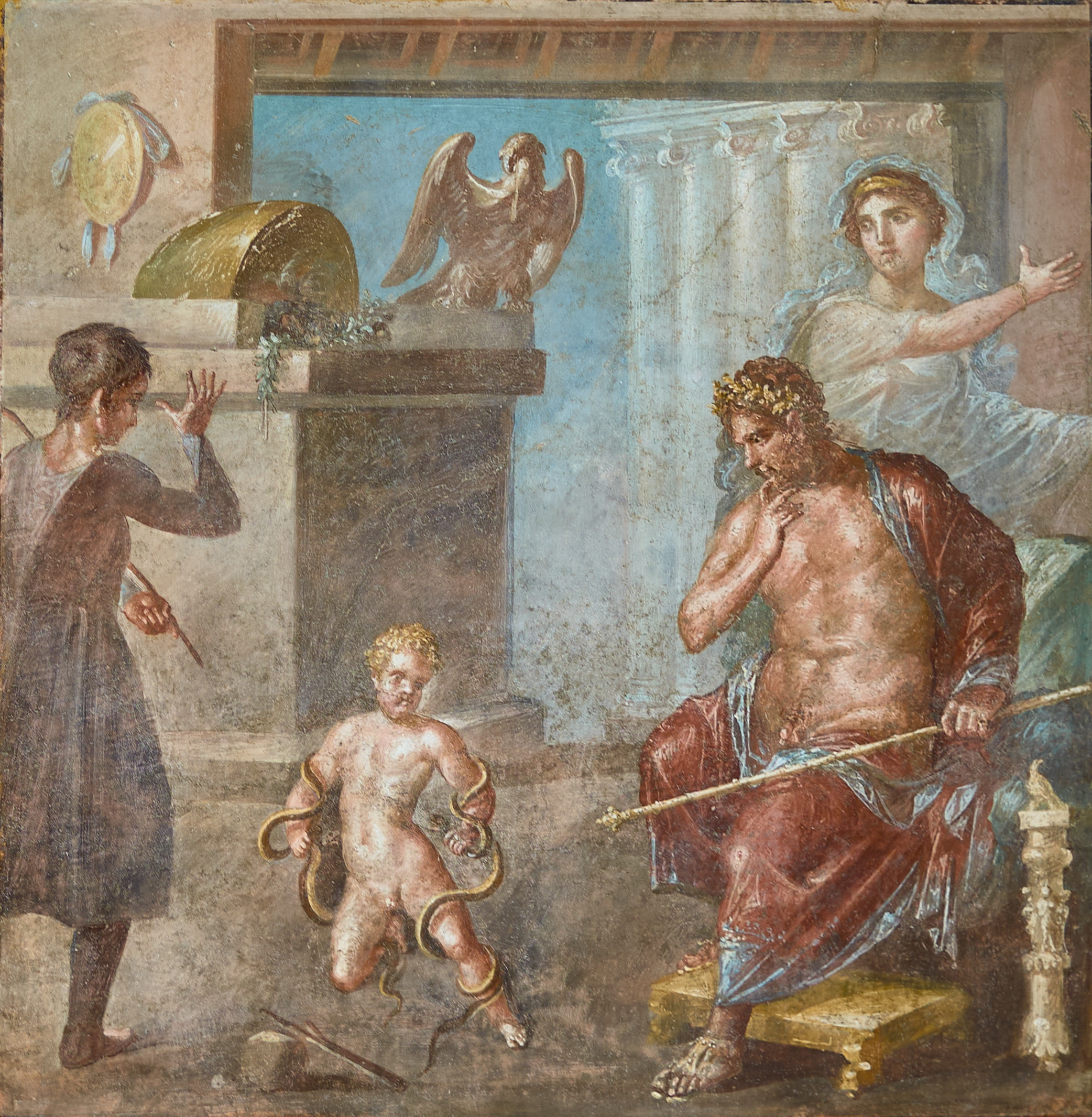
Alcmene watching Heracles strangle the snakes on a Roman fresco from House of the Vetti (Pompeii).

In Greek mythology, Alcmene (/ælkˈmiːniː/ alk-MEE-nee; Attic Greek: Ἀλκμήνη, romanized: Alkmḗnē) or Alcmena (/ælkˈmiːnə/ alk-MEE-nə; Doric Greek: Ἀλκμάνα, romanized: Alkmána; Latin: Alcumena; meaning "strong in wrath") was the wife of Amphitryon, by whom she bore two children, Iphicles and Laonome. She is best known as the mother of Heracles, whose father was the god Zeus. Alcmene was also referred to as Electryone (Ἠλεκτρυώνη, Elektryṓnē), a patronymic name as a daughter of Electryon.

== Mythology ==
=== Background ===
According to the Bibliotheca, Alcmene was born to Electryon, the son of Perseus and Andromeda, and king of Tiryns and Mycenae or Medea in Argolis. Her mother was Anaxo, daughter of Alcaeus and Astydamia. Other accounts say her mother was Lysidice, the daughter of Pelops and Hippodameia, or Eurydice, the daughter of Pelops. According to Pausanias, the poet Asius made Alcmene the daughter of Amphiaraus and Eriphyle.

Hesiod describes Alcmene as the tallest, most beautiful woman with wisdom surpassed by no person born of mortal parents. It is said that her face and dark eyes were as charming as Aphrodite's, and that she honoured her husband like no woman before her.

=== Exile to Thebes ===
According to the Bibliotheca, Alcmene went with Amphitryon to Thebes, where he was purified by Creon for accidentally killing Electryon. Alcmene refused to marry Amphitryon until he had avenged the death of her brothers. During Amphitryon's expedition against the Taphians and Teleboans, when Zeus desired to sleep with Alcmene, he made one night last longer, extending it to three, by ordering Helios, the sun god, not to rise for three whole days. He then visited Alcmene disguised as Amphitryon. Zeus persuaded Alcmene that he was her husband. Thus Zeus slept with Alcmene, his great-granddaughter, thereby conceiving Heracles, while recounting Amphitryon's victories against the Teleboans. When Amphitryon finally returned to Thebes, Alcmene told him that he had come the night before and slept with her; he learned from Tiresias what Zeus had done.

=== Birth of Heracles ===
==== Homer ====
In Homer's Iliad, when Alcmene was about to give birth to Heracles, Zeus announced to all the gods that on that day a child by Zeus himself would be born and rule all those around him. Hera, after requesting Zeus to swear an oath to that effect, descended from Olympus to Argos and made the wife of Sthenelus (son of Perseus) give birth to Eurystheus after only seven months, while at the same time preventing Alcmene from delivering Heracles. This resulted in the fulfillment of Zeus's oath in that it was Eurystheus rather than Heracles.

==== Ovid ====
According to Ovid's Metamorphoses, while in labour, Alcmene was having great difficulty giving birth to such a large child. After seven days and nights of agony, Alcmene stretched out her arms and called upon Lucina, the goddess of childbirth (the Roman equivalent of Eileithyia). While Lucina did go to Alcmene, she had been previously instructed by Juno (Hera) to prevent the delivery. With her hands clasped and legs crossed, Lucina muttered charms, thereby preventing Alcmene from giving birth. Alcmene writhed in pain, cursed the heavens, and came close to death. Galanthis, a maid of Alcmene who was nearby, observed Lucina's behaviour and quickly deduced that it was Juno's doing. To put an end to her mistress's suffering, she announced that Alcmene had safely delivered her child, which surprised Lucina so much that she immediately jumped up and unclenched her hands. As soon as Lucina leapt up, Alcmene was released from her spell, and gave birth to Heracles. As punishment for deceiving Lucina, Galanthis was transformed into a weasel; she continued to live with Alcmene.

==== Pausanias ====
In Pausanias' recounting, Hera sent witches (as they were called by the Thebans) to hinder Alcmene's delivery of Heracles. The witches were successful in preventing the birth until Historis, daughter of Tiresias, thought of a trick to deceive the witches. Like Galanthis, Historis announced that Alcmene had delivered her child; having been deceived, the witches went away, allowing Alcmene to give birth.

==== Plautus ====
In contrast to the depictions of a difficult labor above, an alternative version is presented in Amphitryon, a comedic play by Plautus. Here Alcmene calls upon Jupiter, who performs a miracle allowing her to give birth quickly and without pain. After a crash of thunder and light, the baby arrives without anyone's assistance.

=== Death ===
After the death of Amphitryon, Alcmene married Rhadamanthys, son of Zeus, and lived with him in exile at Ocaleae in Boeotia. It is said that after Heracles was apotheosised, Hyllus, having pursued and killed Eurystheus, cut off Eurystheus' head and gave it to Alcmene, who gouged out the eyes with weaving pins. In Metamorphoses, an aging Alcmene recounted the story of the birth of Heracles to Iole.

There are two accounts of Alcmene's death. In the first, according to the Megarians, Alcmene was walking from Argos to Thebes when she died at Megara. The Heracleidae fell into disagreement about where to take Alcmene's body, with some wishing to take her corpse back to Argos, and others wishing to take it to Thebes to be buried with Amphitryon and Heracles' children by Megara. However, the god in Delphi gave the Heracleidae an oracle that it was better to bury Alcmene in Megara. In the second account given by the Thebans, when Alcmene died, she was turned from human form to a stone.

Pausanias indicated that an altar to Alcmene had been built in the Cynosarges in Athens, alongside altars to Heracles, Hebe, and Iolaus. Pausanias also said that Alcmene's tomb is located near the Olympieum at Megara.
