= Taphians =

Island group of Ionian Sea, Greece

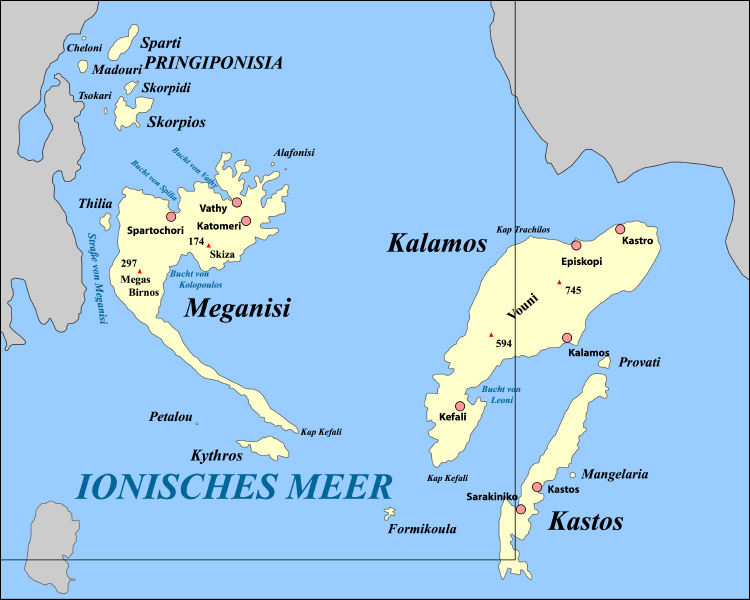
Map of the Tilevoides

In Homeric Greece, the islands of Taphos /ˈteɪˌfɒs/ (Τάφος) lay in the Ionian Sea off the coast of Acarnania in northwestern Greece, home of seagoing and piratical inhabitants, the Taphians /ˈteɪfiənz/ (Τάφιοι). Penelope mentions the Taphian sea-robbers when she rebukes the chief of her suitors. Athena is disguised as Mentes, "lord of the Taphian men who love their oars", who accepts the hospitality of Telemachus and speeds him on his journey from Ithaca to Pylos. Although the Taphians dealt in slaves, their piratical activities weren't always seen as immoral. In the heroic age, piracy (leisteia) was a legitimate means of acquiring resources. Beyond slaves, the Taphians played a crucial role in the trade of metals, and in the context of the transition from Bronze to Iron, control over the distribution of iron—the new strategic metal for weapons and tools—granted the Taphians disproportionate power relative to their limited territorial base.

By the time of Euripides, the islands were identified with the Echinades: in Euripides' Iphigeneia at Aulis (405 BCE), the chorus of women from Chalcis have spied the Hellenes' fleet and seen Eurytus who "led the Taphian warriors with the white oar-blades, the subjects of Meges, son of Phyleus, who had left the isles of the Echinades, where sailors cannot land." Modern scholars, such as the editors of the Barrington Atlas of the Greek and Roman World, identify the island of Taphos as the island of Meganisi just east of the larger island Lefkada (Leucas).

The Taphians accounted themselves the descendants of Perseus, for the mother of Taphius, their eponymous colonizer, was a granddaughter of Perseus and lay with Poseidon to beget the heroic founder. Another tradition holds that Taphius was one of the Leleges, and grandson of Lelex. Their most noted king was Pterelaos, rendered immortal by Poseidon by the single golden hair among the hairs of his head, but undone by his faithless daughter (Comaetho) who plucked it while he slept, so that the Mycenaean adventurer Amphitryon of Tiryns could overcome and kill him and retrieve the cattle Pterelaos' sons had rustled from Mycenae, along with many spoils besides. As he was returning with his spoils to his bride at Thebes, Zeus preceded him by one night: taking Amphitryon's shape, and brandishing a Taphian cup as a sign of his success, the king of gods fathered Heracles.

They are often identified with the Tilevoides (Τηλεβόιδες), islands in the Ionian Sea.

== Sources ==
- Richard Talbert. Barrington Atlas of the Greek and Roman World, p. 54. ISBN 0-691-03169-X
