= Ithacus =

In Greek mythology, Ithacus (Ancient Greek: Ἴθακος, romanized: Ithakos, lit. 'fierce' or 'sharp') may refer to two different characters:

- Ithacus, son of King Pterelaus of the Teleboans and Amphimede, and a descendant of Zeus. Originally from Cephallenia, Ithacus together with his brothers Neritus and Polyctor decided to leave their homeland to preserve their own way of life. They were drawn to a nearby island, choosing it as the perfect site for a new colony because of its towering mountains offered excellent natural protection. After establishing their settlement, the local geography was named in their honour: the island itself became Ithaca, named after Ithacus; the prominent peak nearby was named Mount Neritus, after Neritus; and a third landmark, Polyctorium, took its name from their brother, Polyctor. These brothers were also said to have made a basin of stone in Ithaca into which a spring ran.
- Ithacus, one of the Suitors of Penelope who came from Same along with other 22 wooers. He, with the other suitors, was shot dead by Odysseus with the assistance of Eumaeus, Philoetius, and Telemachus.
