= Teleboas (mythology) =

Various mythological Greek characters

In Greek mythology, Teleboas (/təˈlɛboʊəs/; Ancient Greek: Τηλεβόας means 'shouting afar') may refer to the following figures:

- Teleboas, an Arcadian prince as one of the 50 sons of the impious King Lycaon either by the naiad Cyllene, Nonacris or by unknown woman. He and his brothers were the most nefarious and carefree of all people. To test them, Zeus visited them in the form of a peasant. These brothers mixed the entrails of a child into the god's meal, whereupon the enraged Zeus threw the meal over the table. Teleboas was killed, along with his brothers and their father, by a lightning bolt of the god.
- Teleboas, a son of Pterelaus (son of Lelex) and brother of Taphius. In some accounts, he was instead called the son of a daughter of Lelex and had 22 sons who dwelt in Leucas. Teleboas' descendants, the Teleboans, were believed to have settled in Acarnania.
- Teleboas, a centaur who fought against the Lapiths at Pirithous' wedding. He was killed by Nestor.
