= Pterelaus (son of Lelex) =

Son of Lelex

In Greek mythology, Pterelaus (/ˌtɛrəˈleɪəs/; Ancient Greek: Πτερέλαος, romanized: Pterelaos, lit. 'wings of the people') was the son of Lelex, the pre-Hellenic king of Megara whose descendants (the Leleges) spread across Greece and beyond. Thus, he was the possible brother of Bias and Cleson.

== Mythology ==
Pterelaus ruled the land by the River Achelous, in the region later called Acarnania. Pterelaus had numerous sons who settled the territory in the vicinity of the Achelous, including the nearby islands of the Ionian Sea. By Amphimede, his sons Ithacus, Neritus, and Polyctor colonized the island of Ithaca (which took the name of one of his sons) and, in addition to Ithaca itself, founded the places on Ithaca named Neritum and Polyctorium. Taphius and Teleboas were also numbered among Pterelaus's sons, and founded the Taphian and Teleboan tribes.
