= Mycenae =

Archaeological site in Greece

- Μυκῆναι (Ancient Greek); Μυκήνη (Ancient Greek); Μυκήνες (Ancient Greek)
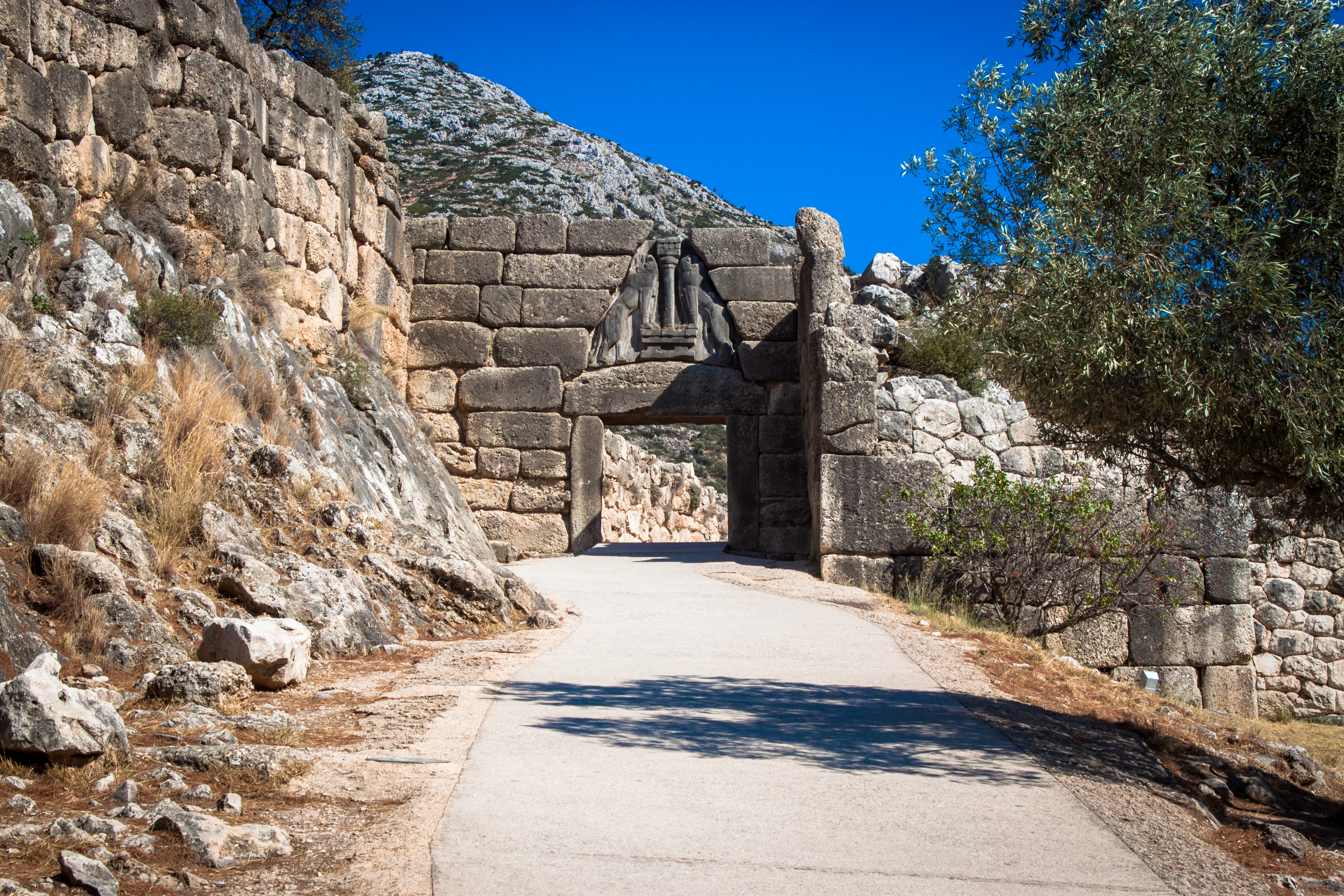
- The Lion Gate and example of Cyclopean masonry at Mycenae

- Location within Greece
- 37°43′49″N 22°45′27″E
- Type: Settlement
- Periods: Bronze Age
- Cultures: Mycenaean Greece, Archaic Greece, Classical Greece
- Location: Argolis, Greece

History
- Built: c. 2100 BC
- Abandoned: 468 BC
- Event: Late Bronze Age collapse

Site notes
- Archaeologists: Francesco Grimani
- Condition: Partly buried

UNESCO World Heritage Site
- Official name: Archaeological Sites of Mycenae and Tiryns
- Type: Cultural
- Criteria: i, ii, iii, iv, vi
- Designated: 1999 (23rd session)
- Reference no.: 941
- Region: Europe and North America

Mycenae (/maɪˈsiːni/ my-SEE-nee; Ancient Greek: Μυκῆναι or Μυκήνη, Mykē̂nai or Mykḗnē) is an archaeological site near Mykines in Argolis, north-eastern Peloponnese, Greece. It is located about 120 kilometres (75 miles) south-west of Athens; 11 kilometres (7 miles) north of Argos; and 48 kilometres (30 miles) south of Corinth. The site is 19 kilometres (12 miles) inland from the Saronic Gulf and built upon a hill rising 274 metres (899 feet) above sea level.

In the second millennium BC, Mycenae was one of the major centres of Greek civilization—a military stronghold which dominated much of southern Greece, Crete, the Cyclades and parts of southwest Anatolia. The period of Greek history from about 1600 BC to about 1100 BC is called Mycenaean in reference to Mycenae. At its peak in 1350 BC, the citadel and lower town had a population of 30,000 and an area of 32 hectares (79 acres).

The first correct identification of Mycenae in modern literature was in 1700, during a survey conducted by the Venetian engineer Francesco Vandeyk on behalf of Francesco Grimani, the Provveditore Generale of the Kingdom of the Morea. Vandeyk used Pausanias's description of the Lion Gate to identify the ruins of Mycenae.

In 1999 the archeological site of Mycenae was added to the UNESCO World Heritage List, along with the nearby site of Tiryns, citing its historical importance as the center of the Mycenaean civilization, its outstanding architecture and its testimony to the development of Ancient Greek civilization. Noteworthy architecture includes the Lion Gate, the Treasury of Atreus and the walls of Mycenae and Tiryns.

These sites are strongly connected to the Homeric epics. The earliest examples of the Greek language are also visible at Mycenae and Tiryn, preserved on Linear B tablets.

== Etymology ==
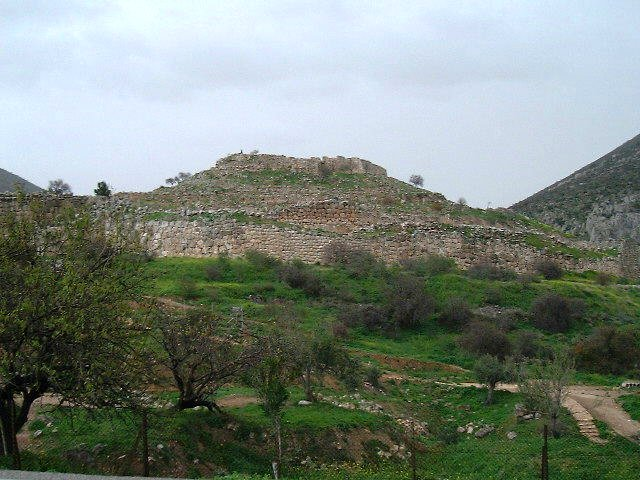
A view of the citadel

The name Mukanai is thought not to be Greek but rather one of the many pre-Greek place names inherited by later Greek speakers. Legend has it that the name was connected to the Greek word mykēs (μύκης, "mushroom"). Thus Pausanias ascribes the name to the legendary founder, Perseus, who was said to have named it either after the cap (mykēs) of the sheath of his sword or after a mushroom he had plucked on the site. Homer connected the name to the nymph Mycene, the daughter of the river god Inachos of Argos (Odyssey 2.120).

In the Iliad the name of the city is spelled Mykḗnē (Μυκήνη).

== History ==
Mycenae, an acropolis site, was built on a hill 900 feet (274 metres) above sea level, some 19 kilometres (12 miles) inland from the Gulf of Argolis. Situated in the north-east corner of the Argive plain, it easily overlooked the whole area and was ideally positioned to be a centre of power, especially as it commanded all easy routes to the Isthmus of Corinth. Besides its strong defensive and strategic position, it had good farmland and an adequate water supply.

=== Neolithic Age ===
There are only faint traces of Neolithic settlement on the site although it was continuously occupied from the Early Neolithic (EN, c. 5000–c. 4000 BC). EN Rainbow Ware constitutes the earliest ceramic evidence discovered so far.

=== Early Bronze Age ===
The Early Bronze Age (EBA) is known as the Early Helladic (EH) on mainland Greece, dated from around 3200-2050/2000 BC. The EH can be subdivided into EH I (3200-2650 BC), EH II (2650-2200 BC) and EH III (2200-2000 BC). Mycenae was occupied throughout this period.

Pottery material spanning the entire Early Helladic was discovered 1877 by Panagiotis Stamatakis at a low depth in the sixth shaft grave in Circle A. Further EH and MH material was found beneath the walls and floors of the palace, on the summit of the acropolis and outside the Lion Gate in the area of the ancient cemetery. An EH–MH settlement was discovered near a fresh-water well on top of the Kalkani hill south-west of the acropolis.

=== Middle Bronze Age ===
The Middle Bronze Age (MBA) is known as the Middle Helladic (MH) on mainland Greece, dated from around 2050/2000-1550 BC. At Mycenae the population grew considerably during the MH. In 1876, archeological digs conducted by Heinrich Schliemann found shaft grave evidence for extensive Cretan influence (Minoan) in the region from c. 1600 BC. Schliemann's shaft graves came to be known as Circle A to distinguish them from the Circle B graves, which were found at a later date, although Circle B are the earlier graves, dated c. 1650 BC to c. 1550 BC and entirely within MHIII. Circle A is dated to the sixteenth century BC, including the transition from Middle to Late Helladic IA (LHIA; c. 1550 – c. 1500 BC). The contents of Circle B are less wealthy than those of Circle A.

In MH II (c. 1800 BC), the first burials in pits or cist graves are found on the west slope of the acropolis, which was at least partially enclosed by the earliest circuit wall.

=== Late Bronze Age ===
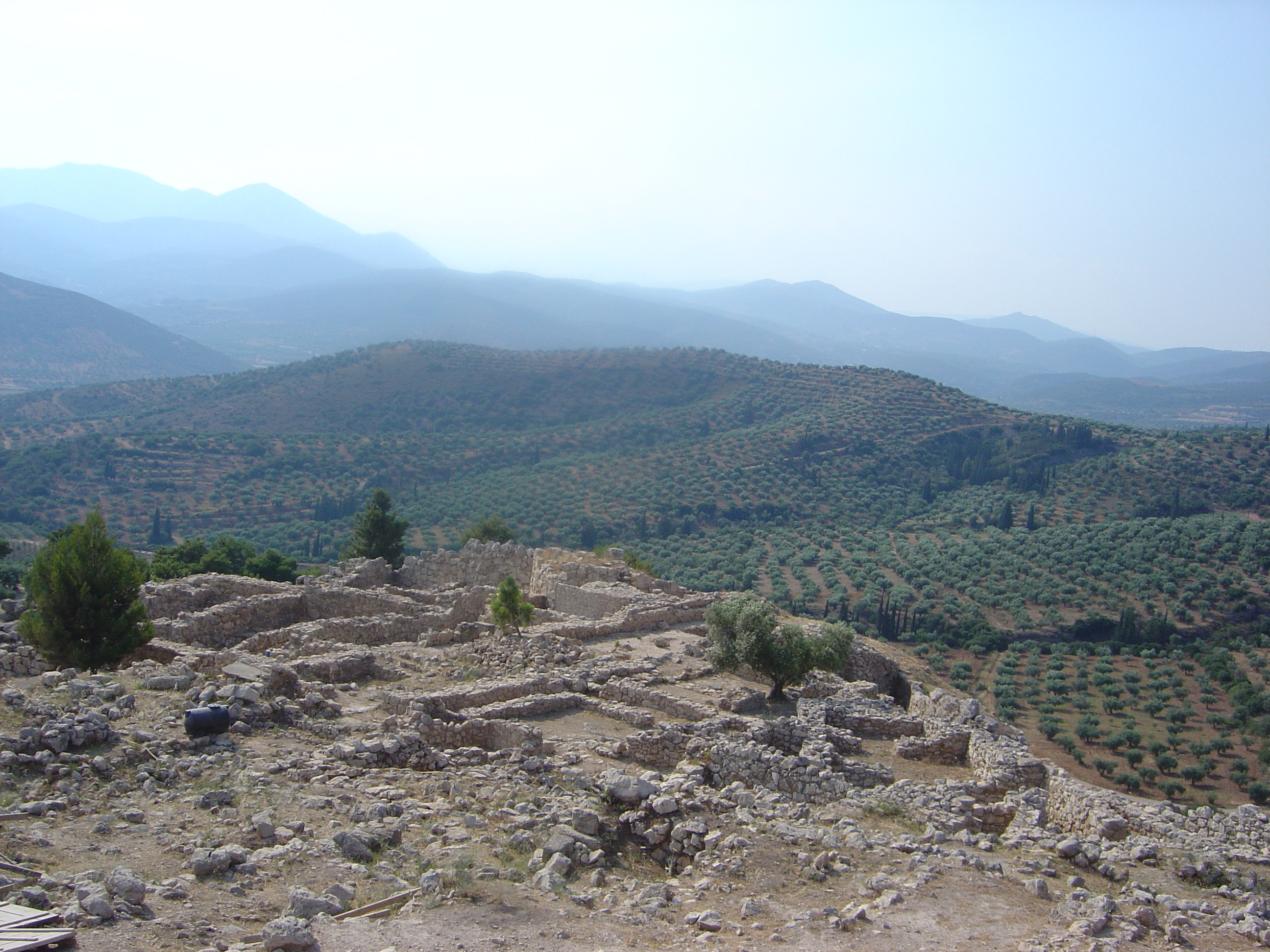
View from the acropolis, or high city

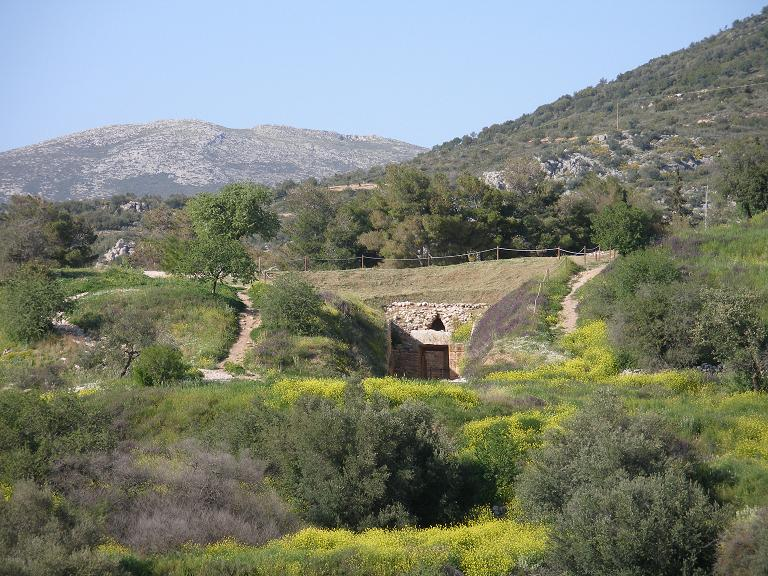
The Tomb of Aegisthus outside the walls of the citadel

The Late Bronze Age (LBA) is known as the Late Helladic (LH) on mainland Greece, dated from around 1550-1200/1150 BC.

In the absence of documents and objects that can be precisely dated, events at Mycenae can be dated only relatively within the constraints of Helladic chronology, which relies on categorisation of stratified material objects, mainly pottery, within an agreed historical framework. Mycenae developed into a major power during LHI (c. 1550 – c. 1450 BC) and is believed to have become the main centre of Aegean civilisation through the fifteenth century to the extent that the two hundred years from c. 1400 BC to c. 1200 BC (encompassing LHIIIA and LHIIIB) are known as the Mycenaean Age. The Minoan hegemony ended c. 1450 and there is evidence that Knossos was occupied by Mycenaeans until it too was destroyed c. 1370 BC. From then on, Mycenaean expansion throughout the Aegean was unhindered until the massive disruption of society in the first half of the twelfth century (LHIIIC), which ended Mycenaean civilisation and culminated in the destruction of Mycenae itself c. 1150 BC.

==== Late Helladic I (LHI; c. 1550–c. 1450 BC) ====
Outside the partial circuit wall, Grave Circle B, named for its enclosing wall, contained ten cist graves in Middle Helladic style and several shaft graves, sunk more deeply, with interments resting in cists. Richer grave goods mark the burials as possibly regal. Mounds over the top contained broken drinking vessels and bones from a repast, testifying to a more than ordinary farewell. Stelae surmounted the mounds.

A walled enclosure, Grave Circle A, included six more shaft graves, with nine female, eight male, and two juvenile interments. Grave goods were more costly than in Circle B. The presence of engraved and inlaid swords and daggers, with spear points and arrowheads, leaves little doubt that warrior chieftains and their families were buried here. Some art objects obtained from the graves are the Silver Siege Rhyton, the Mask of Agamemnon, the Cup of Nestor and weapons both votive and practical. The chemical compositions of the silver objects indicate that the silver was sourced from several locations.

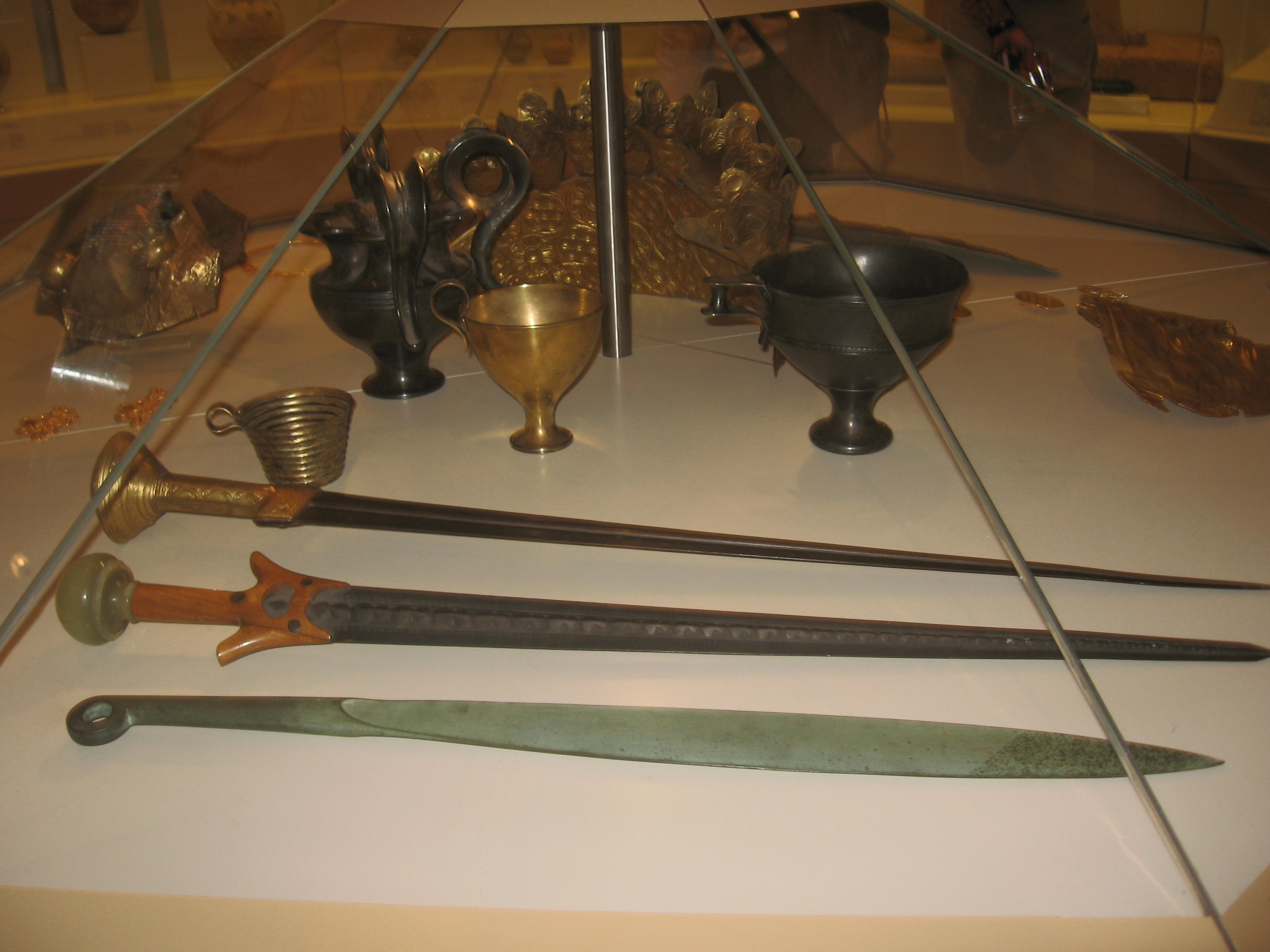
Museum replicas of Mycenaean swords and cups

==== Late Helladic II (LHII; c. 1450–c. 1400 BC) ====
Alan Wace divided the nine tholos tombs of Mycenae into three groups of three, each based on architecture. His earliest – the Cyclopean Tomb, Epano Phournos, and the Tomb of Aegisthus – are dated to LHIIA.

Burial in tholoi is seen as replacing burial in shaft graves. The care taken to preserve the shaft graves testifies that they were by then part of the royal heritage, the tombs of the ancestral heroes. Being more visible, all the tholoi had been plundered either in antiquity or in later historic times.

==== Late Helladic III (LHIII; c. 1400–c. 1050 BC) ====
At a conventional date of 1350 BC, the fortifications on the acropolis and other surrounding hills were rebuilt in a style known as Cyclopean because the blocks of stone used were so massive that they were thought in later ages to be the work of the one-eyed giants known as the Cyclopes. Within these walls, much of which can still be seen, successive monumental palaces were built. The final palace, remains of which are currently visible on the acropolis of Mycenae, dates to the start of LHIIIA:2. Earlier palaces must have existed but they had been cleared away or built over.

The construction of palaces at that time with a similar architecture was general throughout southern Greece. They all featured a megaron, or throne room, with a raised central hearth under an opening in the roof, which was supported by four columns in a square around the hearth. A throne was placed against the center of a wall to the side of the hearth, allowing an unobstructed view of the ruler from the entrance. Frescos adorned the plaster walls and floor.

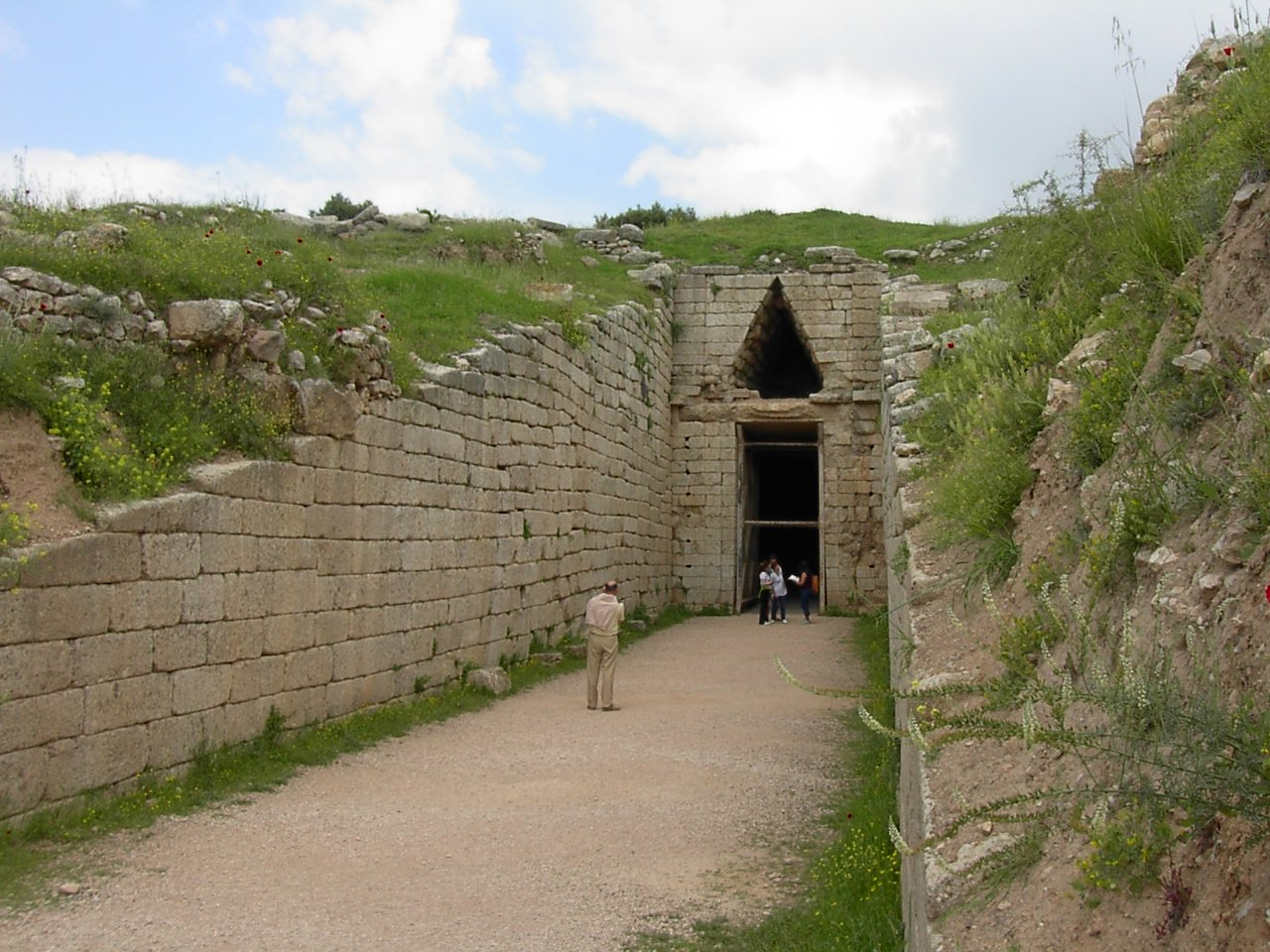
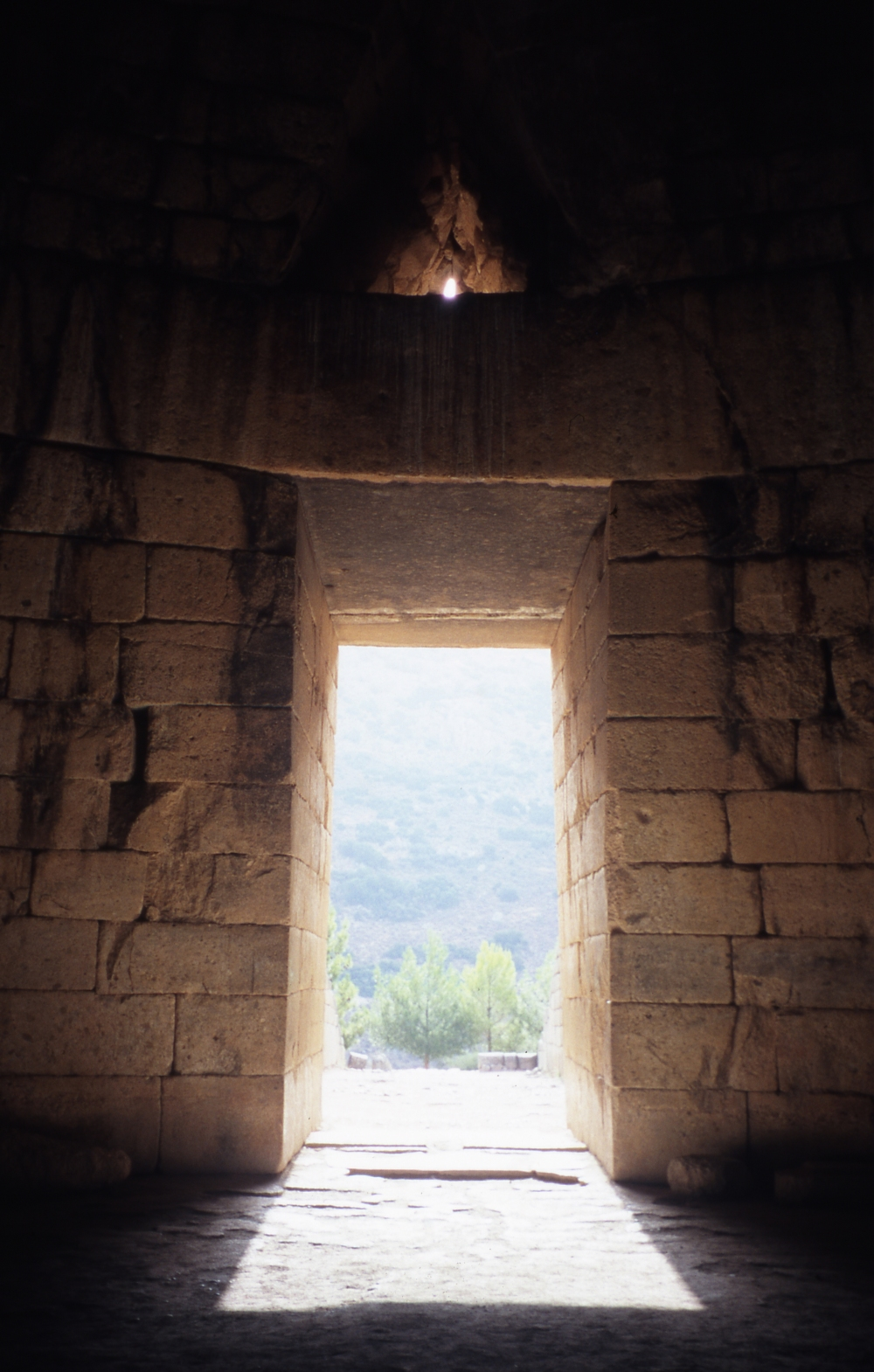
Examples of tholos, outside the citadel of Mycenae: tomb of Clytemnestra, outside view (left), Treasury of Atreus, inside view (right) .

The room was accessed from a courtyard with a columned portico. A grand staircase led from a terrace below to the courtyard on the acropolis.

In the temple built within the citadel, a scarab of Queen Tiye of Egypt, who was married to Amenhotep III, was placed in the Room of the Idols alongside at least one statue of either LHIIIA:2 or B:1 type. Amenhotep III's relations with m-w-k-i-n-u, *Mukana, have corroboration from the inscription at Kom al-Hetan - but Amenhotep's reign is thought to align with late LHIIIA:1. It is likely that Amenhotep's herald presented the scarab to an earlier generation, which then found the resources to rebuild the citadel as Cyclopean and then, to move the scarab here.

Wace's second group of tholoi are dated between LHIIA and LHIIIB: Kato Phournos, Panagia Tholos, and the Lion Tomb. The final group, Group III: the Treasury of Atreus, the Tomb of Clytemnestra and the Tomb of the Genii, are dated to LHIIIB by a sherd under the threshold of the Treasury of Atreus, the largest of the nine tombs. Like the Treasury of Minyas at Orchomenus the tomb had been looted of its contents and its nature as funerary monument had been forgotten. The structure bore the traditional name of "Treasury".

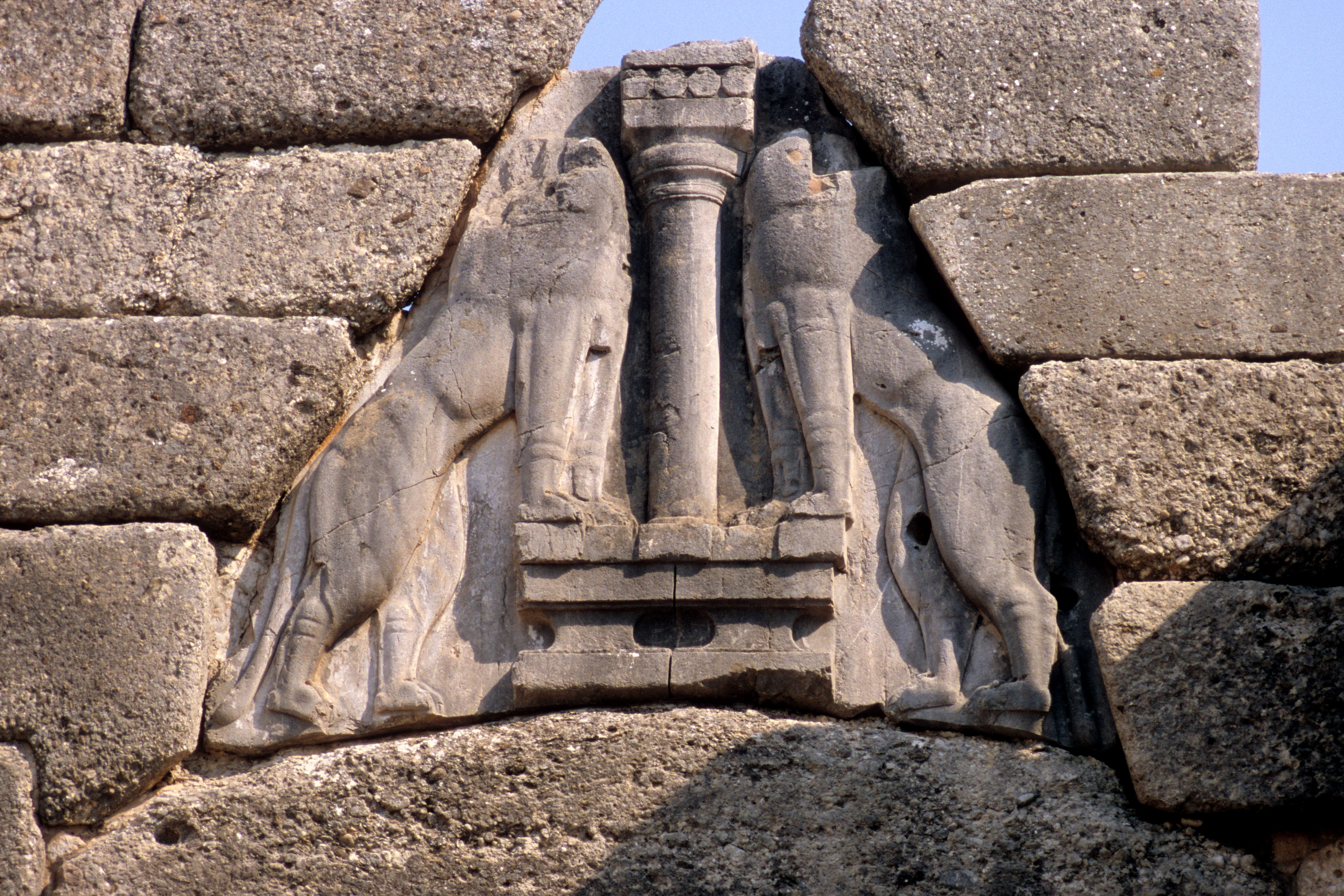
The Lion Gate (detail); two lions or lionesses flank the central column, whose significance is much debated.

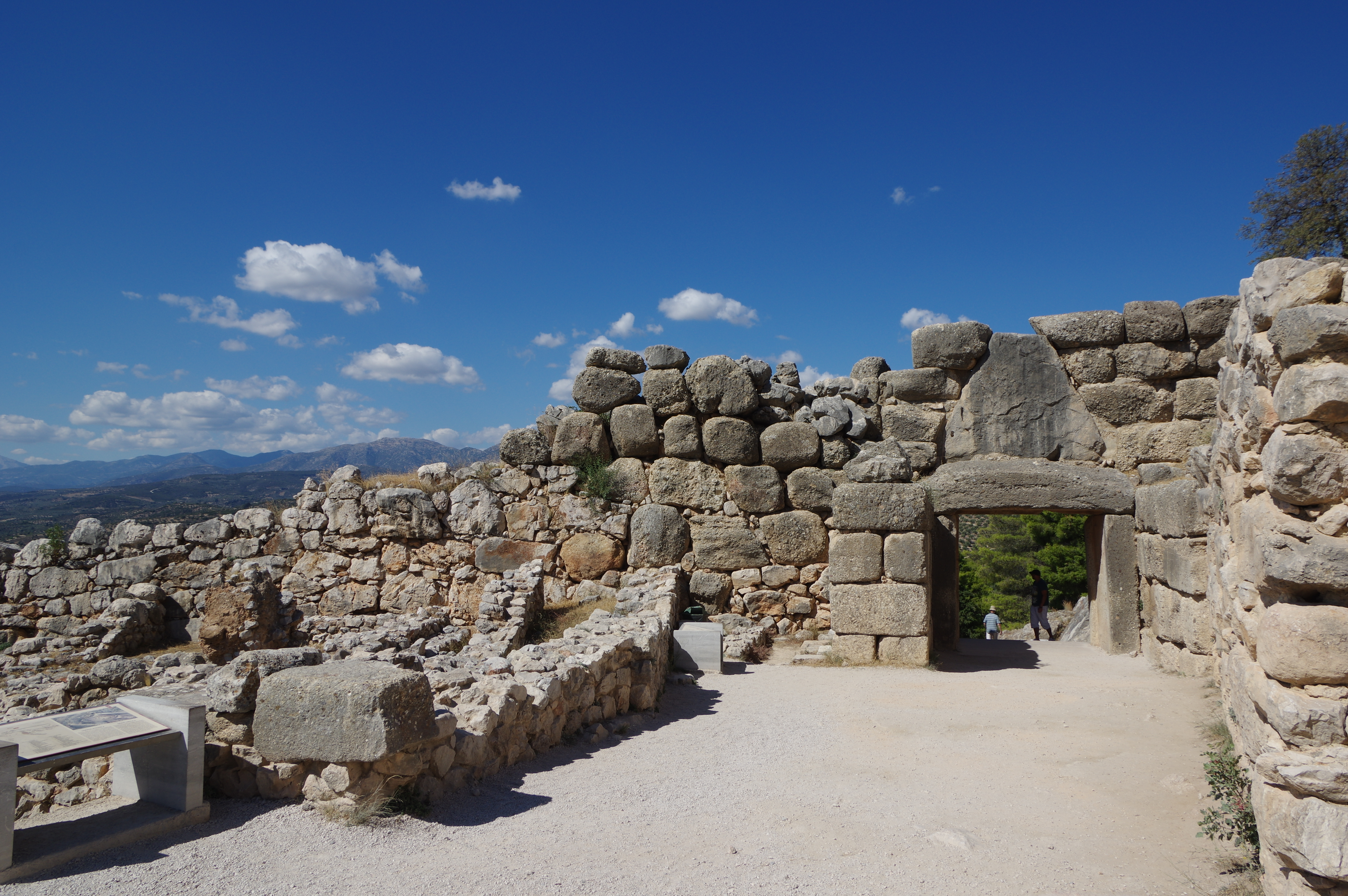
Cyclopean masonry, rear side of the Lion Gate

The pottery phases on which the relative dating scheme is based (EH, MH, LH, etc.) do not allow very precise dating, even augmented by the few existing C-14 dates due to the tolerance inherent in these. The sequence of further construction at Mycenae is approximately as follows. In the middle of LHIIIB, around 1250 BC or so, the Cyclopean wall was extended on the west slope to include Grave Circle A. The main entrance through the circuit wall was made grand by the best known feature of Mycenae, the Lion Gate, through which passed a stepped ramp leading past circle A and up to the palace. The Lion Gate was constructed in the form of a "Relieving Triangle" in order to support the weight of the stones. An undecorated postern gate also was constructed through the north wall.

One of the few groups of excavated houses in the city outside the walls lies beyond Grave Circle B and belongs to the same period. The House of Shields, the House of the Oil Merchant, the House of the Sphinxes, and the West House. These may have been both residences and workshops.

The largest stones including the lintels and gate jambs weighed well over 20 tonnes; some may have been close to 100 tonnes.

Somewhat later, toward the end of LHIIIB around 1200 BC, another, final extension to the citadel was undertaken. The wall was extended again on the northeast, with a sally port and also a secret passage through and under the wall, of corbelled construction, leading downwards by some 99 steps to a cistern carved out of rock 15 m below the surface. It was fed by a tunnel from a spring on more distant higher ground.

Already in LHIIIA:1, Egypt knew *Mukana by name as a capital city on the level of Thebes and Knossos. During LHIIIB, Mycenae's political, military and economic influence likely extended as far as Crete, Pylos in the western Peloponnese, and to Athens and Thebes.

=== Decline ===
Mycenae was among the numerous Aegean sites destroyed as part of the Bronze Age Collapse around 1200 BC. The causes of these destructions are unknown, but proposed explanations include enemy attack, internal strife, and natural disasters such as earthquakes. Unlike many other sites, Mycenae was partly rebuilt after this destruction, though it was no longer the centre of a centralised literate bureacuracy. Pottery finds suggest that Postpalatial Mycenae eventually regained some of its wealth, before burning once again. After this period, the site remained sparsely populated until the Hellenistic era.

=== Archaic and classical periods ===
A temple dedicated to Hera was built on the summit of the Mycenaean citadel during the Archaic Period. A Mycenaean contingent fought at Thermopylae and Plataea during the Persian Wars. In 468 BC, however, troops from Argos captured Mycenae, expelled the inhabitants and razed the fortifications.

=== Revival and abandonment ===
Mycenae was briefly reoccupied in the Hellenistic period, when it boasted a theatre (located over the Tomb of Clytemnestra). The site was subsequently abandoned, and by the Roman period in Greece its ruins had become a tourist attraction. The ancient travel writer Pausanias, for example, visited the site and briefly described the prominent fortifications and the Lion Gate, still visible in his time, the second century AD. Pausanias also describes being led to the site by shepherds, indicating that the surrounding area was never completely deserted.

The Ministry of Culture, Education, and Religious Affairs is currently in charge of the site. In 1999, a scientific committee for Mycenae was created, and has since completed numerous projects for the preservation, improvement, and stabilization of both archaeological sites. The committee has also sought to improve visitor access to the monuments at the locations by laying out walkways and establishing information stations.

== Political organization ==
It appears that the Mycenaean state was ruled by kings identified by the title 𐀷𐀙𐀏, wa-na-ka ("wanax") in the Linear B inscriptions at Knossos and Pylos. The wanax had the supreme authority and was represented by a number of officials. In the Homeric poems, the word form is anax (ἄναξ), often translated in English as "lord". Some inscriptions with a list of offerings indicate that the king was probably divine, but the term "for the king" is usually accompanied by another name. It is possible that a priest-king system was adopted from the East and the title probably indicates that his right to rule was given by the god. The term 𐀣𐀯𐀩𐀄, qa-si-re-u (cf. βασιλεύς, "basileús"), which was later used in Greece for "king", was apparently used for the "chief" of any group of people, or for a provincial official. (Homer mentions many basilees in Ithaca).

The land possessed by the king is usually called 𐀳𐀕𐀜, te-me-no (τέμενος, "témenos"), a word that survived in classical Greece (the temenos placed by Hephaestus on the shield of Achilles is called "royal"). In classical times the word has a religious connotation. Other important landowners were the 𐀨𐀷𐀐𐀲, ra-wa-ke-ta ("lāwāgetas"), literally translated as "the leader of the people", and sometimes interpreted as a given kingdom's military leader, though this is not confirmed by the inscriptions. Alternatively, he may have been the crown prince or, if one follows the argument of a single Mycenaean state, a local king who was a vassal to the overarching wanax / Great King. Below these two elevated persons, Linear B texts situate the 𐀳𐀩𐀲, te-re-ta ("telestai"), the officials. Leonard Robert Palmer suggests that the "telestai were the men of telos- the fief holders". The 𐀁𐀤𐀲, e-qe-ta (ekwetai, "companions" or "followers") were a group of nobles (aristocrats), who followed the king in peace and war. It seems that they were representatives of the king among military groups and religious personnel. There is also at least one instance of a person, Enkhelyawon at Pylos, who appears titleless in the written record but whom modern scholars regard as being probably a king.

From the existing evidence, it seems that the kingdom was further subdivided into sixteen districts. The 𐀒𐀩𐀮, ko-re-se was the "governor of the district" and the 𐀡𐀫𐀒𐀩𐀮, po-ro-ko-re-se was the "deputy". It is possible that these represent koreter and prokoreter. The 𐀅𐀗𐀒𐀫, da-mo-ko-ro (damokoros) was an official appointment but his duties are not very clear. The communal land was held at the hands of 𐀅𐀗, da-mo (literally, "people", cf. Attic δῆμος, dễmos), or "plot holders". It seems that the da-mo was a collective body of men, representing the local district and that it had certain power in public affairs. It is suggested that qa-si-re-u had a council of elders, a 𐀐𐀫𐀯𐀊, ke-ro-si-ja, (later γερουσία gerousia), but Palmer believes that it was an organization of "bronze smiths". The land was held by the wanax, by the damos, and by individual land owners. It seems that people lived in small family groups or clans around the main citadel. Occupying a lower rung of the social ladder were the slaves, do-e-ro, (cf. δοῦλος, doúlos). These are recorded in the texts as working either for the palace or for specific deities.

According to the traditional view, Mycenae or any other palatial center of mainland Greece was not an empire, and the mainland consisted of independent city-states. This view has in recent years, however, been challenged by various specialists, such as Jorrit Kelder and, most recently, Birgitta Eder and Reinhard Jung. Kelder pointed out that a number of palaces and fortifications appear to be part of a wider kingdom. For instance, Gla, located in the region of Boeotia, belonged to the state of nearby Orchomenos. The palace of Mycenae probably ruled over a territory two to three times the size of the other palatial states in Bronze Age Greece. Its territory would have also included adjacent centers, including Tiryns and Nauplion, which could plausibly be ruled by a member of Mycenae's ruling dynasty. Certain archaeological features in the palatial centers like the architectural uniformity, the uniformity of the administrative system, the uniformity in pottery, the imperial language and some large scale projects (drainage systems, harbours, roads etc.) indicate that large parts of Greece may have fallen under the sway of a single king, with various degrees of control over local vassals: a situation not dissimilar from the contemporary Hittite world, although the archaeological evidence remains ambiguous. A loose confederacy of city-states under the king of Mycenae, Agamemnon, is mentioned by Homer in Iliad.

== Religion ==
Much of the Mycenaean religion survived into classical Greece in their pantheon of Greek deities, but it is not known to what extent Greek religious belief is Mycenaean, nor how much is a product of the Greek Dark Ages or later. Moses I. Finley detected only few authentic Mycenaean beliefs in the 8th-century Homeric world, but Nilsson suggested that the Mycenaean religion was the mother of the Greek religion.

From the history traced by Nilsson and Guthrie, the Mycenaean pantheon consisted of Minoan deities, but also of gods and goddesses who appear under different names with similar functions in East and West. Many of these names appearing in the Linear B inscriptions can be found later in classical Greece, like Zeus, Hera, Poseidon, Athena, Hermes, Eileithyia and Dionysos, but the etymology is the only evidence of the cults.

There are several reasonable guesses that can be made, however. It seems that originally the Mycenaeans, like many Indo-Europeans, considered divine any object that inherited an internal power (anima). Certain religious beliefs were mixed with the beliefs of the local populations as it appears in the old cults of isolated Arcadia, which survived up to classical Greece. In these cults, Poseidon appears usually as a horse, representing the river spirit of the underworld, as usually happens in northern European folklore. The precursor goddesses of Demeter and Persephone are closely related with springs and animals, and especially with Poseidon and Artemis, who was the first nymph. Mycenaean religion was almost certainly polytheistic, and the Mycenaeans were actively syncretistic, adding foreign deities to their pantheon of deities with ease. The Mycenaeans probably entered Greece with a pantheon of deities headed by some ruling sky-deity, which linguists speculate might have been called *Dyeus in early Indo-European. In Greek, this deity would become Zeus (pronounced Zeus or Dias in ancient Greek). Among the Hindus, this sky-deity becomes "Dyaus Pita". In Latin he becomes "Deus Pater" or Jupiter; we still encounter this word in the etymologies of the words "deity" and "divine".

Later in some cults, Zeus is united with the Aegean Great Goddess, who is represented by Hera, in a "holy wedding" (hieros gamos). At some point in their cultural history, the Mycenaeans adopted some Minoan goddesses like Aphaea, Britomartis, Diktynna and associated them with their sky-god. Many of them were absorbed by more powerful divinities, and some like the vegetation goddesses Ariadne and Helen survived in Greek folklore together with the cult of the "divine child", who was probably the precursor of Dionysos. Athena and Hera survived and were tutelary goddesses, the guardians of the palaces and the cities. In general, later Greek religion distinguishes between two types of deities: the Olympian, or sky, deities (including Zeus), who are now commonly known in some form or another; and the chthonic deities, or deities of the earth. Walter Burkert warns: "To what extent one can and must differentiate between Minoan and Mycenaean religion is a question which has not yet found a conclusive answer." He suggests that useful parallels will be found in the relations between Hellenistic and Archaic Greek culture and religion, or between Roman and Etruscan culture.

The pantheon also included deities representing the powers of nature and wildlife, who appear with similar functions in the Mediterranean region. The "Mistress of the Animals" (Potnia Theron), later called Artemis, may be identified as the Minoan goddess Britomartis/Dictynna. Poseidon is the lord of the sea, and therefore of storms and earthquakes, (the "Earth shaker" in Linear B tablets). He may have functioned as a pre-Hellenic chthonic Zeus, the lord or spouse of the Earth goddess. Athena whose task was to protect the olive-trees is a civic Artemis. The powers of animal nature fostered a belief in nymphs whose existence was bound to the trees and the waters, and in gods with human forms and the heads or tails of animals who stood for primitive bodily instincts. In Arcadia were depicted animal-headed gods, indicating that in the remote past the gods were conceived as animals and birds, in a surrounding of animal-headed daemons. Later the gods were revealed in human forms with an animal as a companion or symbol. Some of the old gods survived in the cult of Dionysos (Satyrs) and Pan (the goat-god).

The Mycenaeans adopted probably from the east a priest-king system and the belief of a ruling deity in the hands of a theocratic society. At the end of the second millennium BC, when the Mycenaean palaces collapsed, it seems that Greek thought was gradually released from the idea that each man was a servant to the gods, and sought a "moral purpose". It is possible that this procedure started before the end of the Mycenaean age, but the idea is almost absent or vague in the Homeric poems, where the interference of the gods is not related to the rightness or wrongness of men's actions. Later, Hesiod uses a lot of eastern material in his cosmology and in the genealogical trees of the gods, and he introduces the idea of the existence of something else behind the gods, which was more powerful than they.

The Olympian Pantheon is an ordered system. The Greek divinities live with Zeus at the helm and each is concerned with a recognizable sphere. However, certain elements in some Greek cults indicate the survival of some older cults from a less rationalized world: old cults of the dead, agrarian magic, exorcism of evil spirits, peculiar sacrifices, and animal-headed gods. In the Homeric poems, the avenging Fate was probably originally a daemon acting in parallel with the gods. Later, the cult of Dionysos Zagreus indicates that life-blood of animals was needed to renew that of men. A similar belief may be guessed from the Mycenaean Hagia Triada sarcophagus (1400 BC), which combines features of Minoan civilization and Mycenaean style. It seems that the blood of a bull was used for the regeneration of the reappearing dead. Probably most of these cults existed in the Mycenaean period and survived by immemorial practice.

A secondary level of importance was the cult of the heroes, which seems to have started in the Mycenaean era. These were great men of the past who were exalted to honor after death, because of what they had done. According to an old Minoan belief, beyond the sea there was an island called Elysion, where the departed could have a different but happier existence. Later, the Greeks believed that there could live in human form only heroes and the beloved of the gods. The souls of the rest would drift unconsciously in the gloomy space of Hades. Gods and men had common origins, but there was an enormous gap between the immortal gods and mortal men. However, certain elements indicate that the Mycenaeans probably believed in a future existence. Two well-preserved bodies were found in Shaft Grave VI, and Wolfgang Helbig believed that an embalming preceded the burial. In the shaft graves discovered by Heinrich Schliemann, the corpses were lightly exposed to fire in order to preserve them.

Mycenaean religion certainly involved offerings and sacrifices to the deities, and some have speculated that their ceremonies involved human sacrifice based on textual evidence and bones found outside tombs. In the Homeric poems, there seems to be a lingering cultural memory of human sacrifice in King Agamemnon's sacrifice of his daughter, Iphigenia; several of the stories of Trojan heroes involve tragic human sacrifice. In the far past, even human beings might be offered to placate inscrutable gods, especially in times of guilty fear. Later sacrifice became a feast at which oxen were slaughtered. Men kept the meat, and gave the gods the bones wrapped in fat.

Beyond this speculation we can go no further. Somewhere in the shades of the centuries between the fall of the Mycenaean civilization and the end of the Greek Dark Ages, the original Mycenaean religion persisted and adapted until it finally emerged in the stories of human devotion, apostasy, and divine capriciousness that exists in the two great epic poems of Homer.

== Mycenae in Greek mythology and legends ==
=== Kings of Mycenae ===
King	Notable information
Perseus	Grandson of King Acrisius of Argos; Legendary founder of Mycenae and the Perseid dynasty; considered one of the greatest heroes and slayer of monsters before the times of Heracles.
Electryon	Son of Perseus and Andromeda; his succession was disputed by the Taphians under Pterelaos, who assaulted Mycenae, lost, and stole the cattle; the cattle were recovered by Amphitryon, but he accidentally killed Electryon with a club in an unruly cattle incident.
Sthenelus	Younger brother of Electryon; exiles Amphitryon after taking power; expands prestige of his kingdom by marrying Nicippe, a daughter of King Pelops of Elis, the most powerful state of the region; he was killed by Hyllus, the son of Heracles.
Eurystheus	Son of Sthenelus; resentful towards Heracles for his father's death, he persecutes the Heracleidae; final king of the Perseid dynasty when he and his sons are all killed during his war against Athens for housing the Heracleidae.
Atreus	Maternal uncle of Eurystheus and founder of the Atreid dynasty; competed against his brother Thyestes for the throne and persecuted him after winning; was killed by Thyestes's son Aegisthus to restore his father to the throne.
Thyestes	Brother of Atreus; ruled jointly with his son Aegisthus; exiled the sons of Atreus, Agamemnon and Menelaus to Sparta; both Thyestes and Aegisthus are removed from power and exiled after Menelaus becomes king of Sparta and invades to place his brother Agamemnon to the throne.
Agamemnon	Son of Atreus and Aerope; commanded the Greeks during the Trojan War; his wife Clytemnestra becomes lovers with Aegisthus and with him plots to kill Agamemnon upon his return.
Aegisthus	Son of Thyestes; returns to the throne after killing Agamemnon and rules Mycenae for 7 years; he and his lover Clytemnestra are killed by the son of Agamemnon, Orestes who is forced to flee and is pursued by the Erinyes.
Aletes	Son of Aegisthus and Clytemnestra; assumes the throne at a young age after his parents are killed by his half-brother Orestes who flees; Orestes returns several years later with troops and kills Aletes and takes the throne.
Orestes	Son of Agamemnon and Clytemnestra; takes the throne after returning to Mycenae and killing his half-brother Aletes; he spends his reign building a larger state in the Peloponnese; he dies in Arcadia from a snake bite.
Tisamenus	Son of Orestes; final king of the Atreid dynasty; he was killed in the final battle with the Heracleidae who sought to retake the Peloponnese as their ancestral lands; they divided his territories amongst themselves and brought the end of the Mycenaean Kingdom.

=== Perseid dynasty ===
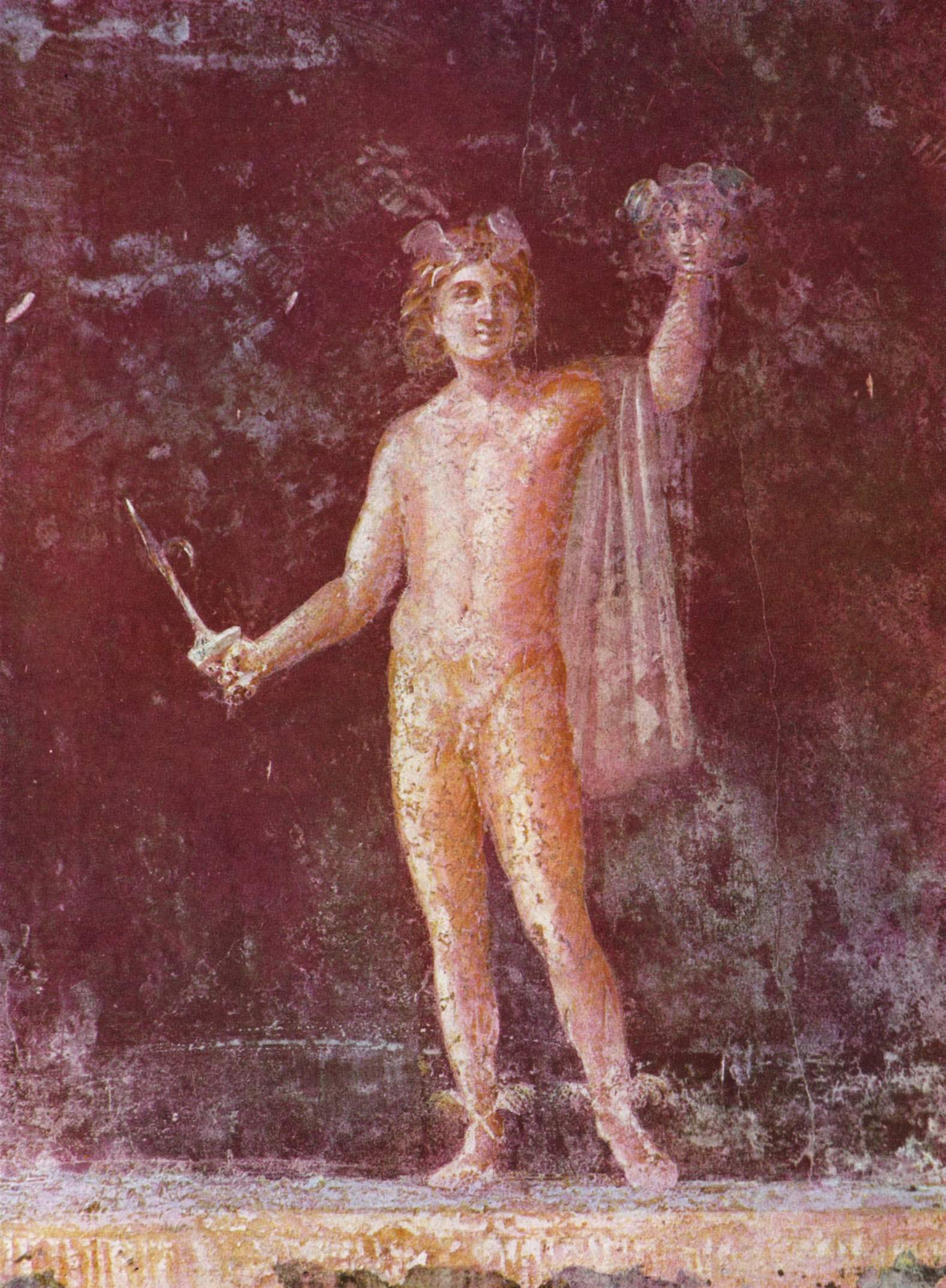
Perseus, from Pompeii

Classical Greek myths assert that Mycenae was founded by Perseus, grandson of king Acrisius of Argos, son of Acrisius's daughter, Danaë and the god Zeus. Having killed his grandfather by accident, Perseus could not, or would not, inherit the throne of Argos. Instead he arranged an exchange of realms with his cousin, Megapenthes, and became king of Tiryns, Megapenthes taking Argos. After that, he founded Mycenae and ruled the kingdoms jointly from there.

Perseus married Andromeda and had many sons. His son, Electryon, became the second of the dynasty, but the succession was disputed by the Taphians under Pterelaos, another Perseid, who assaulted Mycenae, lost, and retreated with the cattle. The cattle were recovered by Amphitryon, a grandson of Perseus, but he killed his uncle by accident with a club in an unruly cattle incident and had to go into exile.

The throne went to Sthenelus, third in the dynasty, a son of Perseus. He set the stage for future greatness by marrying Nicippe, a daughter of King Pelops of Elis, the most powerful state of the region and the times. With her he had a son, Eurystheus, the fourth and last of the Perseid dynasty. When a son of Heracles, Hyllus, killed Sthenelus, Eurystheus became noted for his enmity to Heracles and for his ruthless persecution of the Heracleidae, the descendants of Heracles.

This is the first we hear in legend of those noted sons, who became a symbol of the Dorians. Heracles had been a Perseid. After his death, Eurystheus determined to annihilate these rivals for the throne of Mycenae, but they took refuge in Athens, and in the course of war, Eurystheus and all his sons were killed. The Perseid dynasty came to an end and the people of Mycenae placed Eurystheus's maternal uncle, Atreus, a Pelopid, on the throne.

=== Atreid dynasty ===
The people of Mycenae had received advice from an oracle that they should choose a new king from among the Pelopids. The two contenders were Atreus and his brother, Thyestes. The latter was chosen at first. At this moment nature intervened and the sun appeared to reverse direction by setting in the east. Atreus argued that because the sun had reversed its path, the election of Thyestes should be reversed. The argument was heeded, and Atreus became king. His first move was to pursue Thyestes and all his family – that is, his own kin – but Thyestes managed to escape from Mycenae.

In legend, Atreus had two sons, Agamemnon and Menelaus, the Atreids. Aegisthus, the son of Thyestes, killed Atreus and restored Thyestes to the throne. With the help of King Tyndareus of Sparta, the Atreids drove Thyestes again into exile. Tyndareus had two ill-starred daughters, Helen and Clytemnestra, whom Menelaus and Agamemnon married, respectively. Agamemnon inherited Mycenae and Menelaus became king of Sparta.

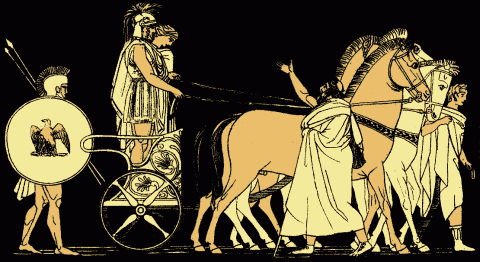
The Return of Agamemnon, illustration from Stories from the Greek Tragedians by Alfred Church, 1897

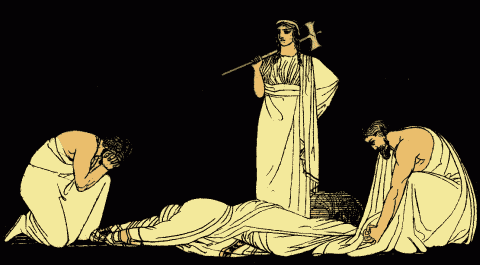
The Murder of Agamemnon, illustration from Stories from the Greek Tragedians by Alfred Church, 1897

==== Homeric poems ====
Soon, Helen eloped with Paris of Troy. Agamemnon conducted a 10-year war against Troy to get her back for his brother. Because of lack of wind, the warships could not sail to Troy. In order to please the gods so that they might make the winds start to blow, Agamemnon sacrificed his daughter Iphigenia. According to some versions of the legend, the hunting goddess Artemis replaced her at the very last moment with a deer on the altar, and took Iphigenia to Tauris (see Iphigenia in Tauris by Euripides). The deities, having been satisfied by such a sacrifice, made the winds blow and the Greek fleet departed.

Legend tells us that the long and arduous Trojan War, although nominally a Greek victory, brought anarchy, piracy, and ruin; already before the Greek fleet set sail for Troy, the conflict had divided the gods as well, and this contributed to curses and acts of vengeance following many of the Greek heroes. After the war Agamemnon returned to Mycenae and was greeted royally with a red carpet rolled out for him. Shortly thereafter, he was slain by Clytemnestra, who hated him bitterly for having ordered the sacrifice of their daughter Iphigenia in order to gain favorable winds to Troy. Clytemnestra was aided in her crime by Aegistheus, her lover, who reigned subsequently, but Orestes, her son by Agamemnon, was smuggled out to Phocis. He returned as an adult with his sister Electra to slay Clytemnestra and Aegistheus. He then fled to Athens to evade justice and a matricide, and became insane for a time. Meanwhile, the throne of Mycenae went to Aletes, son of Aegistheus, but not for long. Recovering, Orestes returned to Mycenae with Electra to kill Aletes and took the throne. This story is told in numerous plays, including the Oresteia, Sophocles' Electra, and Euripides' Electra.

==== End of the Atreids ====
Orestes then built a larger state in the Peloponnese, but he died in Arcadia from a snake bite. His son, Tisamenus, the last of the Atreid dynasty, was killed by the Heracleidae on their return to the Peloponnesus. They claimed the right of the Perseids to inherit the various kingdoms of the Peloponnese and cast lots for the dominion of them, thus leaving the Atreids as the final rulers of Legendary Mycenae.

== Modern history and excavation ==
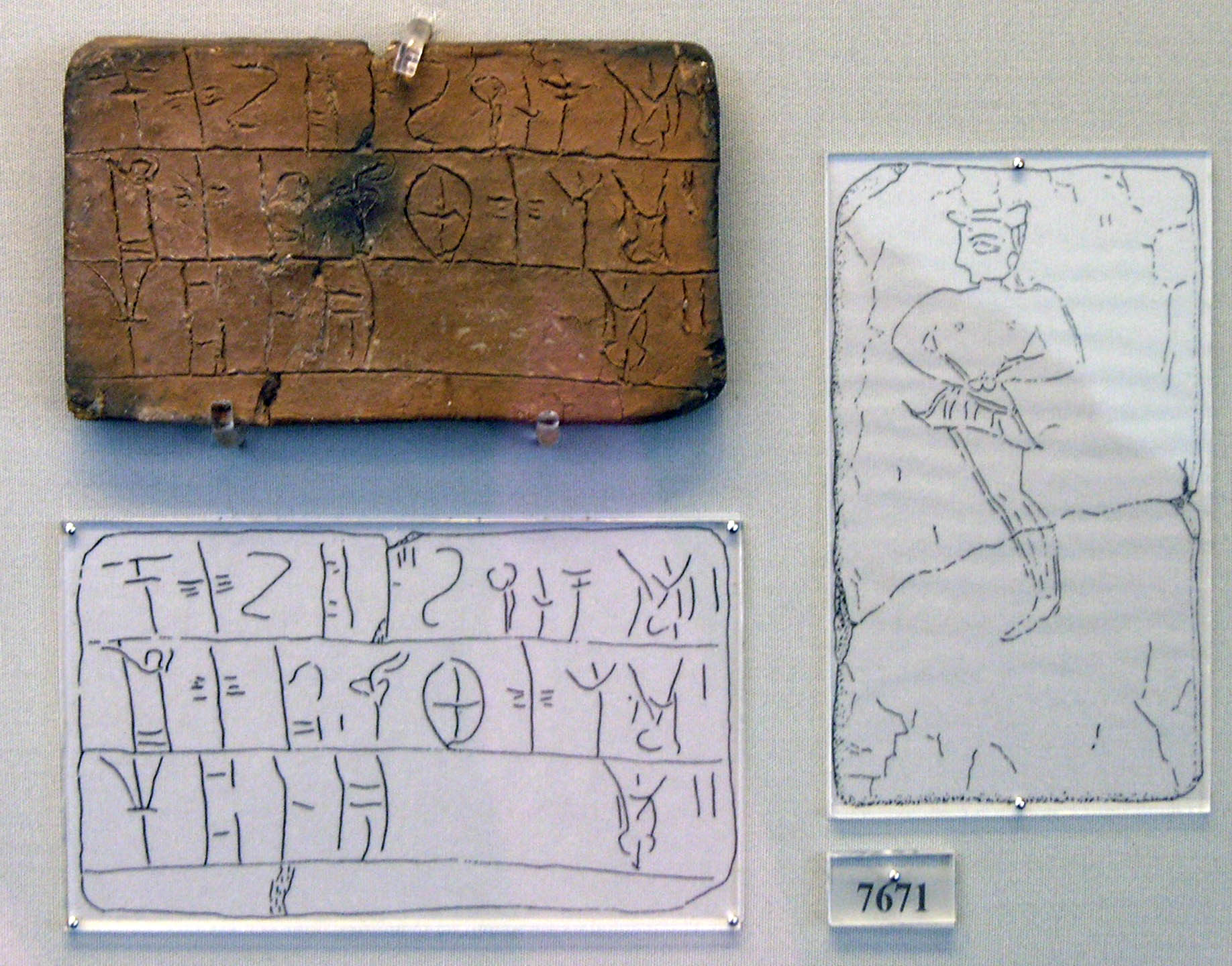
A clay tablet from Mycenae, with writing in Linear B

The site of Mycenae appears to have been abandoned after its short-lived Hellenistic resettlement. By the time of Pausanias' visit in the second century AD, he described the site as a 'ruin', though noted that parts of the walls and the Lion Gate could still be seen. Grave Circle A, meanwhile, was already buried in prehistoric times, and is unlikely to have been visible to Pausanias. The site may still have been visible in the 5th century AD, when it was correctly located on the Roman map known as the Tabula Peutingeriana, but the location seems to have been forgotten during the medieval period: it was generally misplaced on fifteenth-century maps, and Cyriac of Ancona, who believed he visited the site in 1447/1448, had actually seen the nearby fort of Katsingri. Similarly, modern scholarship has disproved the claims of two sixteenth-century travellers to have visited the site: André de Monceaux, who claimed to have visited the site in 1669, and the French military officer Nicola Mirabel, who believed that he had done so in 1691.

=== Early archaeological work (1700–1876) ===
In 1700, the Venetian engineer Francesco Vandeyk made the first known correct identification of Mycenae of modern times while surveying the Peloponnese (known to the Venetians as the 'Morea') under the orders of Francesco Grimani, Provveditore of the Venetian armies occupying the region. Vandeyk partially dismantled the debris that was then obscuring the Lion Gate, and identified the tomb now known as the 'Treasury of Atreus', even conjecturing that it was the tomb of a king of Mycenae. During the 18th century, Mycenae was visited only infrequently by tourists, such as the Frenchman Claude-Louis Fourmont, who visited Mycenae in 1729–1730 and drew parts of the walls and gates. From 1796, however, Napoleon's invasion of Italy encouraged members of the Society of Dilettanti, whose 'Grand Tour' normally took place in Italy, to find alternative destinations, and members of the society began to include Mycenae on their itineraries: seeing it, in the words of Cathy Gere, as 'the ultimate Romantic ruin.'

In the early 19th century, local tradition held that the Treasury of Atreus had been once explored by the agha of the nearby village of Karvati, who took from it a bronze lamp. By this period, more of Mycenae's monuments were visible and known to European visitors. In 1802, the British aristocrat Thomas Bruce, 7th Earl of Elgin visited Mycenae looking for antiquities that might be taken back to Britain. While he had originally sought to remove the sculpted relief of the Lion Gate, it proved too large to lift or transport, and so Elgin asked the voivode of Nafplio to clear the Treasury of Atreus, from which he removed fragments of pottery vases, ornamental stonework and a marble vase, as well as parts of its sculptural decoration. In June 1810, (Note: Christos Tsountas, in 1897, wrote that Veli Pasha had 'rifled' the tomb in 1808: it is not known whether he is referring to the same incident.) Veli Pasha, the Ottoman Pasha of the Morea, excavated the tomb, clearing most of the entrance, and entered the chamber with ladders; according to Heinrich Schliemann's later publication of his own excavations at Mycenae, he discovered 'bones covered with gold', as well as gemstones and other gold and silver objects. Veli Pasha removed four large fragments of the semi-engaged columns beside the doorway, some of which he gave as a gift to Howe Browne, 2nd Marquess of Sligo, who visited him shortly after the excavations. (Note: It is sometimes claimed that Sligo directed or co-directed the removals himself; this is likely to be erroneous, as Sligo arrived in Argolis only after the excavation and his letters make no mention of it.)

In 1834, the site was surveyed and mapped by French troops. In 1841, Kyriakos Pittakis, working on behalf of the Archaeological Society of Athens, cleared the approach to the Lion Gate and made a tentative exploration of the Tomb of Clytemnestra.

=== Schliemann's excavations (1874–1876) ===
The archaeologist Heinrich Schliemann was particularly invested in the site of Mycenae. Schliemann was obsessed with the epic poetry of Homer and believed Homer's stories were based in historical truth. In the later part of his life, he dedicated himself to excavating historical sites relevant to the Homeric epics. Schliemann's first excavation was the site of Hisarlik, believed to be the site of ancient Troy. Following his work at Hisarlik, Schliemann began excavations at Mycenae in 1876. His goal was to find the grave of Agamemnon, the king of Mycenae and leader of the Greek army in the Trojan War as described in Homer's Iliad. Schliemann uncovered a royal cemetery containing six shaft graves, known as Grave Circle A. Among his findings at Grave Circle A was a gold death mask that he labeled as "The Mask of Agamemnon". Modern archeological evidence has proven his claims of discovering Agamemnon's remains were most likely false, as the mask is dated more than 300 years before the events of the Trojan War.

Schliemann's discoveries at Mycenae have come under controversy. Schliemann's archaeological work in general is controversial, with some calling Schliemann "the father of scientific archaeology" and others criticizing Schliemann's destructive methods of excavation. The authenticity of Schliemann's excavation of Grave Circle A has come under question, with some critics claiming that Schliemann smuggled additional artifacts into Mycenae and then falsely claimed to have discovered them. Modern evidence suggests that Schliemann's findings at Grave Circle A were genuine, but significantly predate the Trojan War.

Sketch of the Citadel of Mycenae after Schliemann's excavations from a London newspaper

=== Excavations since Schliemann (1876–present) ===
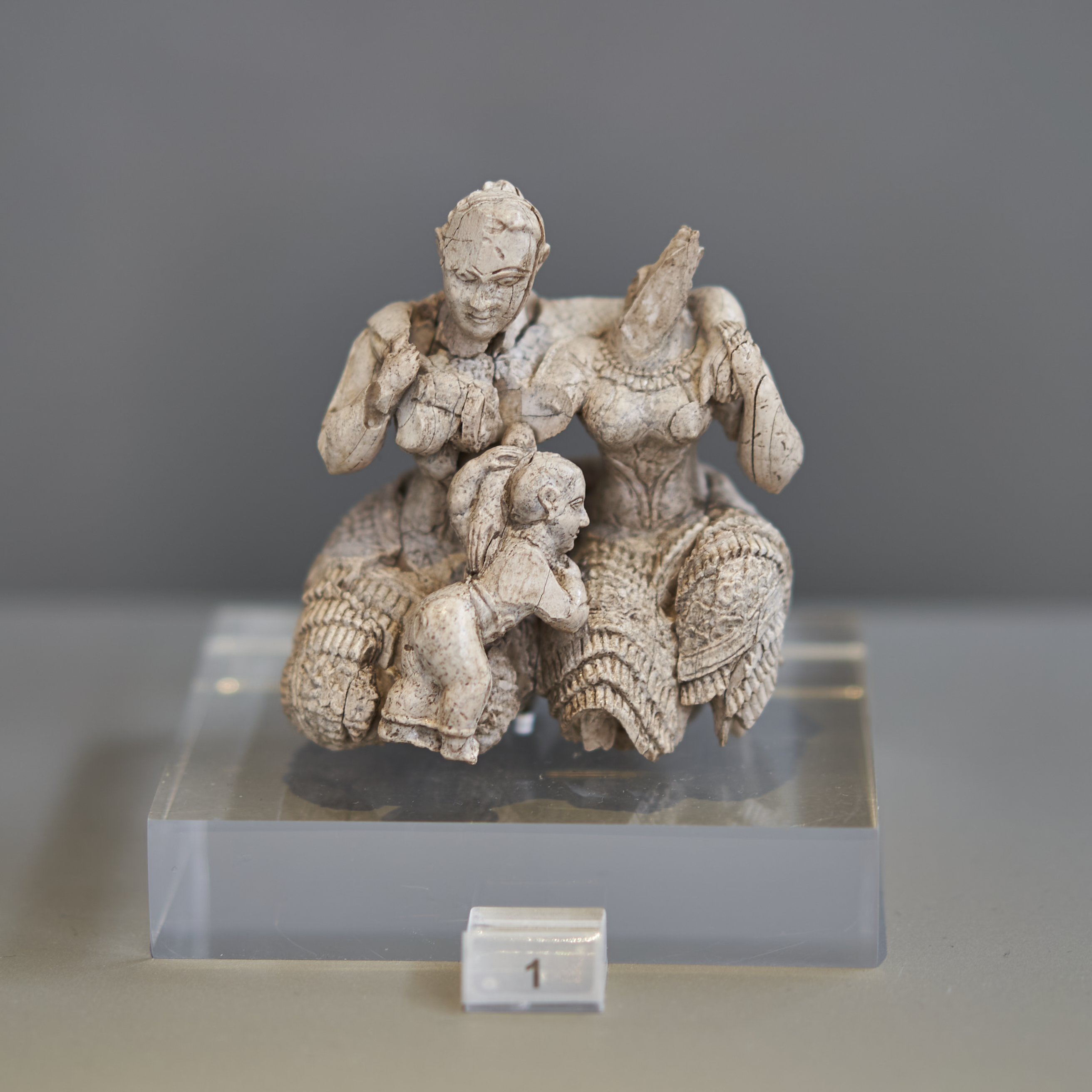
Figurine, known as the "Ivory Triad", found by Alan Wace on the citadel of Mycenae in 1939

Since Schliemann's day, more scientific excavations have taken place at Mycenae, mainly by Greek archaeologists but also by the British School at Athens. Christos Tsountas, another member of the ASA, cleared a significant portion of the citadel during his excavations of the site beginning in 1884 and ending in 1902. The Athens Archaeological Society is currently excavating the Mycenae Lower Town (as of 2011), with support from Dickinson College and the Institute for Aegean Prehistory. Afterwards, Tsountas and the ASA gave permission to the British School of Archaeology (BSA) to excavate; the BSA conducted excavations from 1920 to 1955 under the supervision of Alan John Bayard Wace, assisted by Winifred Lamb. In 1951, workers discovered Grave Circle B. After Wace died in 1957, excavation work was finished by Lord William Taylour from 1958 to 1969, especially on the west slope of the citadel. The ASA continued excavation work on the site with efforts led by John Papadimitriou and Nicolas Verdelis in the late 1950s and early 1960s, as well as by George Mylonas from 1957 up until 1985. In 1985, excavation work was directed by Spyros Iakovidis who, as of 2009, is still overseeing the ASA's research mission in both fieldwork and publication preparation.

=== World Heritage site ===
In 1999 the archeological site of Mycenae was added to the UNESCO World Heritage List, along with the nearby site of Tiryns.

A stringent legal framework was established to safeguard the integrity of the Mycenae and Tiryns sites against vandalism and other forms of damage and disturbance to the remains. The Hellenic Ministry of Culture and Sports monitors the two archaeological sites. To maintain the quality and conditions of the Mycenaean and Tiryn sites, archaeological study is conducted methodically and systematically.

The Greek Antiquities Law No 3028/2002, on the 'Conservation of Antiquities and Cultural Heritage in General', governs the preservation and protection of the sites. Ministerial Decree No 2160 of 1964 created and safeguarded the limits of Mycenae in addition to the sites themselves. The acropolis and the wider surroundings are also covered by the extension of protection conferred by this ministerial decree. Ministerial Decrees No 102098/4753 of 1956 and 12613/696 of 1991 both provide protection for the Tiryns archaeological site.

== See also ==
- List of ancient Greek cities
- Boar's tusk helmet
- Fortification of Mycenae
- Gold Grave Goods at Grave Circles A and B
- National Archaeological Museum of Athens

== Bibliography ==
- Andronikos, Manolis (1954). Η 'Δωρική Εισβολή' και τα Αρχαιολογικά Ευρήματα. Hellenika (in Greek). 13: 221–240.
- Beaudouin, Mondry (1880). "Fragments d'une description de l'Argolide faite en 1700 par un ingénieur italien". Bulletin de Correspondance Hellénique. 4: 206–210. doi:10.3406/bch.1880.4318.
- Beckman, Gary M.; Bryce, Trevor R.; Cline, Eric H. (2012). "Writings from the Ancient World: The Ahhiyawa Texts" (PDF). Writings from the Ancient World. Atlanta: Society of Biblical Literature. ISSN 1570-7008. Archived (PDF) from the original on 2022-10-09.
- Beekes, Robert Stephen Paul (2009). Etymological Dictionary of Greek. Leiden and Boston: Brill. ISBN 978-9-00-417418-4.
- Blakolmer, Fritz (2010). "Images and Perceptions of the Lion Gate Relief at Mycenae during the 19th Century". In F. Buscemi (ed.). The Representation of Ancient Architecture in the XIXth Century. Cogitata. pp. 49–66.
- Burkert, Walter (1987) [1985]. Greek Religion: Archaic and Classical. Oxford and Malden: Blackwell Publishing Limited. ISBN 978-1-11-872499-6.
- Bury, J. B.; Meiggs, Russell (1975). A History of Greece (4th ed.). London: MacMillan Press. ISBN 978-0-333-15492-2.
- Castleden, Rodney (2005). The Mycenaeans. London and New York: Routledge. ISBN 978-0-415-36336-5.
- Chadwick, John (1976). The Mycenaean World. Cambridge, UK: Cambridge University Press. ISBN 978-0-521-29037-1.
- Chapman, Robert (2005). "Changing Social Relations in the Mediterranean Copper and Bronze Ages". In Blake, Emma; Knapp, A. Bernard (eds.). The Archaeology of Mediterranean Prehistory. Oxford and Malden: Blackwell Publishing. pp. 77–101. ISBN 978-1-40-513724-9.
- Chew, Sing C. (2000). "Neglecting Nature: World Accumulation and Core-Periphery Relations, 2500 BC to AD 1990". In Denemark, Robert A. (ed.). World-System History: The Social Science of Long-Term Change. London and New York: Routledge. pp. 216–234.
- Desborough, V. (1975). "The End of Myceanean Civilization and the Dark Ages: The Archaeological Background". In Edwards, I.E.S.; Gadd, C.J.; Hammond, N.G.L.; et al. (eds.). The Cambridge Ancient History II (2). Cambridge: Cambridge University Press. pp. 658–677. ISBN 9780521086912.
- Dietrich, Bernard Clive (1973). The Origins of Greek Religion. Berlin: Walter de Gruyter. ISBN 978-3-11-003982-5.
- Drake, Brandon L. (2012). "The influence of climatic change on the Late Bronze Age collapse and the Greek dark ages". Journal of Archaeological Science. 39 (6): 1862–1870. Bibcode:2012JArSc..39.1862D. doi:10.1016/j.jas.2012.01.029.
- Finley, Moses I. (1954). The World of Odysseus. New York, NY: New York Review Books. ISBN 978-1-59-017017-5.
- Forsén, Jeannette (1992). The Twilight of the Early Helladics. Partille, Sweden: Paul Aströms Förlag. ISBN 978-91-7081-031-2.
- French, Elizabeth Bayard (2002). Mycenae: Agamemnon's Capital. Stroud: Tempus. ISBN 978-0-7524-1951-0.
- Gagarin, Michael, ed. (2010). The Oxford Encyclopedia of Ancient Greece and Rome. Vol. 1. New York and Oxford: Oxford University Press. ISBN 978-0-19-517072-6.
- Gere, Cathy (2006). The Tomb of Agamemnon: Mycenae and the Search for a Hero. London: Profile Books. ISBN 9781861976178.
- Helbig, Wolfgang (1884). Das Homerische Epos aus den Denkmälern Erläutert (in German). Leipzig: B.G. Teubner.
- Hornblower, Simon; Spawforth, Antony; Eidinow, Esther (2012). The Oxford Classical Dictionary (4th ed.). Oxford: Oxford University Press. ISBN 978-0-19-954556-8.
- Iakovidis, Spyridon (2005). "Mycenae: Past Achievements, Present Tasks and Future Prospects". Bulletin of the Institute of Classical Studies. 48: 163–171. doi:10.1111/j.2041-5370.2005.tb00259.x. JSTOR 43646724.
- Jeffrey, L.H. (1976). Archaic Greece: The City-States c. 700–500 BC. London: Ernest Benn. ISBN 978-0-510-03271-5.
- Kaniewski, David; Paulissen, Etienne; van Campo, Élise; Weiss, Harvey; Otto, Thierry; Bretschneider, Joachim; van Lerberghe, Karel (2010). "Late second–early first millennium BC abrupt climate changes in coastal Syria and their possible significance for the history of the Eastern Mediterranean". Quaternary Research. 74 (2): 207–215. Bibcode:2010QuRes..74..207K. doi:10.1016/j.yqres.2010.07.010. S2CID 29084902.
- Kelder, Jorrit M. (2010). "The Kingdom of Mycenae: A Great Kingdom in the Late Bronze Age Aegean". CDL Press. Bethesda, MD.
- Kerényi, Karl (1976). Dionysus: Archetypal Image of Indestructible Life. Princeton, NJ: Princeton University Press. ISBN 978-0-69-102915-3.
- Komita, Nobuo (1982). "The Grave Circles at Mycenae and the Early Indo-Europeans". Research Reports of Ikutoku Technical University (A-7): 59–70. Archived from the original on 26 January 2022.
- Loughlin, Thomas (2021). "The Marquess and Mycenae". Archaeology Ireland. 35 (1): 44–48. JSTOR 27075191.
- Luce, John Victor (1975). Homer and the Heroic Age. New York: Harper & Row. ISBN 978-0-06-012722-0.
- Moore, Dudley; Rowlands, Edward; Karadimas, Nektarios (2014). In Search of Agamemnon: Early Travellers to Mycenae. Newcastle upon Tyne: Cambridge Scholars Publishing. ISBN 978-1-4438-5776-5.
- Mylonas, George Emmanuel (1966). Mycenae and the Mycenaean Age. Princeton, NJ: Princeton University Press. ISBN 9780691035239.
- Nilsson, Martin Persson (1967). Geschichte der Griechischen Religion (in German) (3rd ed.). Munich: C.H. Beck Verlag.
- Nur, Amos (2008). Apocalypse: Earthquakes, Archaeology and the Wrath of God. Princeton, NJ: Princeton University Press. ISBN 978-0-69-101602-3.
- Page, Denys Lionel (1976) [1959]. History and the Homeric Iliad. Berkeley and Los Angeles: University of California Press. ISBN 978-0-52-003246-0.
- Popko, Maciej (2008). Völker und Sprachen Altanatoliens (in German). Wiesbaden: Otto Harrassowitz Verlag. ISBN 978-3-447-05708-0.
- Scarre, Christopher (1999). The Seventy Wonders of the Ancient World: The Great Monuments and How They Were Built. London: Thames and Hudson. ISBN 978-0-50-005096-5.
- Schachermeyer, Fritz (1964). Die Minoische Kultur des alten Kreta. Stuttgart: Kohlhammer Verlag.
- Schliemann, Heinrich (1878). Mykena (in German). Leipzig.
- Shelton, Kim S. (2010). "Living and Dying in and Around Middle Helladic Mycenae". In Philippa-Touchais, Anna; Touchais, Gilles; Voutsaki, Sofia; et al. (eds.). MESOHELLADIKA: The Greek Mainland in the Middle Bronze Age (Bulletin de Correspondance Hellénique: Supplément, Volume 52). Athens: École française d'Athènes. pp. 57–65. ISBN 978-2-86958-210-1.
- Smith, A.H. (1916). "Lord Elgin and His Collection". The Journal of Hellenic Studies. 36: 163–372. doi:10.2307/625773. JSTOR 625773. S2CID 163053341.
- Sweeney, Emmet John (2009). Gods, Heroes and Tyrants: Greek Chronology in Chaos. New York: Algora Publishing. ISBN 978-0-87586-683-3.
- Tsountas, Christos (1897). The Mycenaean Age: A Study of the Monuments and Culture of Pre-Homeric Greece. London.
- Velikovsky, Immanuel (1999). The Dark Age of Greece. Shulamit V. Kogan & Ruth V. Sharon.
- Vermeule, Emily Townsend (March 1960). "The Fall of the Mycenaean Empire". Archaeology. 13 (1): 66–76. JSTOR 41663738.
- Walcot, Peter (1966). Hesiod and the Near East. Wales: University of Wales Press. ISBN 9780708304952.
- West, Martin L. (2001). "Atreus and Attarissiyas". Glotta. 77 (3/4). Vandenhoeck & Ruprecht (GmbH & Co. KG): 262–266. JSTOR 40267129.
- Wunderlich, Hans Georg (1974). The Secret of Crete. New York: Macmillan Publishing Company, Incorporated. ISBN 978-0-02-631600-2.
- Wood, Jonathan; Hsu, Yi-Ting; Bell, Carol (30 June 2021). "Sending Laurion Back to the Future: Bronze Age Silver and the Source of Confusion". Internet Archaeology. doi:10.11141/ia.56.9. S2CID 236973111.
- Younger, John (2010). "Archaeological Atlas of Mycenae". Gnomon. 82: 623–653. doi:10.17104/0017-1417_2010_7_623. hdl:1808/6861.
