= Neritus (mythology) =

In Greek mythology, Neritus (Ancient Greek: Νήριτος, romanized: Nēritos) was a son of King Pterelaus of the Teleboans and a descendant of Zeus.

== Family ==
Neritus' mother was Amphimede, and thus brothers to Ithacus and Polyctor.

== Mythology ==
Originally from Cephallenia, Neritus together with his brothers decided to leave their homeland to preserve their own way of life. They were drawn to a nearby island, choosing it as the perfect site for a new colony because of its towering mountains offered excellent natural protection. After establishing their settlement, the local geography was named in their honour: the island itself became Ithaca, named after Ithacus; the prominent peak nearby was named Mount Neritus, after Neritus himself; and a third landmark Polyctorium, took its name from Polyctor. These brothers were also said to have made a basin of stone in Ithaca into which a spring ran.
