= Pterelaus =

Two individuals in Greek mythology

The name Pterelaus (/ˌtɛrəˈleɪəs/; Ancient Greek: Πτερέλαος, romanized: Pterelaos, lit. 'wings of the people') is attributed to two related individuals in Greek mythology:

- Pterelaus, son of King Lelex of Megara.
- Pterelaus, son of Taphius.
