= Fortifications of Mycenae =

Bronze Age structures in Greece

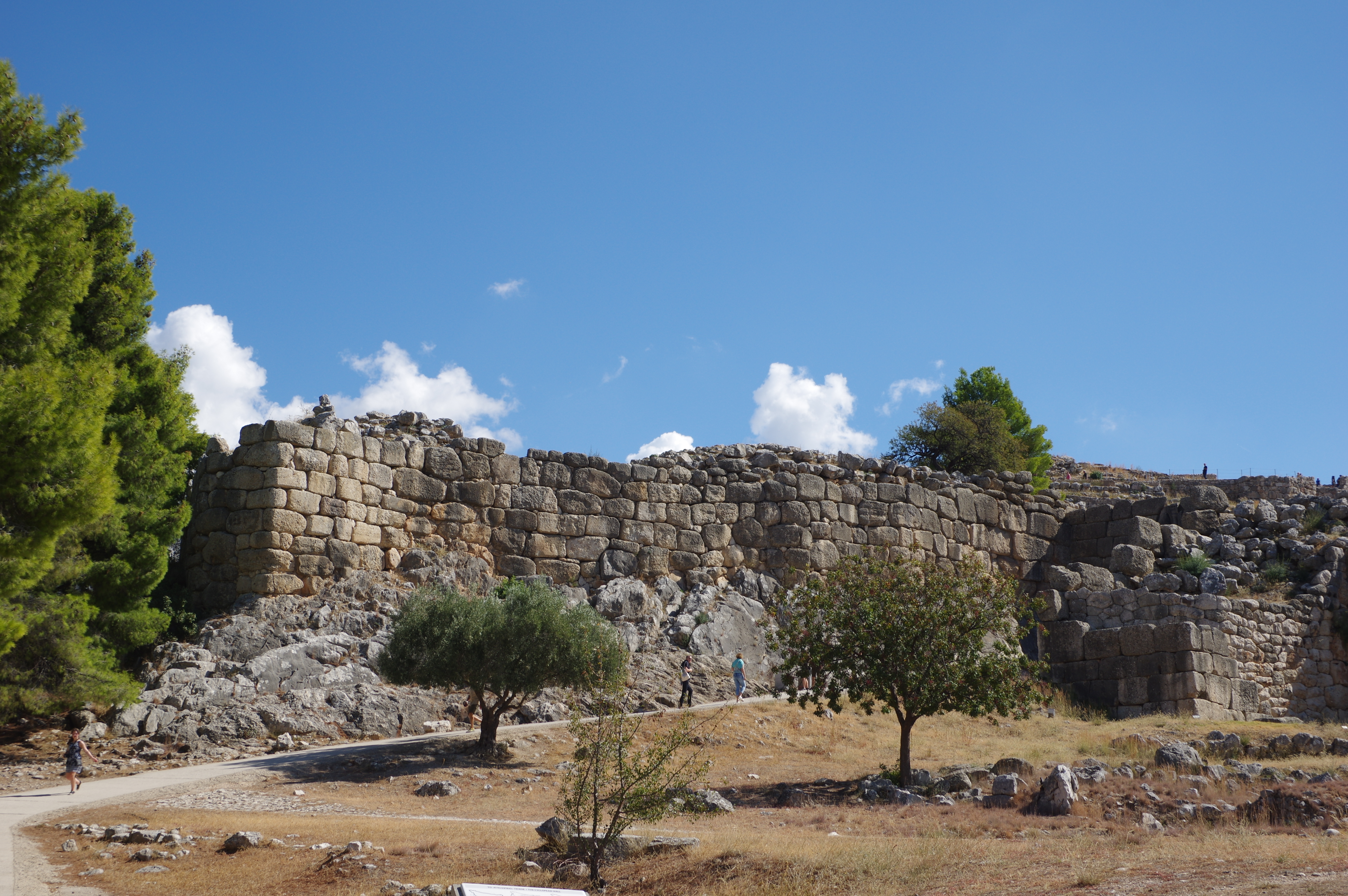
The fortifications of Mycenae

Mycenae is a city in the Argolid, in the Peloponnese peninsula of Greece. It was first excavated by Heinrich and Sophia Schliemann in the 1870s and is believed to have flourished in the Mid- to Late Bronze Age. The fortifications of Mycenae were built with the use of Cyclopean masonry. With the citadel built on a cliff, the architects created protection not only for the upper class that lived within the walls, but the lower-class farmers in the surrounding areas, who could find refuge there in times of war. Due to high competition in the Mid to Late Bronze Age, the citadel wall expanded significantly with the inclusion of Grave Circle A and the addition of the Lion Gate.

== Citadel Walls (expansion and inclusion of Grave Circle A) ==
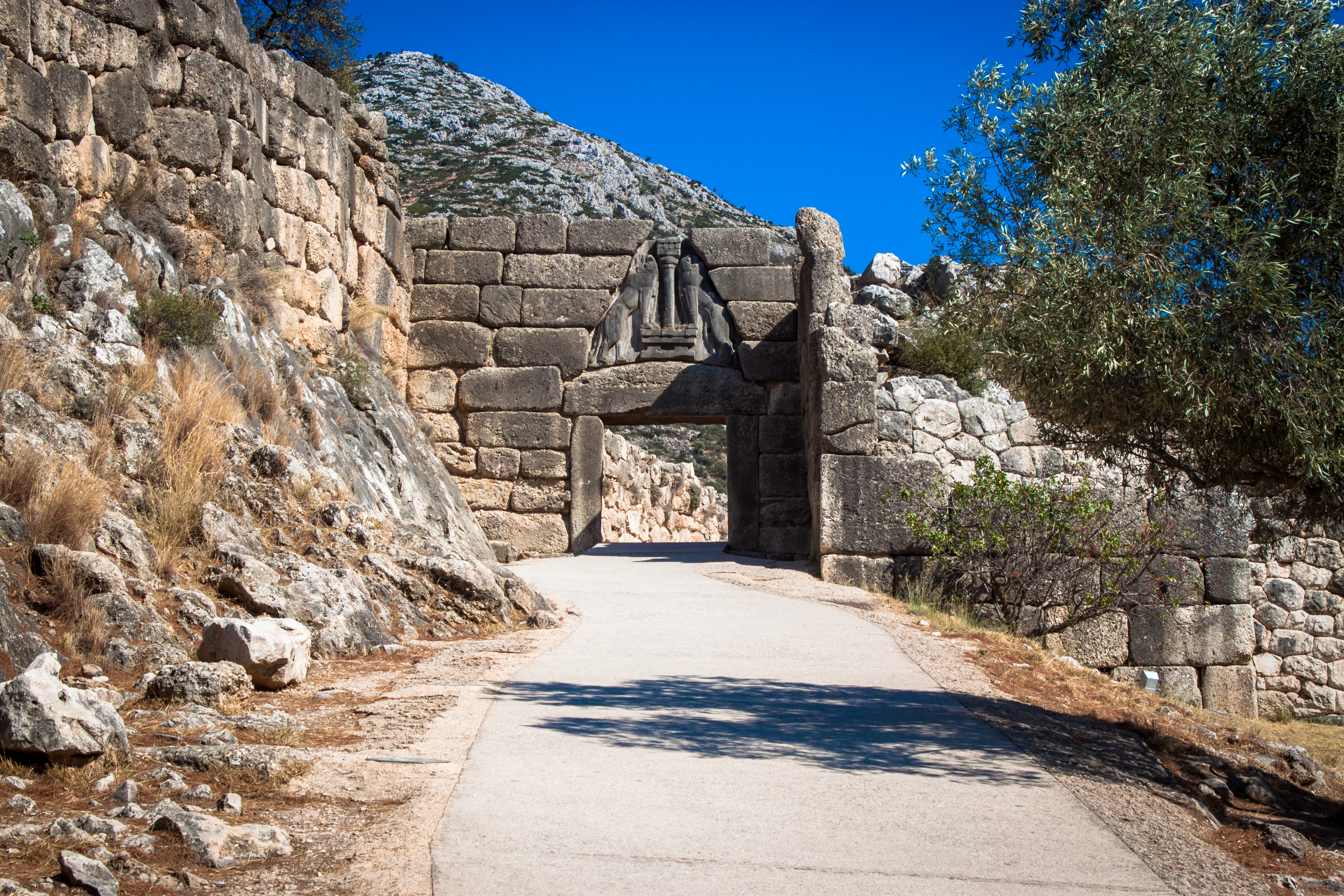
Lion Gate and example of Cyclopean masonry at Mycenae

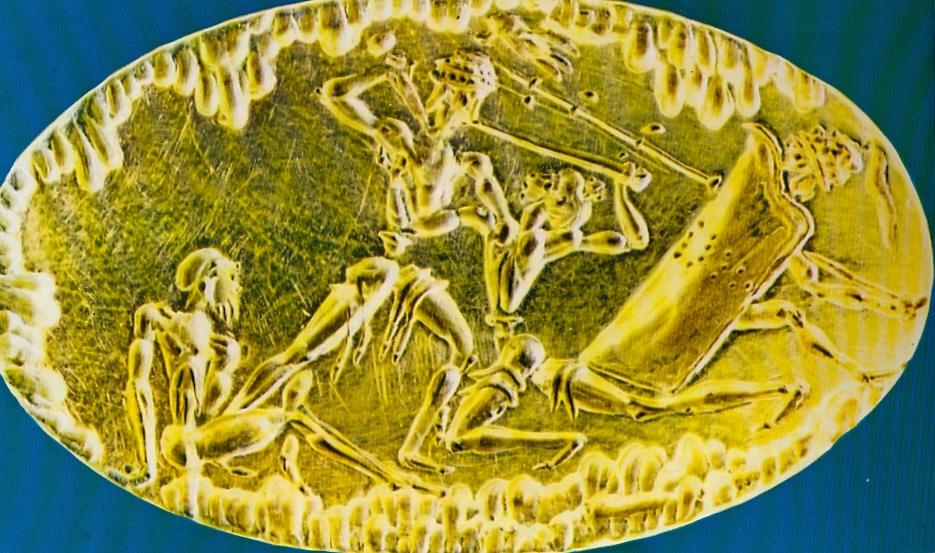
Mycenaean gold ring, from Grave circle, depicting a battle scene and demonstrating that warriors, traditionally, held weapons in their right hand. Which meant a shield would be held on their left arm.

Mycenae had a wall of large, irregular stones that were laid together without mortar. The walls of the citadel were expanded over the Late Helladic III (LH III) period, the reason believed to be regional competition. In the LH IIIB period, competition between regions led to the "enlargement" of the cities. This expansion not only included the creation of the Lion Gate and Postern Gate, but also the inclusion of Grave Circle A within the walls of the citadel. The Postern Gate in the back of the citadel was believed to be a back entrance for citizens from the surrounding area to enter in times of attack.

=== Lion Gate ===
The structure of the "main entrance" had a military attack advantage built into it. In order to enter, an invading army would have to turn right around a high bastion protruding out of the right side of the gate. Warriors of the period, traditionally, held their shields on their left arm and their weapons in their right hand, which is displayed in pieces from the time, including a gold ring with a battle scene. With the warriors' right sides facing the bastion, it allowed for Mycenaean people to open fire on the exposed side of the warriors. Another significant fact about the gate is that above the door, there were two figures of giant felines. Due to this fact, the entrance was appropriately named the "Lion Gate" Lions likely inhabited modern Greece during the Bronze Age, but were driven back to Thrace by the time of the Classical Age. The overall symbolism of the lions above the gate is not totally clear, but, it is believed that this was also inspired by the main entrance of Hattusa.

=== Cyclopean masonry ===
The masonry used to build the citadel wall surrounding Mycenae was constructed with limestone. Archaeologists believe the walls were inspired by the fortifications of the Hittite capital of Hattusa. When Greeks later discovered these fortifications, they believed them to be the work of the Cyclopes, due to the size and weight of these stones, too heavy to be lifted by an average human. Therefore, the stone walls' design was named Cyclopean masonry, due to the belief that these "giants" built the walls. The first "Cyclopean" wall was built in the Late Helladic IIIA period then expanded to include Grave Circle A in the LH IIIB period.

== Bibliography ==
- Neer, Richard T. “The Art and Archaeology of the Greek World.” The Art and Archaeology of the Greek World, London: Thames & Hudson, 2012, pp. 57–58. ISBN 978-0-500-28877-1
- A Dictionary of Greek and Roman Antiquities (1890), CAEMENTUM www.perseus.tufts.edu
- Neer, Richard T. “The Art and Archaeology of the Greek World.” The Art and Archaeology of the Greek World, London: Thames & Hudson, 2012, pp. 47. ISBN 978-0-500-28877-1
- Ring w/ Battle Scene. 1570-1500 B.C. Ethnikon Archaiologikon Mouseion (Greece). http://library.artstor.org/asset/ARTSTOR_103_41822000442101. Web. 3 Dec 2017.
