= Lion Gate =

Main entrance of the Bronze Age citadel of Mycenae

Coordinates: 37°43′51″N 22°45′22.2″E

- Πύλη των Λεόντων (Greek)
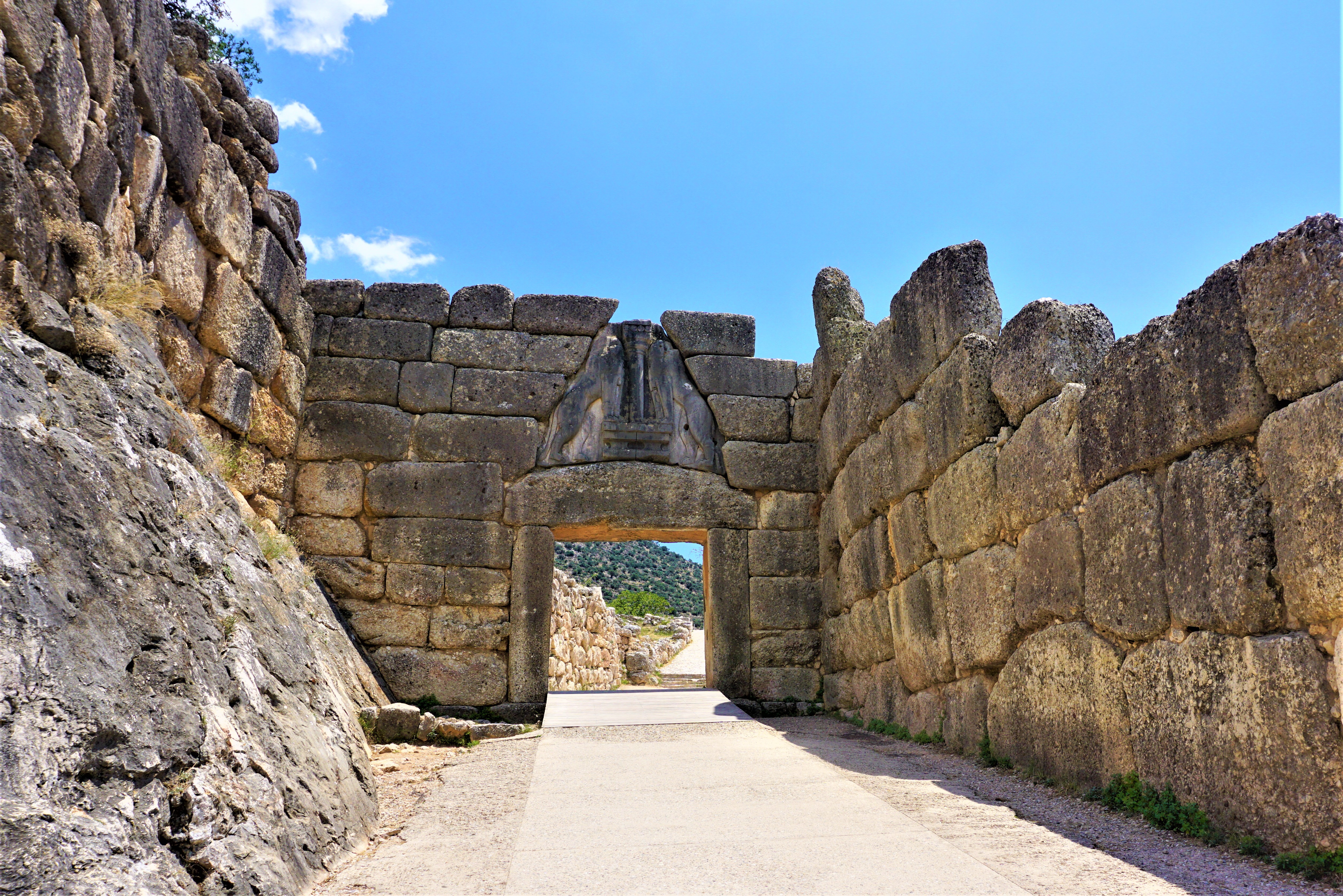
- Interactive map of Lion Gate
- Location: Mycenae

History
- Built: 1250 BC; 3276 years ago
- Built for: Main entrance of the Mycenae citadel

Site notes
- Area: Argolis, Greece
- Architectural style: Conglomerate Ashlar

The Lion Gate (Greek: Πύλη των Λεόντων) is the popular modern name for the main entrance of the Bronze Age citadel of Mycenae in Southern Greece. It was erected during the thirteenth century BC, around 1250 BC, in the northwestern side of the acropolis. In modern times, it was named after the relief sculpture of two lions or lionesses in a heraldic pose that stands above the entrance.

The gate is the sole surviving monumental piece of Mycenaean sculpture, as well as the largest surviving sculpture in the Bronze Age Aegean. It is the only monument of Bronze Age Greece to bear an iconographic motif that survived without being buried underground. It is the only relief image that was described in the literature of classical antiquity, such that it was well known prior to modern archaeology.

The Lion Gate is also a testimony of the presence of lions in Europe and Greece, before their disappearance in the late stages of Ancient history.

== Entrance ==
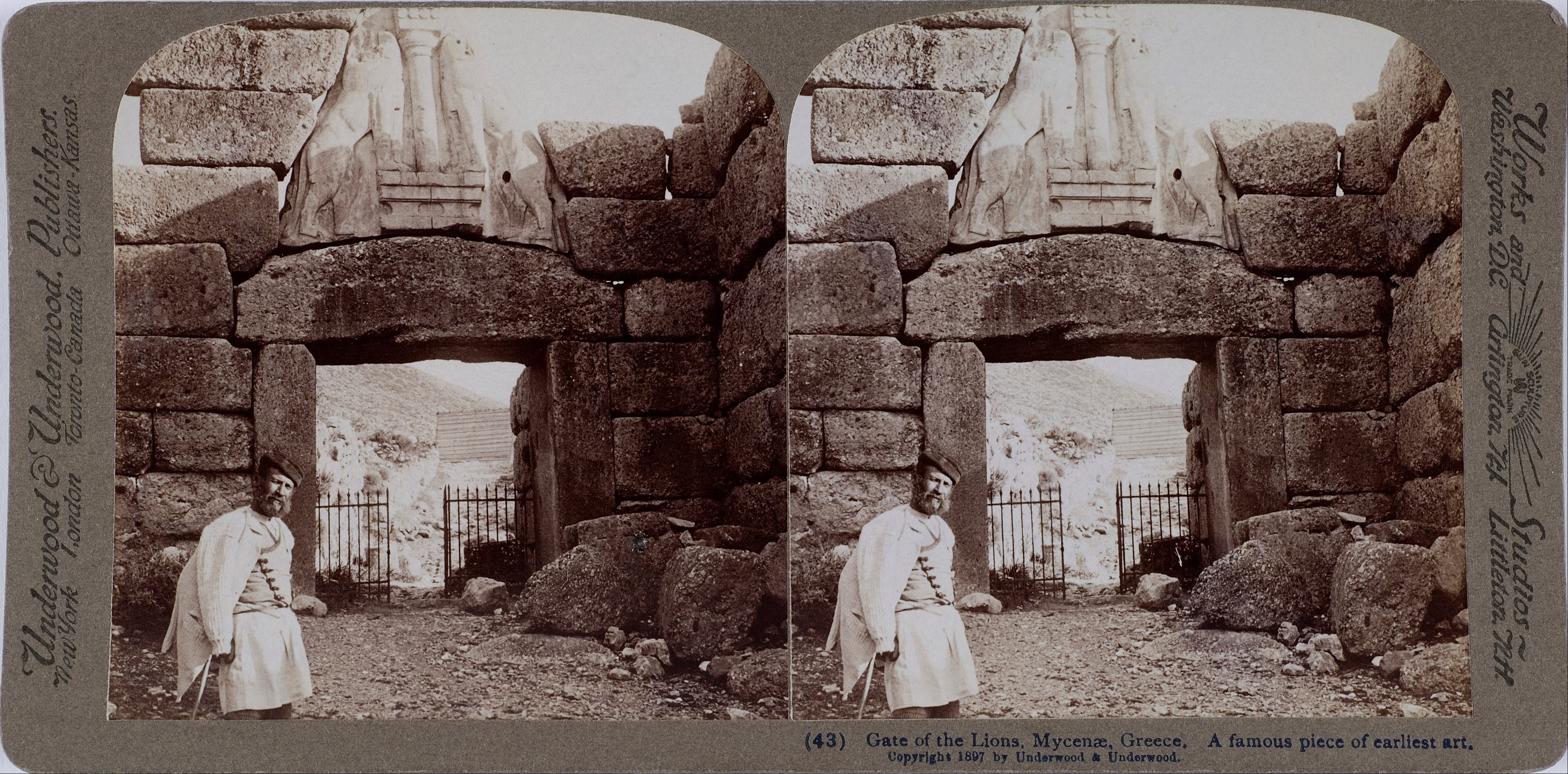
Stereoscopic image of the gate, photographed in 1897, showing portions of the wall that had collapsed and now have been replaced on the right side of the sculpture

The greater part of the cyclopean wall in Mycenae, including the gate, was built during the second extension of the citadel that occurred in the Late Helladic period IIIB (thirteenth century BC). At that time, the extended fortifications also enclosed inside the city wall Grave Circle A, a burial place for royal families during the sixteenth century BC. This grave circle was found east of this gate, where a peribolos wall also was built. After the expansion, Mycenae could be entered by two gates, a main entrance and a postern, while undoubtedly, the most extensive feature was the remodeling of the main entrance to the citadel, now known as the Lion Gate, in the northwestern side built circa 1250 BC.

The gate was approached by a partly natural, partly engineered ramp on a northwest-southeast axis. The eastern side of the approach is flanked by the steep smooth slope of the earlier enceinte. This was embellished with a new facade of conglomerate. On the western side a rectangular bastion was erected, 14.80 m (49 ft) long and 7.23 m (24 ft) wide, built in pseudo-ashlar style of enormous blocks of conglomerate. The term "Cyclopean" has been applied to the style to imply that the ancient structures had been built by the legendary race of giants whose culture was presumed to have preceded that of the Classical Greeks, as described in their myths. Between the wall and the bastion, the approach narrows to a small open courtyard measuring 15 m × 7.23 m (49 ft × 24 ft), possibly serving to limit the numbers of potential attackers on the gate. The bastion on the right side of the gate facilitated defensive actions against the right hand side of attackers, which would be vulnerable, as normally the attackers would carry their shields on their left arms. At the end of the approach stands the gate.

== Construction ==
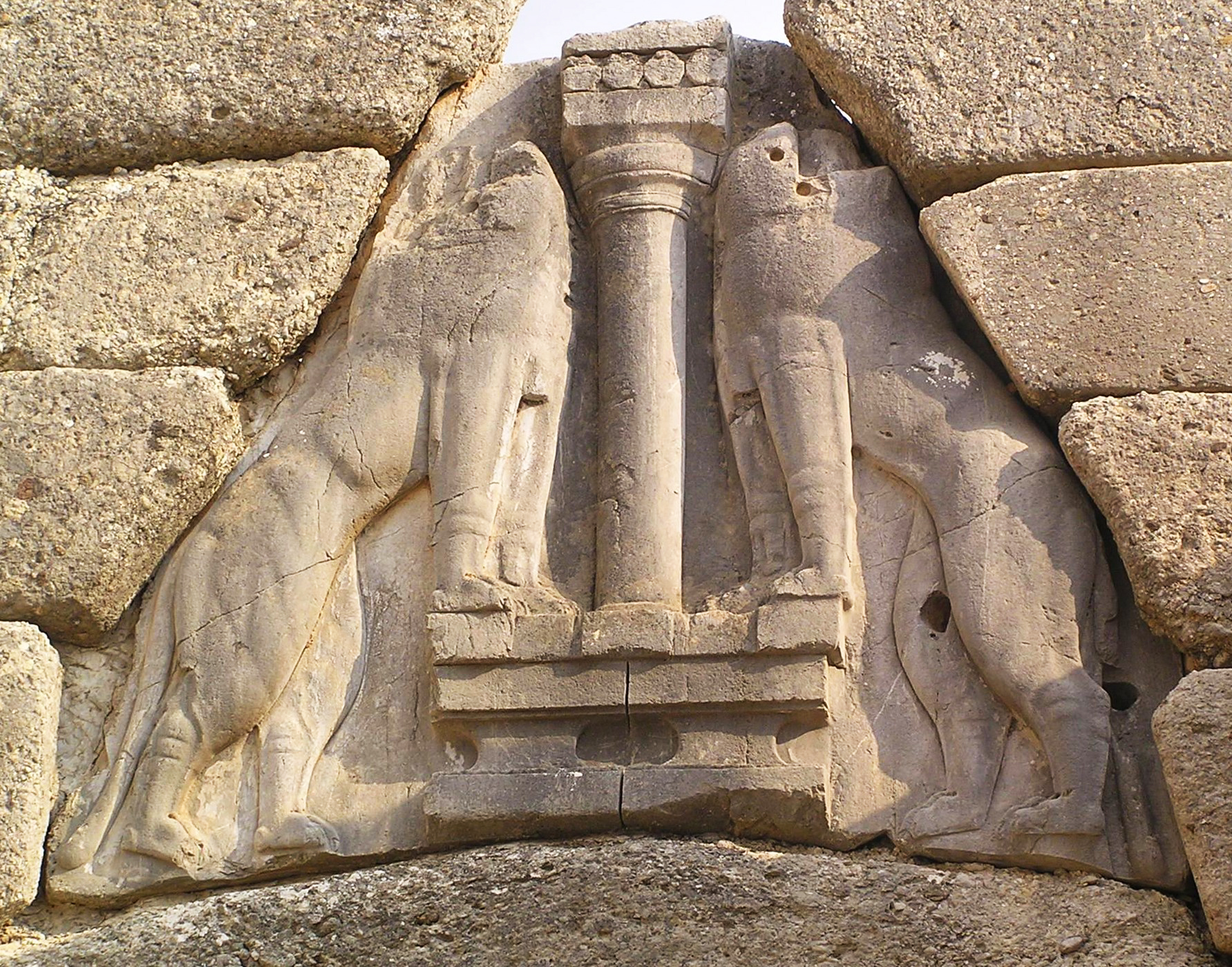
The confronting lionesses posing on both sides of a pillar above the lintel

The gate is a massive and imposing construction, standing 3.10 m (10 ft) wide and 2.95 m (10 ft) high at the threshold. It narrows as it rises, measuring 2.78 m (9 ft) below the lintel. The opening was closed by a double door mortised to a vertical beam that acted as a pivot around which the door revolved.

The gate consists of two great monoliths capped with a huge lintel that measures 4.5×2.0×0.8 m (15×7×3 ft). Above the lintel, the masonry courses form a corbelled arch, leaving an opening that lightens the weight carried by the lintel. This relieving triangle is a great limestone slab on which two confronted lionesses, carved in high relief, stand on either sides of a central pillar. The heads of the animals were fashioned separately and are missing, but their necks are present. The pillar, specifically, is a Minoan-type column that is located on top of an altar-like platform upon which the lionesses rest their front feet.

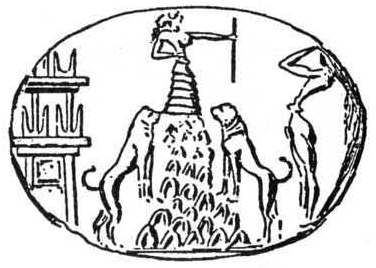
Early image found at Knossos depicting a goddess flanked by two lionesses (showing the tufts on their tails)

Early imagery of a deity that was found at Knossos presents a goddess flanked clearly by two lions or lionesses, establishing a continuity in religious imagery when later, the deity is represented abstractly by a column. It clearly identifies the species of feline, because of the characteristic tuft at the end of the tail, not present in any other feline species.

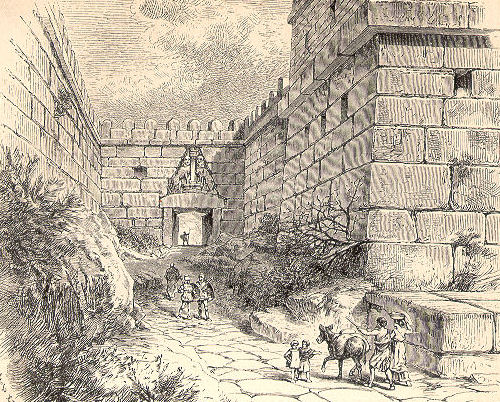
Reconstruction of how the citadel and its gate might have appeared in 1250 BC

The imposing gate of the citadel with the representation of the lionesses was an emblem of the Mycenaean kings and a symbol of their power to both subjects and foreigners. It also has been argued that the lions are a symbol of the goddess Hera.

This gate may be compared to the gates of the Hittite Bronze Age citadel of Hattusa, in Asia Minor. Since the heads of the animals were of a different material from their bodies and originally were fashioned to look toward those approaching below, a number of scholars have speculated that these might have been composite beasts, probably sphinxes, in the typical Middle Eastern tradition.

On the top of the pillar is a row of four discs, apparently representing rafters supporting a further piece of sculpture that has since been lost. Another view proposes: above the head of the column and what is probably a slab supporting an architrave is a row of discs (ends of transverse beams) and another slab the same size as the slab on top of the column. The beams and the block above them represent a more extended superstructure shortened here because of the diminishing space in the triangle. Thus, this author proposes that no further piece of sculpture has been lost.

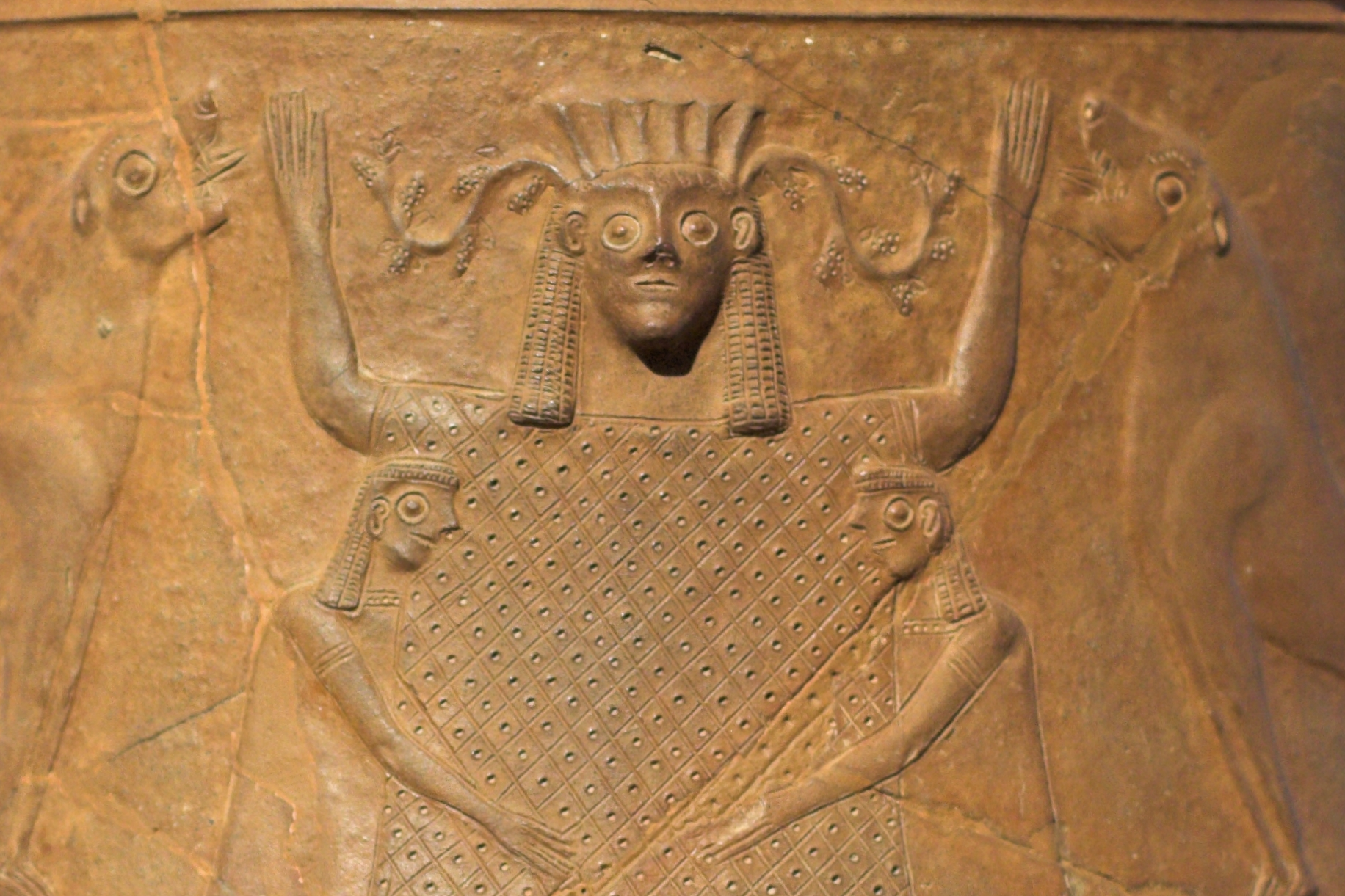
Goddess flanked by two lionesses on a pithos from Knossos

The design of the gate had precedents in other surviving artworks of the time; a similar design was depicted on fifteenth-century BC Minoan seals and a gem found at Mycenae. On a pithos from Knossos, the same imagery exists depicting a goddess flanked by two lionesses. Many other pieces of Mycenaean artwork share the same basic motif of two opposed animals separated by a vertical divider, such as two lambs facing a column and two sphinxes facing a sacred tree representing a deity. The architectural design in the gate relief may reflect an entrance of a type characterized by a central support, commonly a single column. More specifically, the gate relief may allude to the propylon (structure forming the entrance) that provides the main direct access to the palace. The lions acted as guardians to the entrance of the palace. If so, the symbol of a sanctified palace entrance would have appeared above the gate of the fortifications: a double blessing.

Beyond the gate and inside the citadel was a covered court with a small chamber, which probably functioned as a guard post. On the right, adjacent to the wall, was a building that has been identified as a granary because of the pithoi found there containing carbonized wheat.

== Excavations ==
External videos
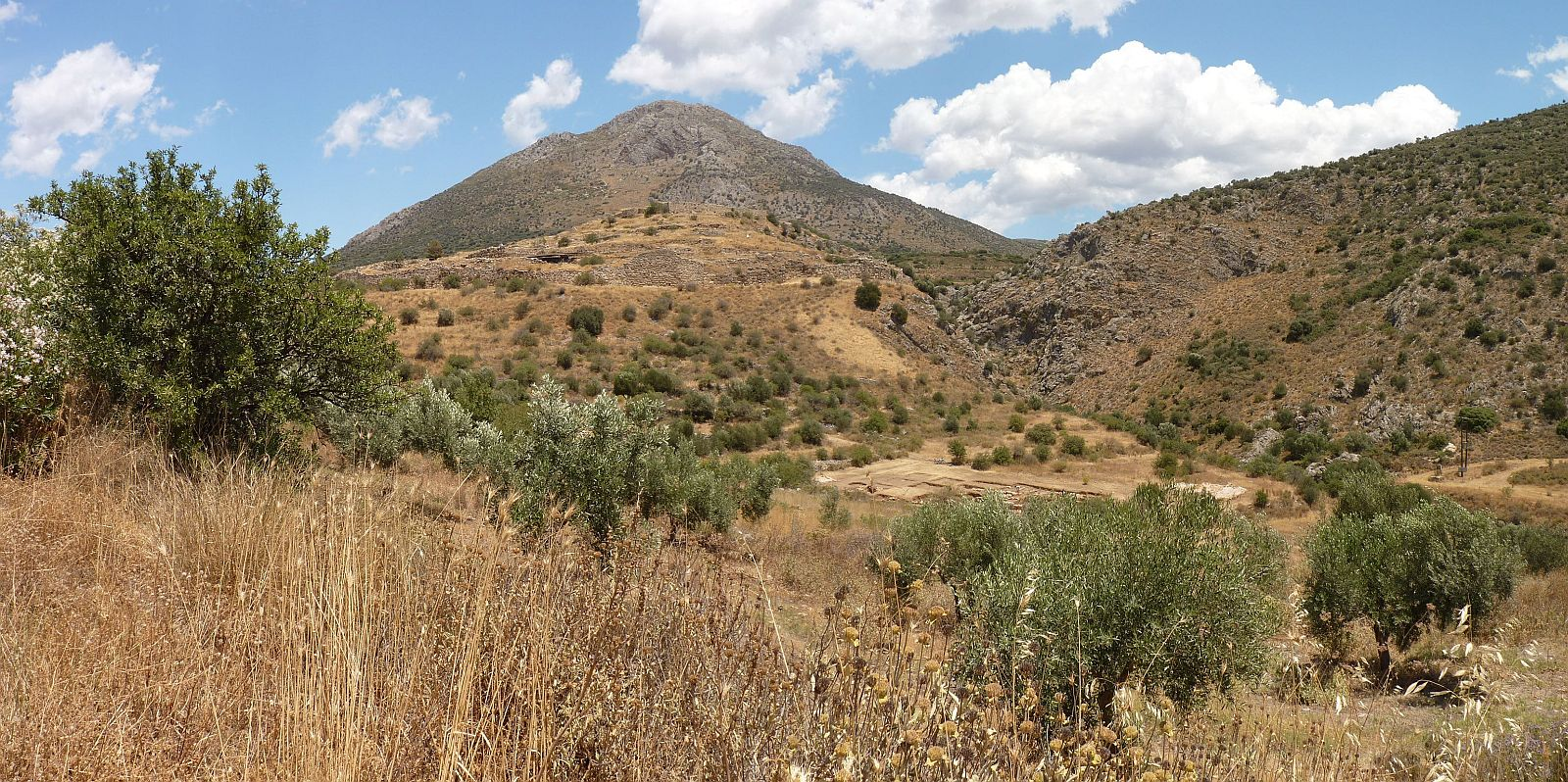
- Lion Gate, Mycenae, c. 1300-1250 B.C.E., Smarthistory

The gate stood in full view of visitors to Mycenae for centuries. It was mentioned by the ancient geographer Pausanias in the second century AD. The first correct identification of the gate in modern literature was during a survey conducted by Francesco Grimani, commissioned by the Provveditore Generale of the Kingdom of the Morea in 1700, who used Pausanias's description of the gate to identify the ruins of Mycenae.

In 1840, the Greek Archaeological Society undertook the initial clearing of the site from debris and soil that had accumulated to bury it, and in 1876 Heinrich Schliemann, guided by Pausanias's accounts, excavated the area south of the gate.

== See also ==
- Cyclopean masonry
- Grave Circle A, Mycenae
- History of lions in Europe
- Mycenaean civilization
- Royal Institute of British Architects, whose emblem is a modified representation of the gate sculpture
- Master of Animals
