= Teleboans =

People in Greek mythology

In Greek mythology, the Teleboans /təˈlɛboʊənz/ (Ancient Greek: Τηλεβόαι, Tēlebóai) were an Acarnanian tribe. They were said to descend from one Teleboas, a son of Pterelaus and brother of Taphius, the eponym of the Taphians. After dwelling for a time on the mainland, the Teleboans settled on the island of Taphos which was populated by their kinsmen. From the island the two tribes led piratical raids across Greece, and the names "Teleboan" and "Taphian" were later taken to refer to any inhabitant of Taphos. The Taphians and Teleboans murdered the brothers of Alcmene (to whom both tribes were related), a crime punished by her husband Amphitryon's sacking of their villages with the help of the Boeotians, Locrians and Phocians.
