= Car (mythology) =

Car or Kar (Ancient Greek: Κάρ) is a name in Greek mythology that refers to two characters who may or may not be one and the same.

- Car, king of Megara and son of Phoroneus by Cerdo. His tomb was located on the road from Megara to Corinth. From Car, the acropolis at Megara derived its name Caria where the 'Chamber of Demeter' was said to have been built by him when he was the king of the land.
- Car, king of Caria.
