= Lelex (king of Megara) =

Lelex, King of Megara (Greek Mythology)

In Greek mythology, Lelex (/ˈliːlɪks/; Ancient Greek: Λέλεξ gen. Λέλεγος) was a king of Megara and regarded as the ancestor of the Leleges.

== Family ==
Lelex was the son of Poseidon and Libya, the daughter of Epaphus. He was the father of Bias, Cleson, and possibly of Pterelaus. Lelex' successor, his son Cleson fathered Pylas who in turn begat Sciron, the Megarian warlord or otherwise, the malefactor of Theseus.

== Mythology ==
In the twelfth generation after Car (son of Phoroneus) reigned in the Carian land, Lelex immigrated from Egypt into Greece where he became king of Megara. His tomb was shown below Nisaea, the acropolis of Megara.

Regnal titles
Preceded by Car	King of Megara	Succeeded by Cleson
