= Neritus =

Neritus or Neritos (Ancient Greek: Νήρῐτος) may refer to:

- Neritus (Acarnania), a town of ancient Acarnania
- Nirito, a mountain near Kioni Bay
- Neritos, a junior synonym of a genus of moths, Trichromia
