= Taphius =

In Greek mythology, Taphius (Ancient Greek: Τάφιος) founded the city Taphos on the island of the same name, and was its king. He also gave his name to the Taphians, a people that inhabited Taphos and nearby islands, which formed part of Odysseus's kingdom at the time of the Trojan War.

== Family ==
According to one genealogy, Taphius was the son of Poseidon and Hippothoë (daughter of Mestor, son of Perseus). However, according to another (more plausible) genealogy, Taphius's father was Pterelaus, the son of Lelex, who ruled in Acarnania. Both versions agree that Taphius had a son, also called Pterelaus ('Pterelaus II') who was immortalized by Poseidon who planted a golden hair in his head.

== Mythology ==
Hippothoe was carried off by the god who brought her to the Echinadian Islands where he had intercourse with her. There she conceived Taphius who colonized Taphos and called the people Teleboans, because he had gone far from his native land (“telou ebē” τηλοῦ ἔβη means “he went far”).
