= Mneseus =

Figure of Greek myth

In Greek mythology, Mneseus (Ancient Greek: Μνησεύς) was one of the ten sons of Poseidon and Cleito in Plato's myth of Atlantis.

== Family ==
Mneseus was the elder brother of Autochton and his other siblings were Atlas and Eumelus, Ampheres and Evaemon, Elasippus and Mestor, and lastly, Azaes and Diaprepes.

== Mythology ==
Mneseus, along with his nine siblings, became the heads of ten royal houses, each ruling a tenth portion of the island, according to a partition made by Poseidon himself, but all subject to the supreme dynasty of Atlas who was the eldest of the ten.
