= Eumelus of Atlantis =

In Greek mythology, Eumelus (/juːˈmiːləs/; Ancient Greek: Εὔμηλος, romanized: Eúmēlos, lit. 'rich in sheep', 'having good flocks', or 'one who sings well'), also called Gadeirus (Ancient Greek: Γάδειρος, romanized: Gadeiros), was the younger twin brother of Atlas in Plato's myth of Atlantis.

== Family ==
Eumelus was the son of Poseidon and Cleito, daughter of the autochthon Evenor and Leucippe. His other brothers were: Ampheres and Evaemon, Mneseus and Autochthon, Elasippus and Mestor, and lastly, Azaes and Diaprepes.

== Mythology ==
Eumelus, along with his nine siblings, became the heads of ten royal houses, each ruling a tenth portion of the island, according to a partition made by Poseidon himself, but all subject to the supreme dynasty of Atlas who was the eldest of the ten.
