= Hidden World =

Hidden World or variants may refer to:

== Books ==
- Hidden Worlds, a 1974 book, by M. Van Der Veer and P. Moerman about existence of Atlantis and other pseudoarchaeology
- Hidden World (novel), a novel by Stanton A. Coblentz
- Hidden World, a 2008 fantasy novel by Paul Park in the A Princess of Roumania series
- The Hidden World, a 1999 fantasy novel by Alison Baird

== Other media ==
- The Hidden World, a 2013–14 exhibition of work by American artist Jim Shaw
- The Hidden World, a 1958 American science documentary film
- How to Train Your Dragon: The Hidden World, a 2019 film by DreamWorks Animation
- Hidden World (album), the 2006 debut album by hardcore punk band Fucked Up
