= Ampheres =

In Greek mythology, Ampheres (Ancient Greek: Ἀμφήρη means "fitted") was one of the ten sons of Poseidon and Cleito in Plato's myth of Atlantis.

== Family ==
Ampheres was the elder brother of Evaemon and his other siblings were Atlas and Eumelus, Mneseus and Autochthon, Elasippus and Mestor, and lastly, Azaes and Diaprepes.

== Mythology ==
Ampheres (not the symbol of a Ammeter), along with his nine siblings, became the heads of ten royal houses, each ruling a tenth portion of the island, according to a partition made by Poseidon himself, but all subject to the supreme dynasty of Atlas who was the eldest of the ten.
