= Euaemon =

In Greek mythology, Euaemon or Euaimon (Ancient Greek: Εὐαίμων) may refer to the following personages and a place:

- Euaemon, one of the ten sons of Poseidon and Cleito in Plato's myth of Atlantis. He was the younger brother of Ampheres and his other siblings were Atlas and Eumelus, Mneseus and Autochthon, Elasippus and Mestor, and lastly, Azaes and Diaprepes. Evaemon, along with his nine siblings, became the heads of ten royal houses, each ruling a tenth portion of the island, according to a partition made by Poseidon himself, but all subject to the supreme dynasty of Atlas who was the eldest of the ten.
- Euaemon, an Arcadian prince as one of the 50 sons of the impious King Lycaon either by the naiad Cyllene, Nonacris or by unknown woman. He and his brothers were the most nefarious and carefree of all people. To test them, Zeus visited them in the form of a peasant. These brothers mixed the entrails of a child into the god's meal, whereupon the enraged Zeus threw the meal over the table. Euaemon was killed, along with his brothers and their father, by a lightning bolt of the god.
- Euaemon, son of King Ormenus of Ormenium and thus, brother to Amyntor (otherwise also called his father). He was the father of Eurypylus by Deipyle (Deityche) or Ops.
- Euaemon, a city mentioned in Stephanus of Byzantium' s Ethnika, otherwise unknown
