= Evenor (Atlantis) =

Legendary ruler of Atlantis

Evenor (Ancient Greek: Εὐήνωρ Euenor means "joy of men") was the autochthonous father of Cleito by Leucippe.

== Mythology ==
In the Critias, a work of the Greek philosopher Plato, a man named Evenor is described as the ancestor of the kings who ruled the legendary island of Atlantis. According to the account given by Plato's character Critias, Evenor was among the original inhabitants of Atlantis born from the earth (autochthons). He lived with his wife Leucippe on a low hill in the centre of the island, about fifty stadia from the sea. The couple had one daughter, Cleito. When the maiden reached marriageable age, her parents died, but the god Poseidon slept with her and she became mother of five pairs of twin sons. Her oldest son, Atlas, became the first king of Atlantis, with the other sons as subordinate governors.
