= Byssa (mythology) =

Greek mythological woman

In Greek mythology, Byssa (Ancient Greek: Βύσσα, romanized: Bússa) is a Koan woman who refused to honour the deities Artemis, Athena and Hermes, and was turned into a bird for her impiety. Her tale survives in the works of Antoninus Liberalis.

== Family ==
Byssa was the daughter of Eumelus and the sister of Meropis and Agron.

== Mythology ==
Byssa with her family dwelled with Meropis on Kos island, and though they honored the local Koan goddess, they refused to venerate Artemis, Athena and Hermes. Every time the other islanders would invite them to a feast or sacrifice in honour of those gods they would refuse, on account of them hating grey eyes, owls, a goddess who was out at night, and thieves.

Artemis, Athena and Hermes paid them a visit one night, disguised as two countryside maidens and a shepherd. Hermes persuaded Agron and Eumelus to sacrifice to Hermes, Byssa and Meropis to the goddesses. They still denied however, so all four were turned into birds. Byssa became a byssa bird, sacred to the goddess Leucothea.

== Analysis ==
It has been suggested that the bird Byssa turned into is some sort of horned owl, given its resemblance to the words buza, buxa and buas (which refer to owls), but Francis Celoria noted that a bird sacred to Leucothea would surely have to be some sort of seabird, a shearwater or a gull.

== See also ==
- Polyphonte
- Myrrha
- Hippolytus of Athens

== Bibliography ==
- Antoninus Liberalis, The Metamorphoses of Antoninus Liberalis translated by Francis Celoria (Routledge 1992). Online version at the Topos Text Project.
- Celoria, Francis (1992). The Metamorphoses of Antoninus Liberalis: A Translation with a Commentary. Routledge. ISBN 0-415-06896-7.
