= Autochthon (Atlantis) =

Figure in Plato's myth of Atlantis

In Greek mythology, Autochthon (Ancient Greek: Αὐτόχθονα) was one of the ten sons of Poseidon and Cleito in Plato's myth of Atlantis. His name means "sprung from the land itself" which can be attributed to his grandfather Evenor who was an autochthon and one of original inhabitants of the land.

== Family ==
Autochthon was the younger brother of Mneseus and his other siblings were Atlas and Eumelus, Ampheres and Evaemon, Elasippus and Mestor, and lastly, Azaes and Diaprepes.

== Mythology ==
Autochthon, along with his nine siblings, became the heads of ten royal houses, each ruling a tenth portion of the island, according to a partition made by Poseidon himself, but all subject to the supreme dynasty of Atlas who was the eldest of the ten.
