= Azaes =

In Greek mythology, Azaes (Ancient Greek: Ἀζάης) was one of the ten sons of Poseidon and Cleito in Plato's myth of Atlantis.

== Family ==
Azaes was the elder brother of Diaprepes and his other siblings were Atlas and Eumelus, Ampheres and Evaemon, Mneseus and Autochthon, and lastly, Elasippus and Mestor.

== Mythology ==
Azaeas, along with his nine siblings, became the heads of ten royal houses, each ruling a tenth portion of the island, according to a partition made by Poseidon himself, but all subject to the supreme dynasty of Atlas who was the eldest of the ten.

== See also ==
- Aezeius
- Azeus
