= Agron (mythology) =

Son of Eumelus in Greek mythology

In Greek mythology, Agron (Ancient Greek: Ἄγρων, lit. 'wild' or 'rustic') was a son of Eumelus and brother of Byssa and Meropis.

== Mythology ==
The family dwelt at Meropis in Kos and worshipped Gaia, who rewarded them with all kinds of goods. However, they were quite impious towards other gods and never participated in religious festivals. Agron was especially disrespectful towards Athena, Artemis and Hermes, and whenever someone invited him or his sisters to take part in a ritual in honor of one of these gods, he would decline the invitation and scorn the deities.

Eventually, the three gods paid Agron a visit at night, Hermes being disguised as a shepherd, and Athena and Artemis as country maidens. Hermes invited Eumelus and Agron to a ritual feast in honor of himself, and suggested that they send Byssa and Meropis to the sacred grove of Athena and Artemis where other girls were gathering. On hearing this, Meropis began to ridicule the name of Athena, for which the goddess changed her into an owl. Byssa was transformed into a bird known as "byssa", sacred to Leucothea, and Agron was changed by Hermes into a plover. Eumelus began to scold Hermes for doing this to his son and got changed into a night raven, the bird which was believed to announce trouble.
