= Elasippus (mythology) =

Personage in Greek mythology

In Greek mythology, Elasippus (Ancient Greek: Ἐλάσιππον means 'horse-riding, knightly') may refer to two personages:

- Elasippus, one of the ten sons of Poseidon and Cleito in Plato's myth of Atlantis. He was the elder brother of Mestor and his other siblings were Atlas and Eumelus, Ampheres and Evaemon, Mneseus and Autochthon, and lastly, Azaes and Diaprepes. Elasippus, along with his nine siblings, became the heads of ten royal houses, each ruling a tenth portion of the island, according to a partition made by Poseidon himself, but all subject to the supreme dynasty of Atlas who was the eldest of the ten.
- Elasippus, son of Haemon and an Achaean soldier who participated in the Trojan War. He was slain by the Amazon queen, Penthesilia.
