= Cleito =

Two figures in Greek mythology

In Greek mythology, Cleito, also spelled Clitô or Clito (Ancient Greek: Κλειτώ, romanized: Kleitō, lit. 'renowned', 'famous' or 'glorious') may refer to the following:

- Cleito, an Atlantian, daughter of the autochthon Evenor and Leucippe. When she reached a marriageable age, both her parents died, and the sea-god Poseidon, after falling in love with Cleito married her. They had five pairs of twins, namely: Atlas and Eumelus, Ampheres and Evaemon, Mneseus and Autochthon, Elasippus and Mestor, and lastly, Azaes and Diaprepes.
- Cleito, mother of Hellus, one of the Trojan warriors who was killed by the Achaean leader Eurypylus during the siege of Troy.
