= Mestor =

Multiple Greek mythological figures

In Greek mythology, Mestor (/ˈmɛstər/; Ancient Greek: Μήστωρ, lit. 'adviser, counsellor') was the name of five men.

- Mestor, the son of Perseus and Andromeda, according to the mythographer Apollodorus. By Lysidice, daughter of Hippodamia and Pelops, he sired Hippothoe, who mothered Taphius by the god Poseidon.
- Mestor, a son of the king Pterelaus, and thus a great-grandson of the above.
- Mestor, a son of the king Priam. He is mentioned in the Iliad, where he, alongside Hector and Troilus, is praised in death by his father. In the Bibliotheca, Achilles kills him on Mount Ida. Dictys Cretensis also mentions his death, but later goes on to state that he was taken captive by Neoptolemus, who later dressed up in Mestor's Phrygian clothes to deceive Acastus.
- In Plato's Critias, Mestor was the second of the fourth set of twins borne of Poseidon and the mortal, Cleito, and one of the first princes of Atlantis. His older twin brother was Elasippus, and his other siblings were Atlas and Eumelus, Ampheres and Evaemon, Mneseus and Autochthon, and lastly, Azaes and Diaprepes. Mestor, along with his nine siblings, became the heads of ten royal houses, each ruling a tenth portion of the island, according to a partition made by Poseidon himself, but all subject to the supreme dynasty of Atlas who was the eldest of the ten.
- Mestor, son of Ajax. He was a follower of Agamemnon, and, upon his return from Troy, was killed at a feast alongside Alcmeon and a third unnamed man by supporters of Clytemnestra and Aegisthus named Antiochus and Argeios.
