= Meropis (mythology) =

Greek mythological woman

In Greek mythology, Meropis (Ancient Greek: Μεροπὶς, romanized: Meropis) is a Koan woman who refused to honour the deities Artemis, Athena and Hermes, and was turned into a bird for her impiety. Her tale survives in the works of Antoninus Liberalis.

== Family ==
Meropis was the daughter of Eumelus and the sister of Byssa and Agron.

== Mythology ==
Meropis with her family dwelled in Meropis on Kos island, and though they honored the local Koan goddess, they refused to venerate three of the major gods, Artemis, Athena and Hermes. Every time the other Koans would invite the family to a feast or sacrifice in honour of those three gods they would refuse, on account of them hating grey eyes, owls, a goddess who was out at night, and thieves.

Angered, Artemis, Athena and Hermes paid them a visit one night, disguised as two countryside maidens and a shepherd. Hermes persuaded the men, Agron and Eumelus, to sacrifice to Hermes, Byssa and Meropis to the goddesses. They still denied however, so all four were turned into birds. The moment Meropis heard the word 'Athena', she scoffed, so the goddess turned her into an owl.

== See also ==
- Polyphonte
- Myrrha
- Hippolytus of Athens

== Bibliography ==
- Antoninus Liberalis, The Metamorphoses of Antoninus Liberalis translated by Francis Celoria (Routledge 1992). Online version at the Topos Text Project.
- Celoria, Francis (1992). The Metamorphoses of Antoninus Liberalis: A Translation with a Commentary. Routledge. ISBN 0-415-06896-7.
