= Hidden Worlds =

1974 book by M. Van Der Veer and P. Moerman

- Publisher: Bantam Books
- Publication date: 1974

Hidden Worlds: Fresh Clues to the Past is the English title of a 1974 book, a translation of a book originally in Dutch, by M. Van Der Veer and P. Moerman, that suggests the existence of a previously unidentified ancient civilization that was subsequently destroyed by a natural disaster.

Hidden Worlds: Fresh Clues to the Past is a rejection of Von Daniken's theories; however, Der Veer and P.Moerman concede the existence of Atlantis. The book contests orthodox history, claiming international settlement in the Americas prior to European colonization of the region by Christopher Columbus in 1492.

P. Moerman afterwards distanced himself with emphasis from the book, as it had become under the influence of its publisher almost as pseudo-scientific as the publications of Van Daniken and his associates that it hackled (in The Netherlands the book was published by the same publishing company as the works of the authors that they attacked as "cosmidiots"), had been a professional painter until 1969. Van der Veer held all kinds of odd jobs and enterprises, amongst others Kirlian photography and its paranormal claims. None of both held academic-level scientific qualifications or credentials; subsequently, reviewers criticized their work as pseudoarchaeology.

From P.Moerman, in 1977 a serious comprehensive and elaborate monography in Dutch appeared, by a completely different publisher, on his own personal field of interest paleoanthropology -in which he was generally respected as a self-educated expert in spite of lacking a formal academic background- specifically about the Neanderthals, "Op het spoor van de Neanderthalmens" ("On the tracks of Neanderthal Man"). On this book that properly conformed with established scientific insights and principles, he had been working solely since 1960. That well-wrought monography had nothing in common with the sensational and speculative slant of the two previous books with Van der Veer, who was his brother-law. This book about the Neanderthals was well received by scholars in the field and its content was clearly averse from the pseudo-scientific speculation that was typical for "Hidden Worlds".
