= Edith Willis Linn Forbes =

American poet

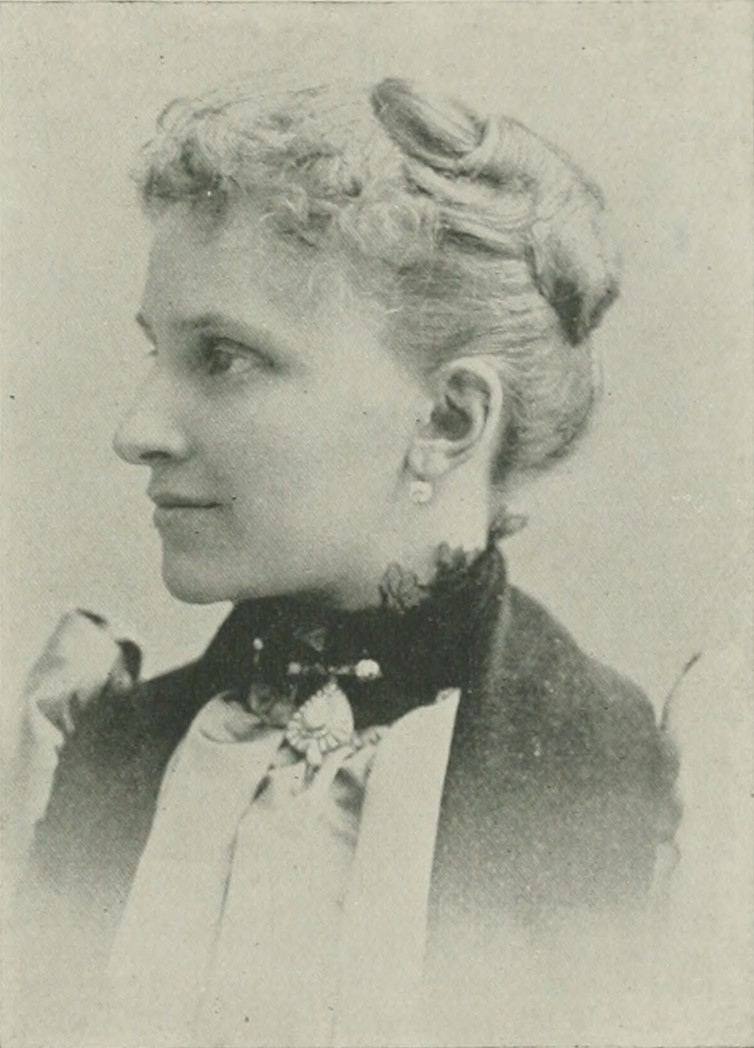
- Photo in A Woman of the Century
- Born: Edith Willis; February 19, 1865; New York City, U.S.
- Died: September 29, 1945 (aged 80); Starkey, New York, U.S.
- Resting place: Mount Hope Cemetery, Rochester, New York, U.S.
- Occupations: poet; writer
- Spouses: Samuel H. Linn (m. 1886; died 1916); George Mather Forbes (m. 1918–1934)
- Children: 2
- Writing career
- Pen name: E. W. L.
- Notable work: Poems

Signature
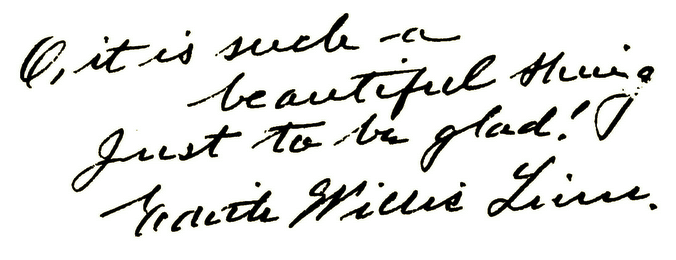

Edith Willis Linn Forbes (née, Willis; after first marriage, Linn; after second marriage, Forbes; pen name, E. W. L.; February 19, 1865 – September 29, 1945) was an American poet and writer. Active in clubs, she founded the Rochester Poetry Society, and served as president. Forbes contributed to The Christian Register, the Cottage Hearth, the Christian Union, the Boston Transcript, Godey's Lady's Book, Peterson's Magazine, the Kew Moon, the Century, and other prominent periodicals. Forbes published a volume of Poems in 1891. Her poem "Restless Heart Don't Worry So," was translated into French, Russian and German, widely circulated in England and the U.S. and set to music by three different composers.

== Early life and education ==
Edith Willis was born in New York City, February 19, 1865. She was a daughter of Dr. Frederic Llewellyn Hovey Willis (1853-1934), who was a member of the family of N. P. Willis, and who formerly practiced medicine in New York. Her mother was Love Maria Whitcomb (1824–1908), who was well known some years ago as a writer of juvenile stories. Both parents were inclined to literature, and the daughter inherited the literary inclination.

When Forbes was six years old, the family went to Glenora, New York, on Seneca Lake, for the summers, and to Boston, Massachusetts, for the winters. In Boston, she was educated in private schools until she was eighteen years old, after which her education was conducted by private tutors.

== Career ==
Since the age of eleven, she preserved all her compositions, and by 1893, the number was nearly 400. She wrote very little in prose, a few short stories descriptive of nature. Forbes was proficient in French, German and English literature and music. She contributed to The Christian Register, the Cottage Hearth, the Christian Union, the Boston Transcript, Godey's Lady's Book, Peterson's Magazine, the Kew Moon, the Century, and other prominent periodicals. She published a volume of Poems (Buffalo, New York, 1891).

In 1920, she established the Rochester Poetry Society, and served as president. She also affiliated with the Women's Education and Industrial Union, the Daughters of the American Revolution, and the Door of Hope.

== Personal life ==
In 1886, in New York City, she married Dr. Samuel Henry Linn (1843-1916), who served at the court of Czar Nicholas II of Russia as the official dentist, and after his permanent return to the U.S., resided in Rochester, New York. They had two sons, Willis (1887-1927) and Benjamin Franklin Linn (1890-1923). She traveled in Europe and through the United States after this marriage.

On September 28, 1918, in New York City, she married for a second time, George Mather Forbes (1853-1934), a faculty member of the University of Rochester.

Forbes made her home in Rochester, New York. She died in Starkey, New York, September 29, 1945; burial was at Mount Hope Cemetery, Rochester.

== Selected works ==
=== Books by Edith Willis Linn ===
- Poems, 1892
- Out of the deep; pen pictures in prose and verse, 1895
- Within, above, beyond, 1899
- A Cycle of Sonnets, 1918

=== Books by E. W. L. & H. B. ===
- Alcott memoirs : posthumously comp. from papers, journals and memoranda of the late Dr. Frederick L.H. Willis, 1915

=== Songs ===
- "We are coming : marching song of America", 1918 (lyrics by Edith Willis Linn; composed by John Philip Sousa)
