= Alison Baird =

Canadian writer (born 1963)

- Born: 1963 (age 62–63)
- Occupation: Author
- Writing career
- Genre: Children's literature
- Website: alisonbaird.net

Alison Baird (born 1963) is a Canadian writer. Her works include The Dragon's Egg (1994), White as the Waves (1999), The Tales of Annwn, the Willowmere Chronicles trilogy, and The Dragon Throne trilogy. She was honoured by the Canadian Children's Book Centre, and was a finalist for the 1996 Silver Birch Award, and she was a finalist for the IODE Violet Downey Book Award.

Baird attended the University of Toronto's Trinity College, where she earned a Bachelor of Arts Honours in English, as well as a Master of Arts.

She lives in Oakville, Ontario.

== Publications ==
=== Novels ===
==== The Dragon Throne trilogy ====
- The Stone of the Stars. New York: Aspect. 2004. ISBN 978-0-446-69098-0.
- The Empire of the Stars. Aspect. 2005. ISBN 9780446613019.
- The Archons of the Stars. Aspect. 2005. ISBN 9780446690973.

==== Werewolves of Quebec ====
- House of the Wolf (2017)
- The Way of the Wolf (2025)

=== Young adult novels ===
==== The Tales of Annwn duo ====
- The Hidden World. Viking. 1999. ISBN 9780670882212.
- The Wolves Of Woden. Puffin Canada. 2002. ISBN 9780141311807.

==== Willowmere Chronicles trilogy ====
- The Witches of Willowmere. Penguin Canada. 2002. ISBN 9780141313733.
- The Warding of Willowmere. Penguin Canada. 2004. ISBN 9780143015291.
- The Wyrd of Willowmere. Penguin Canada. 2005. ISBN 9780143015314.

=== Middle grade novels ===
- The Dragon's Egg. Illustrated by Frances Tyrrell. Scholastic Canada. 1994. ISBN 9780590241816.
- White As the Waves. Creative Book Publishers. 1999. ISBN 9781894294034.
- The Adventures of Robert and Mel (2011)
- The Apprentice Dragons (2017)
- A Country of Their Own (2017)
