= Diaprepes (mythology) =

Pair of twins borne to Poseidon and Cleito in Greek mythology

In Greek mythology, Diaprepes (Ancient Greek: Διαπρέπης means "distinguished") was the youngest of the five pairs of twins borne of Poseidon and Cleito in Plato's myth of Atlantis.

== Family ==
Diaprepes was the younger brother of Azaes and his older siblings were Atlas and Eumelus, Mneseus and Autochthon, Elasippus and Mestor, and lastly, Elasippus and Mestor.

== Mythology ==
Diaprepes, along with his nine siblings, became the heads of ten royal houses, each ruling a tenth portion of the island, according to a partition made by Poseidon himself, but all subject to the supreme dynasty of Atlas who was the eldest of the ten.
