= Eumelus =

Ancient Greek name

Eumelus (/juːˈmiːləs/; Ancient Greek: Εὔμηλος, romanized: Eúmēlos, lit. 'rich in sheep', 'having good flocks', or 'one who sings well' ) was the name of:

== Mythology ==
- Eumelus, one of the 10 first kings of Atlantis in Plato's myth.
- Eumelus, son of Merops and father of Byssa, Meropis and Agron. The family offended Hermes and were transformed into birds.
- Eumelus, companion of Triptolemus. He had a son Antheias who tried to ride the chariot of Triptolemus but fell off and died. Eumelus was the first to settle in the land of Patrae in Achaea and founded Antheia in memory of his son.
- Eumelus, son of Eugnotus and father of Botres. He killed his son for having eaten the brains of a sheep that had been sacrificed before it had been put on the altar.
- Eumelus, succeeded his father Admetus as the King of Pherae, and his mother was Alcestis, daughter of King Pelias of Iolcus. Eumelus married Iphthime, daughter of Icarius of Sparta, and possibly by her, became the father of Zeuxippus. Eumelus was one of the "suitors of Helen" and thus, led Pherae and Iolcus in the Trojan War on the side of the Greeks. Although one of the best Achaean charioteers, he was the fifth and last in the chariot races because of Athena's sabotage at Patroclus's funeral. Eumelus was also one of the Greeks in the Trojan Horse.
- Eumelus, also known as Eumeles or Eumedes, a herald and father of Dolon and five girls.
- Eumelus, a companion of Aeneas. This is the man who brought the news that the fleet of the hero in Sicily was on fire
- Eumelus, one of the Suitors of Penelope who came from Same along with other 22 wooers. He, with the other suitors, was shot dead by Odysseus with the aid of Eumaeus, Philoetius, and Telemachus.

== History ==
- Eumelus of Corinth, an epic poet of the second half of the 8th century BC
