= Nycteus =

Greek mythological Theban king

In Greek mythology, Nycteus (/ˈnɪktjuːs/; Greek: Νυκτεύς, romanized: Nukteús, lit. 'nocturnal') was a king of Thebes. His rule began after the death of Polydorus, and ended when he was succeeded by his brother Lycus.

== Family ==
Nycteus and his brother Lycus were the sons of either Chthonius, one of the Spartoi, or of the nymph Clonia and Hyrieus, the son of Poseidon and the Atlantid Alkyone, or of Poseidon and the Pleiad Celaeno. Nycteus had two daughters by Polyxo, Nycteis and Antiope.

== Mythology ==
Nycteus and Lycus fled from Euboea after they murdered King Phlegyas, settling in Hyria and then moving to Thebes, because they were friends with Pentheus, its king. Nycteus's daughter, Nycteis married Polydorus, who was the successor of Pentheus, and their son was Labdacus. However, Pentheus and Polydorus both died soon after, and Nycteus became regent for Labdacus.

After Antiope was impregnated by Zeus and fled to marry king Epopeus in Sicyon, the Bibliotheca reports that Nycteus killed himself in shame, after asking Lycus to punish her. Pausanias, however, states that Nycteus led the Thebans against Epopeus, but was wounded and carried back to Thebes, where he died after asking Lycus to continue the battle. Lycus succeeded him as regent of Thebes.

Regnal titles
Preceded by Polydorus	Regent of Thebes	Succeeded by Lycus

== Theban royal family tree ==
Royal house of Thebes family tree
- Solid lines indicate descendants.
- Dashed lines indicate marriages.
- Dotted lines indicate extra-marital relationships or adoptions.
- Kings of Thebes are numbered with bold names and a light purple background.
  - Joint rules are indicated by a number and lowercase letter, for example, 5a. Amphion shared the throne with 5b. Zethus.
- Regents of Thebes are alphanumbered (format AN) with bold names and a light red background.
  - The number N refers to the regency preceding the reign of the N^{th} king. Generally this means the regent served the N^{th} king but not always, as Creon (A9) was serving as regent to Laodamas (the 10th King) when he was slain by Lycus II (the usurping 9th king).
  - The letter A refers to the regency sequence. "A" is the first regent, "B" is the second, etc.
- Deities have a yellow background color.

Harmonia	1. Cadmus	Polyxo	A4. Nycteus (Regent)	Dirce	B4 & A6. Lycus (Regent)
Zeus	Zeus
Ino	Agave	Echion	3. Polydorus	Nycteis	Antiope
Semele	Autonoë
Dionysus	2. Pentheus	Epeiros	4. Labdacus	5a. Amphion	5b. Zethus
Menoeceus
Eurydice	A7, A8 & A9. Creon (Regent)	Jocasta	6. Laius	Merope	Polybus
Hipponome	Alcaeus
Zeus
Alcmene	Amphitryon	Perimede	7. Oedipus
Megara	Heracles	Iphicles	Anaxo
Henioche	Megareus	Haemon	Antigone	8b. Eteocles	Argea	8a. Polynices
Pyrrha	Lycomedes	Ismene	9. Lycus II
A12. Peneleos (Regent)	10. Laodamas	Demonassa	11. Thersander
Opheltes	12. Tisamenus
14. Damasichthon	13. Autesion
15. Ptolemy	Theras	Argeia	Aristodemus
16. Xanthos	Eurysthenes	Procles
