= Lycus (son of Lycus) =

In Greek mythology, Lycus (/ˈlaɪkəs/ LY-kəs; Ancient Greek: Λύκος, romanized: Lúkos, lit. 'wolf') was the son of King Lycus of Thebes, the brother of Nycteus. He appeared in Euripides's Heracles.

== Genealogy ==
Royal house of Thebes family tree
- Solid lines indicate descendants.
- Dashed lines indicate marriages.
- Dotted lines indicate extra-marital relationships or adoptions.
- Kings of Thebes are numbered with bold names and a light purple background.
  - Joint rules are indicated by a number and lowercase letter, for example, 5a. Amphion shared the throne with 5b. Zethus.
- Regents of Thebes are alphanumbered (format AN) with bold names and a light red background.
  - The number N refers to the regency preceding the reign of the N^{th} king. Generally this means the regent served the N^{th} king but not always, as Creon (A9) was serving as regent to Laodamas (the 10th King) when he was slain by Lycus II (the usurping 9th king).
  - The letter A refers to the regency sequence. "A" is the first regent, "B" is the second, etc.
- Deities have a yellow background color.

Harmonia	1. Cadmus	Polyxo	A4. Nycteus (Regent)	Dirce	B4 & A6. Lycus (Regent)
Zeus	Zeus
Ino	Agave	Echion	3. Polydorus	Nycteis	Antiope
Semele	Autonoë
Dionysus	2. Pentheus	Epeiros	4. Labdacus	5a. Amphion	5b. Zethus
Menoeceus
Eurydice	A7, A8 & A9. Creon (Regent)	Jocasta	6. Laius	Merope	Polybus
Hipponome	Alcaeus
Zeus
Alcmene	Amphitryon	Perimede	7. Oedipus
Megara	Heracles	Iphicles	Anaxo
Henioche	Megareus	Haemon	Antigone	8b. Eteocles	Argea	8a. Polynices
Pyrrha	Lycomedes	Ismene	9. Lycus II
A12. Peneleos (Regent)	10. Laodamas	Demonassa	11. Thersander
Opheltes	12. Tisamenus
14. Damasichthon	13. Autesion
15. Ptolemy	Theras	Argeia	Aristodemus
16. Xanthos	Eurysthenes	Procles

== Mythology ==
Originally from Euboea, Lycus seized power in Ancient Thebes (Boeotia) by killing King Creon who at the time was regent for the son of Eteocles, Laodamas. Lycus mistreated Creon's family, throwing them out of their house and depriving them food and clothing. However, Creon was the father-in-law of the hero Heracles, who returned unexpectedly to Thebes and slew Lycus. Laodamas succeeded him as king.

Regnal titles
Preceded by Creon	King of Thebes	Succeeded by Laodamas
