= Labdacus =

Mythological king of Thebes

In Greek mythology, Labdacus /ˈlæbdəkəs/ (Ancient Greek: Λάβδακος, romanized: Lábdakos, lit. 'lame' or 'defective in the legs') was the only son of Polydorus and a king of Thebes. Labdacus was a grandson of Thebes's founder, Cadmus. His mother was Nycteïs, daughter of Nycteus.

== Mythology ==
Polydorus died while Labdacus was a child, leaving Nycteus as his regent, although Lycus soon replaced him in that office. When Labdacus had grown, he briefly ruled Thebes. He died while he was still young, after he lost a war with the king of Athens, Pandion, over their borders. Apollodorus writes that he, like his cousin Pentheus, was ripped apart by women in a bacchic frenzy for disrespect to the god Dionysus. Lycus became regent once more after his death, this time for Labdacus's son, Laius. His descendants were called the Labdacids, and included his son Laius, who fathered Oedipus; Oedipus's children were Polynices, Eteocles, Antigone, and Ismene.

== Family tree of Theban Royal House ==
Royal House of Thebes
- Solid lines indicate descendants.
- Dashed lines indicate marriages.
- Dotted lines indicate extra-marital relationships or adoptions.
- Kings of Thebes are numbered with bold names and a light purple background.
  - Joint rules are indicated by a number and lowercase letter, for example, 5a. Amphion shared the throne with 5b. Zethus.
- Regents of Thebes are alphanumbered (format AN) with bold names and a light red background.
  - The number N refers to the regency preceding the reign of the N^{th} king. Generally this means the regent served the N^{th} king but not always, as Creon (A9) was serving as regent to Laodamas (the 10th King) when he was slain by Lycus II (the usurping 9th king).
  - The letter A refers to the regency sequence. "A" is the first regent, "B" is the second, etc.
- Deities have a yellow background color.

Harmonia	1. Cadmus	Polyxo	A4. Nycteus (Regent)	Dirce	B4 & A6. Lycus (Regent)
Zeus	Zeus
Ino	Agave	Echion	3. Polydorus	Nycteis	Antiope
Semele	Autonoë
Dionysus	2. Pentheus	Epeiros	4. Labdacus	5a. Amphion	5b. Zethus
Oclasus
Menoeceus
Eurydice	A7, A8 & A9. Creon (Regent)	Jocasta	6. Laius	Merope	Polybus
Hipponome	Alcaeus
Zeus
Alcmene	Amphitryon	Perimede	7. Oedipus
Megara	Heracles	Iphicles	Anaxo
Henioche	Megareus	Haemon	Antigone	8b. Eteocles	Argea	8a. Polynices
Pyrrha	Lycomedes	Ismene	9. Lycus II
A12. Peneleos (Regent)	10. Laodamas	Demonassa	11. Thersander
Opheltes	12. Tisamenus
14. Damasichthon	13. Autesion
15. Ptolemy	Theras	Argeia	Aristodemus
16. Xanthos	Eurysthenes	Procles

Regnal titles
Preceded by Lycus (as regent)	King of Thebes	Succeeded by Lycus
