= Pentheus =

Greek mythological king of Thebes

- King of Thebes
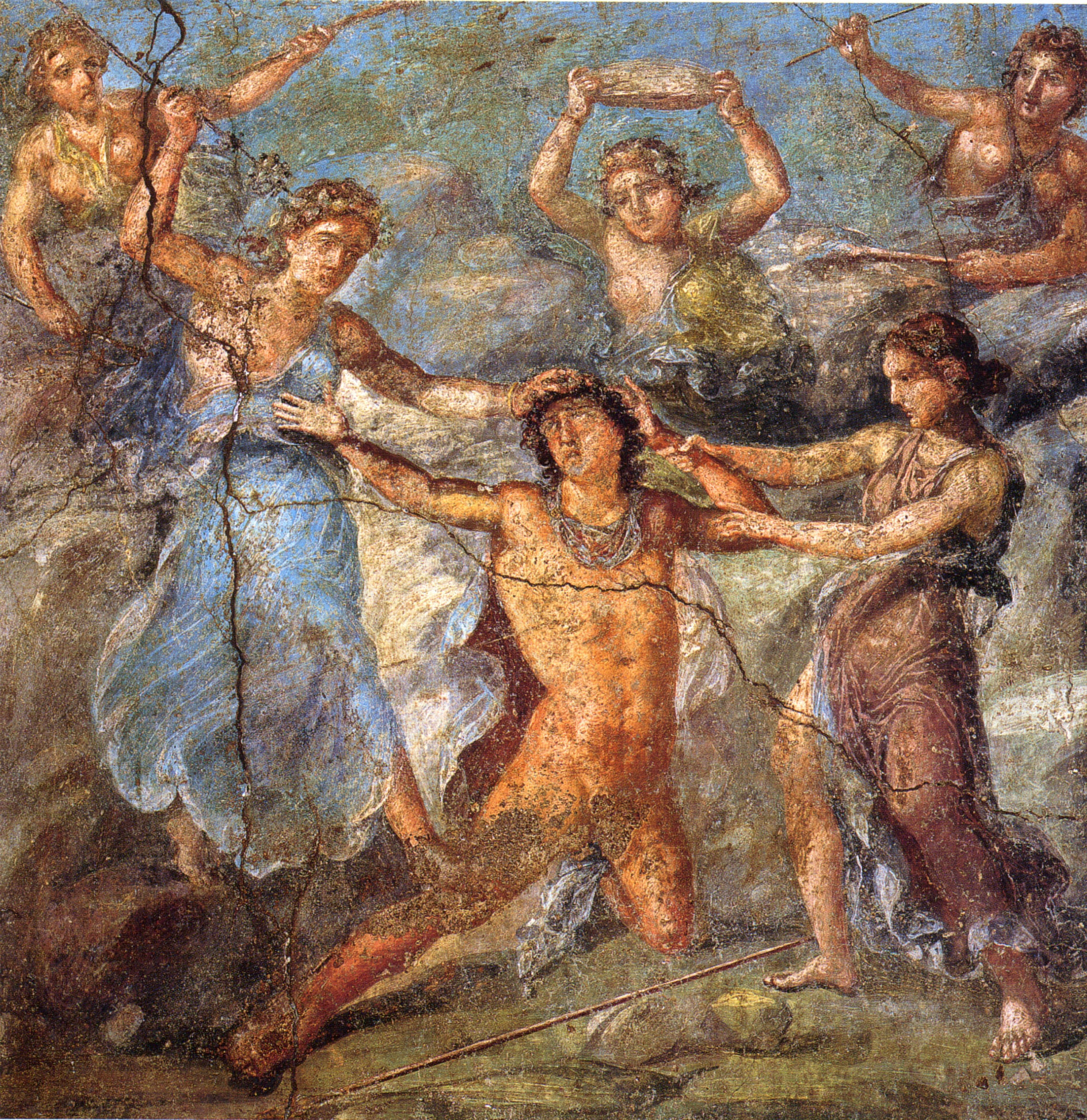
- Abode: Thebes

Genealogy
- Parents: Echion and Agave
- Siblings: Epeiros
- Children: Oclasus

In Greek mythology, Pentheus (/ˈpɛnθjuːs/; Ancient Greek: Πενθεύς, romanized: Pentheús) was a king of Thebes. His father was Echion, the wisest of the Spartoi. His mother was Agave, the daughter of Cadmus, the founder of Thebes, and grandson of the goddess Harmonia. His sister was Epeiros and his son was Oclasus, father of Menoeceus.

Much of what is known about the character comes from the interpretation of the myth in Euripides' tragic play, The Bacchae.

== Mythological biography ==
The story of Pentheus' resistance to Dionysus and his subsequent punishment is presented by Euripides as follows. Cadmus, the king of Thebes, abdicated due to his old age in favour of his grandson Pentheus. Pentheus soon banned the worship of the god Dionysus, who was the son of his aunt Semele, and forbade the women of Cadmeia to partake in his rites. An angered Dionysus caused Pentheus' mother Agave and his aunts Ino and Autonoë, along with all the other women of Thebes, to rush to Mount Cithaeron in a Bacchic frenzy. Accordingly, Pentheus imprisoned Dionysus, thinking the man simply a follower, but his chains fell off and the jail doors opened for him.

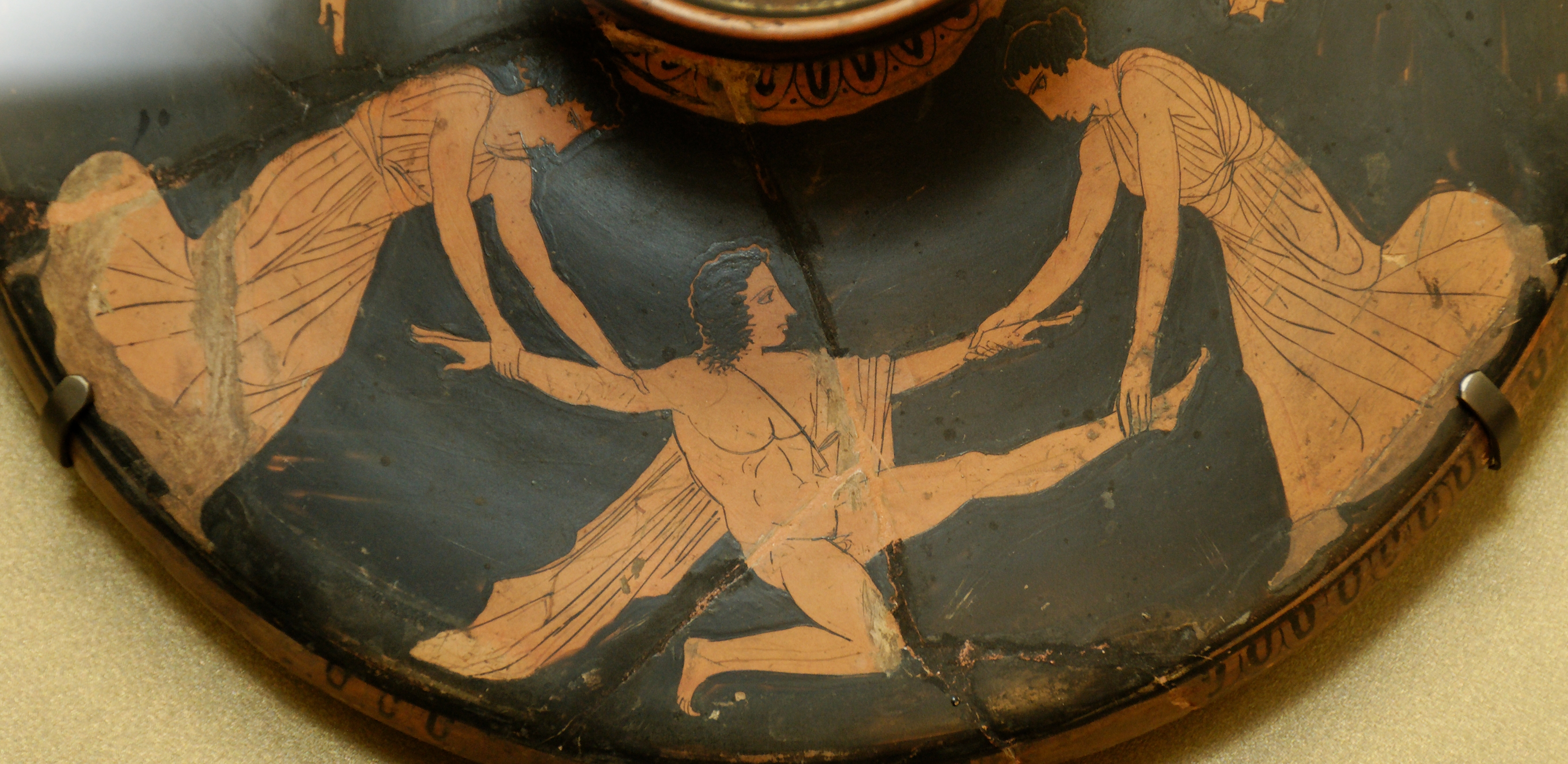
Pentheus torn apart by Ino and Agave, lekanis lid, ca. 450 BC, Louvre.

Dionysus lured Pentheus, disguised as a woman, out to spy on the Bacchic rites, where Pentheus expected to see sexual activities. The daughters of Cadmus saw him in a tree and thought him to be a wild animal. They pulled Pentheus down and tore him limb from limb (as part of a ritual known as the sparagmos). When his true identity was later discovered, officials exiled the women from Thebes. Some say that his own mother was the first to attack him, tearing his arm off and then tearing off his head. She placed the head on a stick and took it back to Thebes, but only realized whose head it was after meeting her father Cadmus.

The name "Pentheus", as Dionysus and Tiresias both point out, means "Man of Sorrows" and derives from πένθος, pénthos, sorrow or grief, especially the grief caused by the death of a loved one. His name appeared to mark him for tragedy. Pentheus was succeeded by his uncle Polydorus.

Before or possibly after Pentheus was killed, his wife gave birth to a son named Oclasus, who became the father of Menoeceus, who became the father of Creon and Jocasta. He became the great-great-grandfather of Oedipus.

The story of Pentheus is also discussed by Ovid in Book III of his Metamorphoses. Ovid's version diverges from Euripides' work in several areas. In Ovid's Metamorphoses, King Pentheus is warned by the blind seer Tiresias to welcome Bacchus or else "Your blood [shall be] poured out and defile the woods and your mother and her sisters..." Pentheus dismisses Tiresias and ignores his warnings. As Thebes succumbs to the "dementia and the delirium of the new god", Pentheus laments the fall of his kingdom and demands the arrest of Bacchus. His guards instead arrest Acoetes of Maeonia, a sailor who confirms the divinity of Bacchus and tells how the crew of his ship ended up being turned into dolphins after trying to kidnap the young god.

Pentheus, convinced that Acoetes is lying, tries to throw him in jail, but when the guards try to shackle Acoetes, the chains fall off. In a rage, Pentheus ran to deal with Bacchus himself. He charged through the woods straight into a Bacchanalia. Driven to a frenzy the participants thought Pentheus was a boar and attacked him. His mother was the first one to spear him and then the group tore his flesh apart with their bare hands.

In Oppian's version, Dionysus's female followers ask the god to transform them into leopards, and he grants their request, while simultaneously changing Pentheus into a bull. The leopards then attack and tear apart the bull, killing Pentheus, as Oppian presents the metaphors and illusions from The Bacchae as literal.

== In classical history ==
According to a biography written by the ancient historian Plutarch, after his defeat and death at the Battle of Carrhae in 53 BC, the head of Roman general and statesman Marcus Licinius Crassus was sent to the Parthian emperor Orodes II and used "as a prop, standing in for the head of" Pentheus in a production of Euripides' The Bacchae.

== In modern popular culture ==
King Pentheus appears in Bacchae, a classical Meitei language play based on the ancient Greek tragedy of the same title. In the play, as distinct from the original tragedy, King Pentheus is portrayed as a small community, whose chances of survival are highly unpredictable and doubtful, affected by the massive globalization results of the developed countries (depicted by the god Dionysus).

== Family tree of Theban Royal House ==
Royal House of Thebes
- Solid lines indicate descendants.
- Dashed lines indicate marriages.
- Dotted lines indicate extra-marital relationships or adoptions.
- Kings of Thebes are numbered with bold names and a light purple background.
  - Joint rules are indicated by a number and lowercase letter, for example, 5a. Amphion shared the throne with 5b. Zethus.
- Regents of Thebes are alphanumbered (format AN) with bold names and a light red background.
  - The number N refers to the regency preceding the reign of the N^{th} king. Generally this means the regent served the N^{th} king but not always, as Creon (A9) was serving as regent to Laodamas (the 10th King) when he was slain by Lycus II (the usurping 9th king).
  - The letter A refers to the regency sequence. "A" is the first regent, "B" is the second, etc.
- Deities have a yellow background color.

Harmonia	1. Cadmus	Polyxo	A4. Nycteus (Regent)	Dirce	B4 & A6. Lycus (Regent)
Zeus	Zeus
Ino	Agave	Echion	3. Polydorus	Nycteis	Antiope
Semele	Autonoë
Dionysus	2. Pentheus	Epeiros	4. Labdacus	5a. Amphion	5b. Zethus
Oclasus
Menoeceus
Eurydice	A7, A8 & A9. Creon (Regent)	Jocasta	6. Laius	Merope	Polybus
Hipponome	Alcaeus
Zeus
Alcmene	Amphitryon	Perimede	7. Oedipus
Megara	Heracles	Iphicles	Anaxo
Henioche	Megareus	Haemon	Antigone	8b. Eteocles	Argea	8a. Polynices
Pyrrha	Lycomedes	Ismene	9. Lycus II
A12. Peneleos (Regent)	10. Laodamas	Demonassa	11. Thersander
Opheltes	12. Tisamenus
14. Damasichthon	13. Autesion
15. Ptolemy	Theras	Argeia	Aristodemus
16. Xanthos	Eurysthenes	Procles

Regnal titles
Preceded by Cadmus	Mythical King of Thebes	Succeeded by Polydorus
