= Lycus (son of Hyrieus) =

Greek mythological Theban king

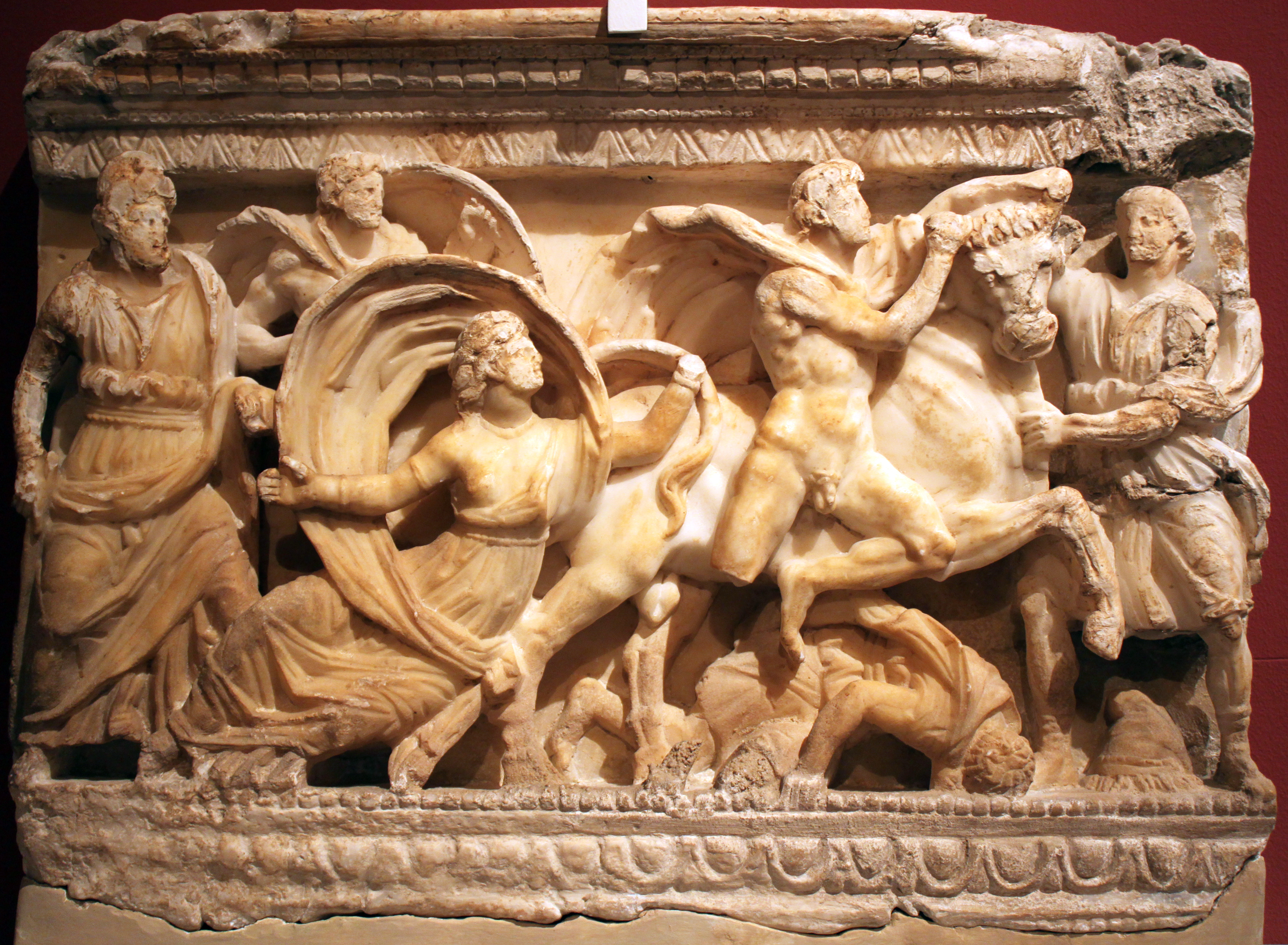
Lycus (far left) attempting to save Dirce from Amphion and Zethus in an Etruscan funerary urn, c. 120-110 BC, Altes Museum.

In Greek mythology, Lycus or Lykos (/ˈlaɪkəs/ LY-kəs; Ancient Greek: Λύκος, romanized: Lúkos, lit. 'wolf') was a ruler of the ancient city of Thebes, Greece. His rule was preceded by the regency of Nycteus and in turn, Lycus was succeeded by the twins Amphion and Zethus.

== Family ==
Lycus and his brother Nycteus were the sons of either (1) Chthonius, one of the Spartoi; or (2) of the nymph Clonia and Hyrieus, the son of Poseidon and the Atlantid Alkyone; or lastly (3) of Poseidon and the Pleiad Celaeno. He was married to Dirce and possibly by her, the father of another Lycus. Lycus was the uncle of Antiope, daughter of Nycteus.

== Mythology ==
Lycus and Nycteus fled from Euboea after they murdered King Phlegyas, settling in Hyria and then moving to Thebes, because they were friends with Pentheus, its king.

Pentheus's successor was Polydorus, who married Nycteis, the daughter of Nycteus. Nycteus served as regent for Labdacus, the son of Polydorus, when Polydorus died at a young age. Nycteus's daughter, Antiope, was impregnated by Zeus, and fled to Sicyon to marry King Epopeus.

Pausanias writes that Nycteus waged war on Epopeus, but in battle was wounded, and died after being carried back to Thebes, appointing Lycus as regent for Labdacus. Nycteus urged Lycus to continue to attack Epopeus, and to retake and punish Antiope. Epopeus died of a wound just as Nycteus did, and his heir Lamedon gave Antiope up freely to avoid war.

The author of the Bibliotheca, however, writes that Lycus was the one chosen regent after the deaths of Pentheus and Labdacus. Nycteus killed himself from shame when he discovered Antiope's pregnancy, and Lycus initiated the attack because he himself desired to punish her, successfully carrying her off after the battle.

In either case, Antiope gave birth to the twins Amphion and Zethus on the way back to Thebes, at Mount Cithaeron. Lycus abandoned the babies, leaving them with shepherds.

Once he returned to Thebes, Lycus gained custody of his niece Antiope. She was given over by Lycus to Dirce who took her away, locked her up and tortured her cruelly. After many years, Antiope escaped and found her sons who vowed to reap revenge for what Lycus and Dirce did to their mother for all those years. Eventually, they returned to Thebes to kill Lycus and Dirce and take command of the city. According to Euripides, Hermes forbade the twins from killing Lycus, although he forced Lycus to give them Thebes.

Regnal titles
Preceded by Nycteus	Regent of Thebes (first regency)	Succeeded by Labdacus
Preceded by Labdacus	King of Thebes (second regency)	Succeeded by Amphion and Zethus

== Theban royal family tree ==
Royal House of Thebes
- Solid lines indicate descendants.
- Dashed lines indicate marriages.
- Dotted lines indicate extra-marital relationships or adoptions.
- Kings of Thebes are numbered with bold names and a light purple background.
  - Joint rules are indicated by a number and lowercase letter, for example, 5a. Amphion shared the throne with 5b. Zethus.
- Regents of Thebes are alphanumbered (format AN) with bold names and a light red background.
  - The number N refers to the regency preceding the reign of the N^{th} king. Generally this means the regent served the N^{th} king but not always, as Creon (A9) was serving as regent to Laodamas (the 10th King) when he was slain by Lycus II (the usurping 9th king).
  - The letter A refers to the regency sequence. "A" is the first regent, "B" is the second, etc.
- Deities have a yellow background color.

Harmonia	1. Cadmus	Polyxo	A4. Nycteus (Regent)	Dirce	B4 & A6. Lycus (Regent)
Zeus	Zeus
Ino	Agave	Echion	3. Polydorus	Nycteis	Antiope
Semele	Autonoë
Dionysus	2. Pentheus	Epeiros	4. Labdacus	5a. Amphion	5b. Zethus
Oclasus
Menoeceus
Eurydice	A7, A8 & A9. Creon (Regent)	Jocasta	6. Laius	Merope	Polybus
Hipponome	Alcaeus
Zeus
Alcmene	Amphitryon	Perimede	7. Oedipus
Megara	Heracles	Iphicles	Anaxo
Henioche	Megareus	Haemon	Antigone	8b. Eteocles	Argea	8a. Polynices
Pyrrha	Lycomedes	Ismene	9. Lycus II
A12. Peneleos (Regent)	10. Laodamas	Demonassa	11. Thersander
Opheltes	12. Tisamenus
14. Damasichthon	13. Autesion
15. Ptolemy	Theras	Argeia	Aristodemus
16. Xanthos	Eurysthenes	Procles
