= Oedipus =

Mythical Greek king of Thebes

- King of Thebes
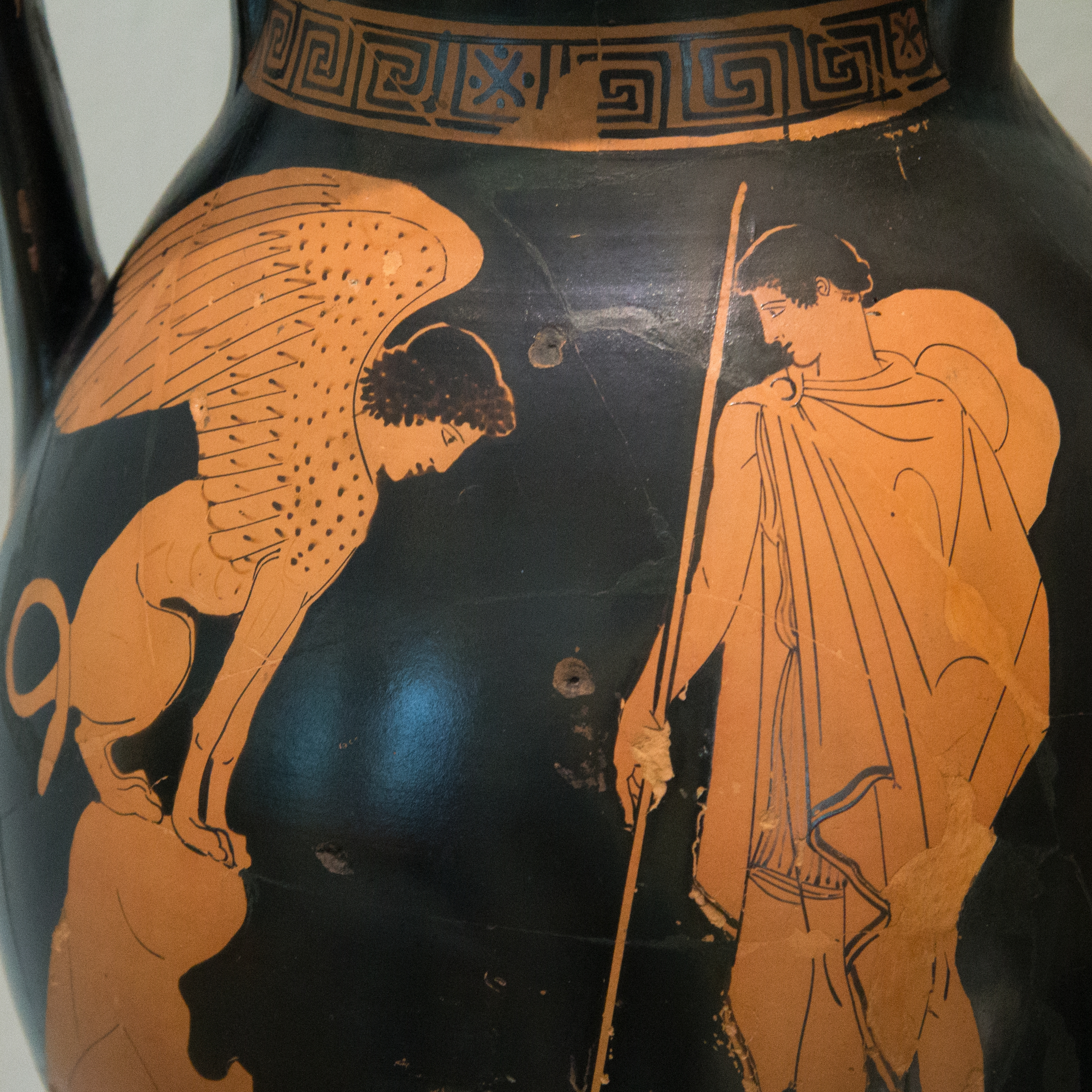
- Oedipus and Sphinx, pelike, 450–440 BC
- Predecessor: Laius
- Successor: Eteocles
- Region: Thebes

Genealogy
- Parents: Laius and Jocasta (biological); Polybus and Merope (adoptive)
- Siblings: Alcinoë (adoptive)
- Consort: Jocasta, Euryganeia, Astymedusa
- Offspring: Antigone, Ismene, Eteocles, Polynices

Oedipus (UK: /ˈiːdɪpəs/, also US: /ˈɛdɪ-/; Ancient Greek: Οἰδίπους Oidípous, lit. 'swollen foot') was a mythical Greek king of Thebes. A tragic hero in Greek mythology, Oedipus unwittingly fulfilled a prophecy that he would end up killing his father and marrying his mother, thereby bringing disaster to his city and family. The story of Oedipus is the subject of Sophocles's tragedy Oedipus Rex, which is followed in the narrative sequence by Oedipus at Colonus and then Antigone. Together, these plays make up Sophocles's three Theban plays. Oedipus represents two enduring themes of Greek myth and drama: the flawed nature of humanity and an individual's role in the course of destiny in a harsh universe.

In the best-known version of the myth, Oedipus was born to King Laius and Queen Jocasta of Thebes. As the son of Laius, he bore the patronymic "Laiades." Before Oedipus’s birth, Laius had received a prophecy that his son would one day kill him and marry his mother. Laius wished to thwart the prophecy, so he sent a shepherd-servant to leave Oedipus to die on a mountainside. However, the shepherd took pity on the baby and passed him to another shepherd who gave Oedipus to King Polybus and Queen Merope to raise as their own.

Oedipus learned from the oracle at Delphi of the prophecy that he would end up killing his father and marrying his mother but, unaware of his true parentage, believed he was fated to murder Polybus and marry Merope, and so he left for Thebes. On his way, he met an older man, who was (unbeknownst to him) his father, and killed him in a quarrel. Continuing on to Thebes, he found that the king of the city (Laius) had recently been killed and that the city was at the mercy of the Sphinx. Oedipus answered the monster's riddle correctly, defeating it and winning the throne of the dead king – and the hand in marriage of the king's widow, who was also (unbeknownst to him) his mother Jocasta.

Years later, to end a plague on Thebes, Oedipus searched to find who had killed Laius and discovered that he himself was responsible. Jocasta, upon realizing that she had married her own son, hanged herself. Oedipus then seized two pins from her dress and blinded himself with them. The legend of Oedipus has been retold in many versions and was used by Sigmund Freud to name and give mythic precedent to the Oedipus complex.

== Basics of the myth ==
A man named Euphorbus carries the infant Oedipus, Attic red-figure neck amphora c. 450-445 BC, BnF

Variations on the legend of Oedipus are mentioned in fragments by several ancient Greek poets including Homer, Hesiod, Pindar, Aeschylus, and Euripides. However, the most popular version of the legend comes from the set of Theban plays by Sophocles: Oedipus Rex, Oedipus at Colonus, and Antigone.

Oedipus was the son of Laius and Jocasta, king and queen of Thebes. Having been childless for some time, Laius consulted the Oracle of Apollo at Delphi. The Oracle prophesied that any son born to Laius would kill him. In an attempt to prevent this prophecy's fulfillment, when Jocasta indeed bore a son, Laius had his son's ankles pierced and tethered together so that he could not crawl; Jocasta then gave the boy to a servant to abandon ("expose") on the nearby mountain. However, rather than leave the child to die of exposure, as Laius intended, the servant passed the baby on to a shepherd from Corinth, who then gave the child to another shepherd.

The infant Oedipus was eventually adopted by Polybus and Merope, the king and queen of Corinth, as they were without children of their own. Little Oedipus was named after the swelling from the injuries to his feet and ankles ("swollen foot"). After many years, Oedipus was told by a drunk that he was a "bastard", which meant that he was an illegitimate child. Oedipus confronted his foster parents with the news, but they denied this. Oedipus then went to the same oracle in Delphi that his birth parents had consulted. The oracle informed him that he was destined to murder his father and marry his mother. In an attempt to avoid such a fate, he decided not to return home to Corinth, but to travel to Thebes, which was closer to Delphi.

On the way, Oedipus came to Daulia, where three roads crossed. There he encountered a chariot driven by his birth-father, King Laius. They fought over who had the right to go first and Oedipus killed Laius when the charioteer tried to run him over. The only witness of the king's death was a slave who fled from a caravan of slaves which was also travelling on the road at the time.

Continuing his journey to Thebes, Oedipus encountered a Sphinx, who would stop all travellers to Thebes and ask them a riddle. If the travelers were unable to answer her correctly, they would be killed and eaten; if they were successful, they would be free to continue on their journey. The riddle was "What walks on four feet in the morning, two in the afternoon, and three at night?" and Oedipus answered: "Man: as an infant, he crawls on all fours; as an adult, he walks on two legs and; in old age, he uses a 'walking' stick." Oedipus was the first to answer the riddle correctly; the Sphinx would then commit suicide out of embarrassment (in some versions however, Oedipus kills her).

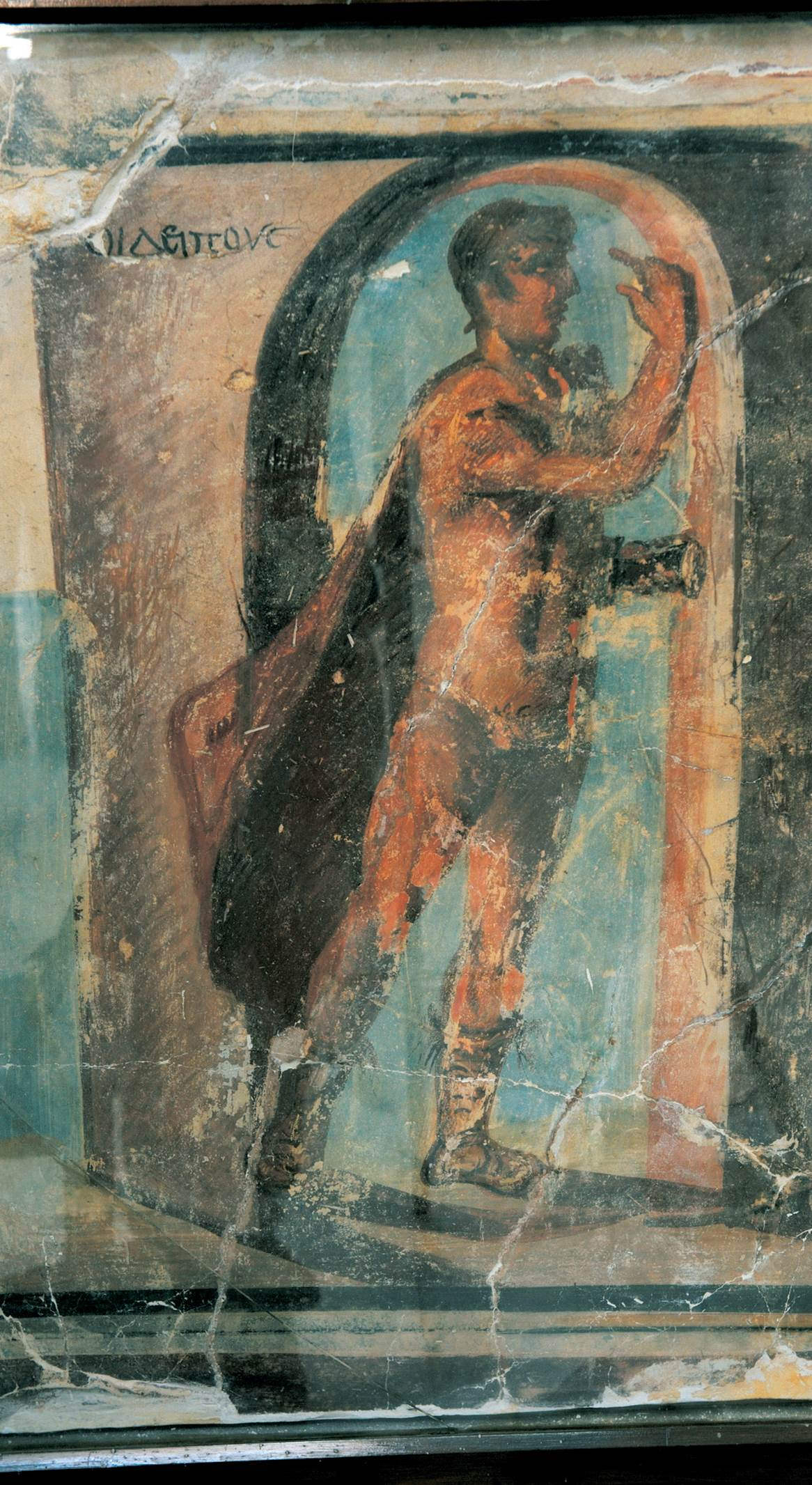
Detail of ancient fresco in which Oedipus solves the riddle of the Sphinx. Egyptian Museum, c. 2nd CE

Queen Jocasta's brother, Creon, had announced that any man who could rid the city of the Sphinx would be made king of Thebes and given the recently widowed Queen's hand in marriage. This marriage of Oedipus to Jocasta fulfilled the rest of the prophecy. Four children would be born out of the incestuous marriage: sons Eteocles and Polynices (whose fates are detailed in Seven Against Thebes) and daughters Antigone and Ismene.

Many years later, a plague of infertility struck the city of Thebes, affecting all living beings. Oedipus asserted that he would end the pestilence. He sent Creon to the Oracle at Delphi, seeking guidance. When Creon returned, Oedipus learned that the murderer of King Laius must be brought to justice, and Oedipus himself cursed the killer of his wife's late husband, saying that he would be exiled. Creon also suggested that they attempt to find the blind prophet Tiresias, who was widely respected. Oedipus sent for Tiresias, who warned him not to seek Laius's killer. In a heated exchange, Tiresias was provoked into exposing Oedipus as the killer, and the fact that Oedipus was living in shame because he did not know who his true parents were. Oedipus angrily blamed Creon for the false accusations, and the two argued. Jocasta entered and tried to calm Oedipus by telling him the story of her first-born son and his supposed death. Oedipus became nervous as he realized that he may have murdered Laius and so brought about the plague. Suddenly, a messenger arrived from Corinth with the news that King Polybus had died. Oedipus was relieved, for the prophecy could no longer be fulfilled if Polybus, whom he believed to be his birth father, was now dead.

Still, he knew that his mother was still alive and refused to attend the funeral at Corinth. To ease the tension, the messenger then said that Oedipus was, in fact, adopted. Jocasta, finally realizing that he was her son, begged him to stop his search for Laius's murderer. Oedipus misunderstood her motivation, thinking that she was ashamed of him because he might have been born of low birth. Jocasta, in great distress, went into the palace, where she hanged herself. Oedipus sought verification of the messenger's story from the very same herdsman who was supposed to have left Oedipus to die as a baby. From the herdsman, Oedipus learned that the infant who was raised as the adopted son of Polybus and Merope, was the actual son of Laius and Jocasta. Thus, Oedipus finally realized that the man he had killed so many years before was his father and that he had married his mother.

Events after the revelation depend on the source. In Sophocles's plays, Oedipus went in search of Jocasta and found she had killed herself. Using the pin from a brooch he took off Jocasta's gown, Oedipus blinded himself and was then exiled. His daughter Antigone acted as his guide as he wandered through the country, finally dying at Colonus where they had been welcomed by King Theseus of Athens. However, in Euripides's plays on the subject, Jocasta did not kill herself upon learning of Oedipus's birth, and Oedipus was blinded by a servant of Laius. The blinding of Oedipus does not appear in sources earlier than Aeschylus. Some older sources of the myth, including Homer, state that Oedipus continued to rule Thebes after the revelations and Jocasta's death.

Oedipus's two sons, Eteocles and Polynices, arranged to share the kingdom, each taking an alternating one-year reign. However, Eteocles refused to cede his throne after his year as king. Polynices brought in an army to oust Eteocles from his position and a battle ensued. At the end of the battle, the brothers killed each other, after which Jocasta's brother, Creon, took the throne. He decided that Polynices was a "traitor", and should not be given burial rites. Antigone attempted to bury her brother in defiance of the edict. In Sophocles's Antigone, Creon had her buried in a rock cavern for defying him, whereupon she hanged herself. However, in Euripides's lost version of the story, it appears that Antigone survives the imposed exile.

== Ancient sources ==
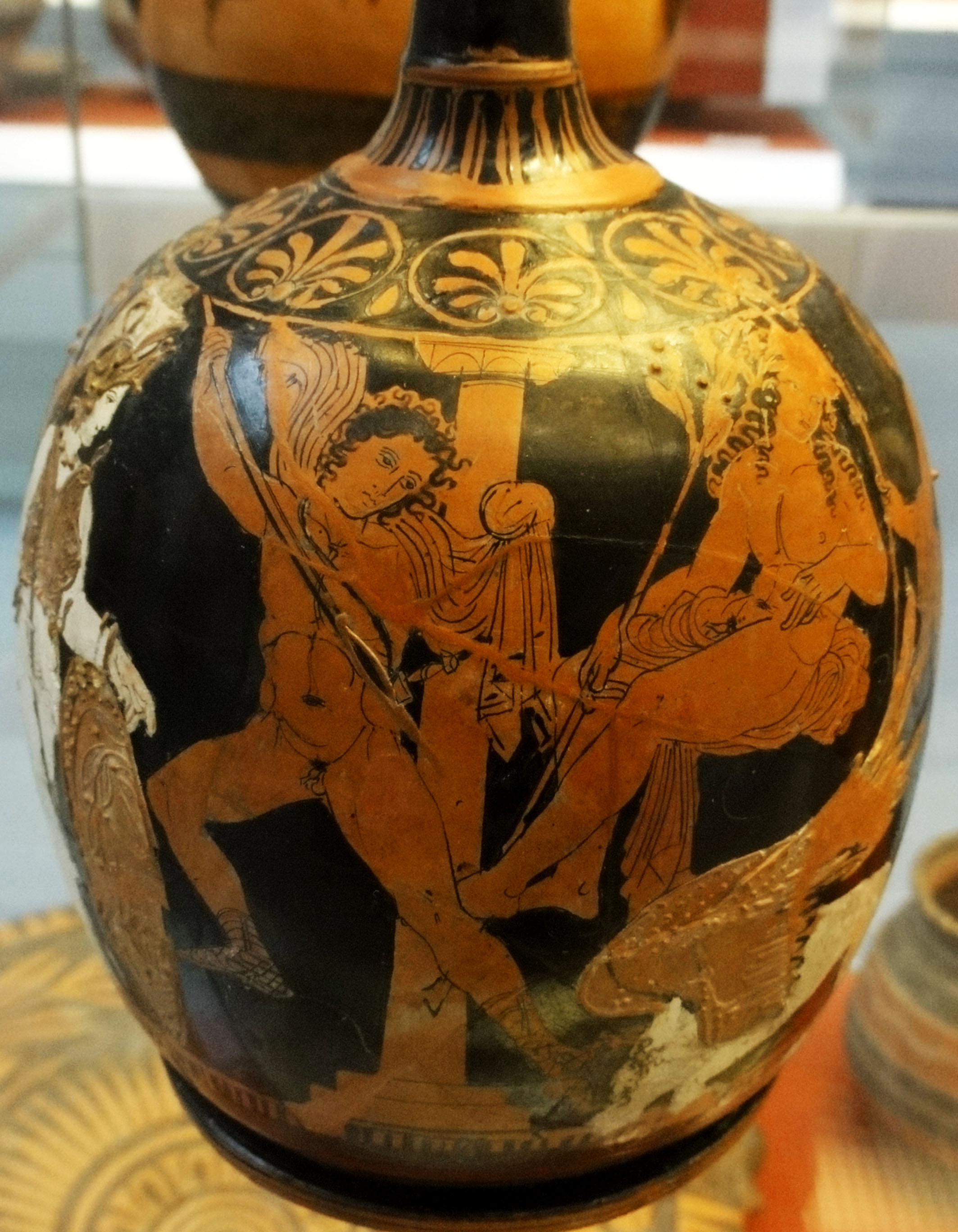
Oedipus slaying the sphinx, on an Attic lekythos, c. 420–400 BC, housed in the British Museum

Oedipus's legend was first transmitted orally, with Homer being the earliest individual credited for relaying it. Written mention of Oedipus begins in the 5th century BC. According to later source, Oedipus died fighting in a cattle raid against Argos whilst king of Thebes. Though these stories principally deal with his downfall, various details still appear on how Oedipus rose to power.

King Laius of Thebes hears of a prophecy that his infant son will one day kill him. He pierces Oedipus's feet and leaves him out to die, but a shepherd finds him and carries him away. Years later, Oedipus, not knowing he was adopted, leaves home in fear of the same prophecy that he will kill his father and marry his mother. Laius journeys out to seek a solution to the Sphinx's mysterious riddle or to hear news of his son. As prophesied, Oedipus and Laius cross paths, but they do not recognize each other. A fight ensues, and Oedipus kills Laius and most of his guards. Oedipus goes on to defeat the Sphinx by solving a riddle to become king. He marries the widowed Queen Jocasta, unaware that she is his mother. A plague falls on the people of Thebes. Upon discovering the truth, Oedipus blinds himself, and Jocasta hangs herself. After Oedipus is no longer king, Oedipus's brother-sons kill each other.

Some differences with older stories emerge. The curse of Oedipus's sons was elaborated on retroactively to include Oedipus and his father, Laius. Oedipus now steps down from the throne instead of dying in battle. Additionally, rather than his children being by a second wife, Oedipus's children are now by Jocasta (hence, they are his brothers as well).

=== Odysseus in the Underworld ===
In the Odyssey, Odysseus meets Oedipus' mother in the Underworld, recalling:

And I saw the mother of Oedipus, fair Epicaste,
who wrought a monstrous deed in ignorance of mind,
in that she wedded her own son, and he, when he had slain his own father,
wedded her, and straightway the gods made these things known among men.
But he, for all his sorrows, in beloved Thebe
kept on ruling over the Cadmeans, through the baneful counsels of the gods,
but she went down to the house of Hades, the strong warder.
She made fast a noose on high from a lofty beam,
overpowered by her sorrow, but for him she left behind woes
manifold, as great as a mother's Furies will bring about.

In contrast to Sophocles' account, there is no mention yet of Oedipus in exile, nor mention of an extensive investigation for the murderer of Laius and the circumstances of Oedipus' birth solved by mortals; rather, the gods reveal the truth "immediately" (ἄφαρ).

=== Pindar's second Olympian Ode ===
In his second Olympian Ode (476 BC), Pindar writes:

Laius' tragic son, crossing his father's path, killed him and fulfilled the oracle spoken of old at Pytho. And sharp-eyed Erinys saw and slew his warlike children at each other's hands. Yet Thersandros survived fallen Polyneikes and won the honor in youthful contests and the brunt of war, a scion of aid to the house of Adrastos.

— Lines 35-40.

=== Aeschylus's Seven Against Thebes trilogy (467 BC) ===
In 467 BC, the Athenian playwright, Aeschylus, most notably wrote a trilogy based on the myth of Oedipus, winning him the first prize at the City Dionysia. Of the plays, Laius was the first, Oedipus was second, and Seven Against Thebes was the third play and the only one to have survived.

In Seven Against Thebes, Oedipus's sons Eteocles and Polynices kill each other warring over the throne. Much like his Oresteia, the trilogy would have detailed the tribulations of a House over three successive generations. The satyr play that followed the trilogy was called The Sphinx.

=== Sophocles's Theban plays ===
The three surviving works of Sophocles's "Theban plays" consist of: Oedipus Rex (also called Oedipus Tyrannus or Oedipus the King), Oedipus at Colonus, and Antigone. All three plays concern the fate of the City of Thebes, during and after the reign of King Oedipus, and have often been published under a single cover. Originally, Sophocles had written the plays for three separate festival competitions, many years apart. Not only are the Theban plays not a true trilogy (three plays presented as a continuous narrative), they are not even an intentional series and contain some inconsistencies among them. Sophocles also wrote other plays focused on Thebes, most notably the Epigoni, of which only fragments have survived.

==== Oedipus Rex ====
As Sophocles's Oedipus Rex begins, the people of Thebes are begging the king for help, begging him to discover the cause of the plague. Oedipus stands before them and swears to find the root of their suffering and to end it. Just then, Creon returns to Thebes from a visit to the oracle. Apollo has made it known that Thebes is harboring a terrible abomination and that the plague will only be lifted when the true murderer of old King Laius is discovered and punished for his crime. Oedipus swears to do this, not realizing that he is himself the culprit. The stark truth emerges slowly over the course of the play, as Oedipus clashes with the blind seer Tiresias, who senses the truth. Oedipus remains in strict denial, though, becoming convinced that Tiresias is somehow plotting with Creon to usurp the throne.

Realization begins to slowly dawn in Scene II of the play when Jocasta mentions out of hand that Laius was slain at a place where three roads meet. This stirs something in Oedipus's memory and he suddenly remembers the men he fought and killed one day long ago at a place where three roads met. He realizes, horrified, that he might be the man he's seeking. One household servant survived the attack and now lives out his old age in a frontier district of Thebes. Oedipus sends immediately for the man to either confirm or deny his guilt. At the very worst, though, he expects to find himself to be the unsuspecting murderer of a man unknown to him. The truth has not yet been made clear.

The moment of epiphany comes late in the play. At the beginning of Scene III, Oedipus is still waiting for the servant to be brought into the city, when a messenger arrives from Corinth to declare that King Polybus of Corinth is dead. Oedipus, when he hears this news, feels much relieved, because he believed that Polybus was the father whom the oracle had destined him to murder, and he momentarily believes himself to have escaped fate. He tells this all to the present company, including the messenger, but the messenger knows that it is not true. He is the man who found Oedipus as a baby in the pass of Cithaeron and gave him to King Polybus to raise. He reveals, furthermore that the servant who is being brought to the city as they speak is the very same man who took Oedipus up into the mountains as a baby. Jocasta realizes now all that has happened. She begs Oedipus not to pursue the matter further. He refuses, and she withdraws into the palace as the servant is arriving. The old man arrives, and it is clear at once that he knows everything. At the behest of Oedipus, he tells it all.

Overwhelmed with the knowledge of all his crimes, Oedipus rushes into the palace where he finds his mother-wife, dead by her own hand. Ripping a brooch from her dress, Oedipus blinds himself with it. Bleeding from the eyes, he begs his uncle and brother-in-law Creon, who has just arrived on the scene, to exile him forever from Thebes. Creon agrees to this request. Oedipus begs to hold his two daughters Antigone and Ismene with his hands one more time to have their eyes full of tears and Creon out of pity sends the girls in to see Oedipus one more time.

==== Oedipus at Colonus ====
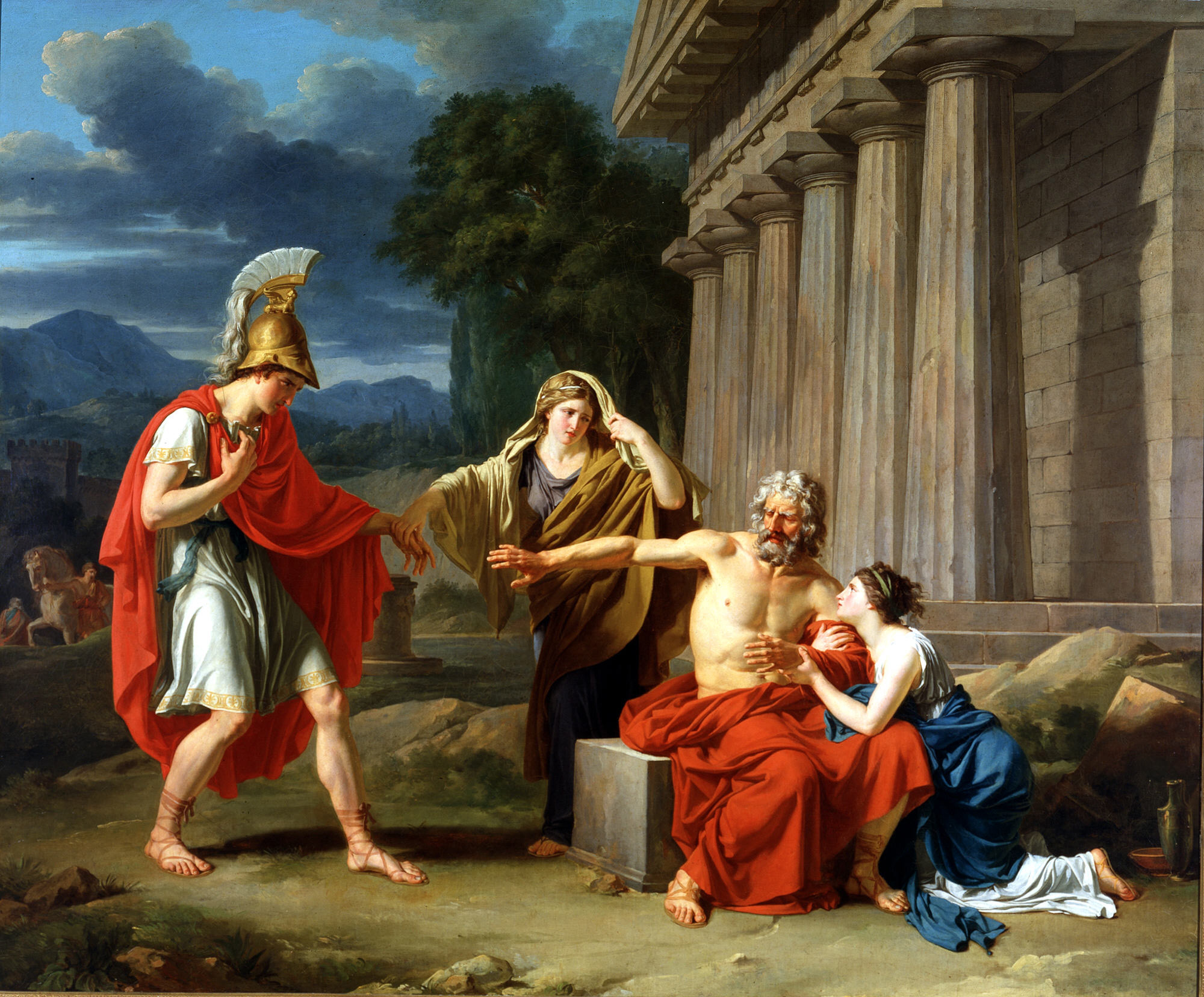
Oedipus at Colonus

In Sophocles's Oedipus at Colonus, Oedipus becomes a wanderer, pursued by Creon and his men. He finally finds refuge in the holy wilderness right outside Athens, where it is said that Theseus took care of Oedipus and his daughter, Antigone. Creon eventually catches up to Oedipus. He asks Oedipus to come back from Colonus to bless his son, Eteocles. Angry that his son did not love him enough to take care of him, he curses both Eteocles and his brother, condemning them both to kill each other in battle. Oedipus dies a peaceful death; his grave is said to be sacred to the gods.

==== Antigone ====
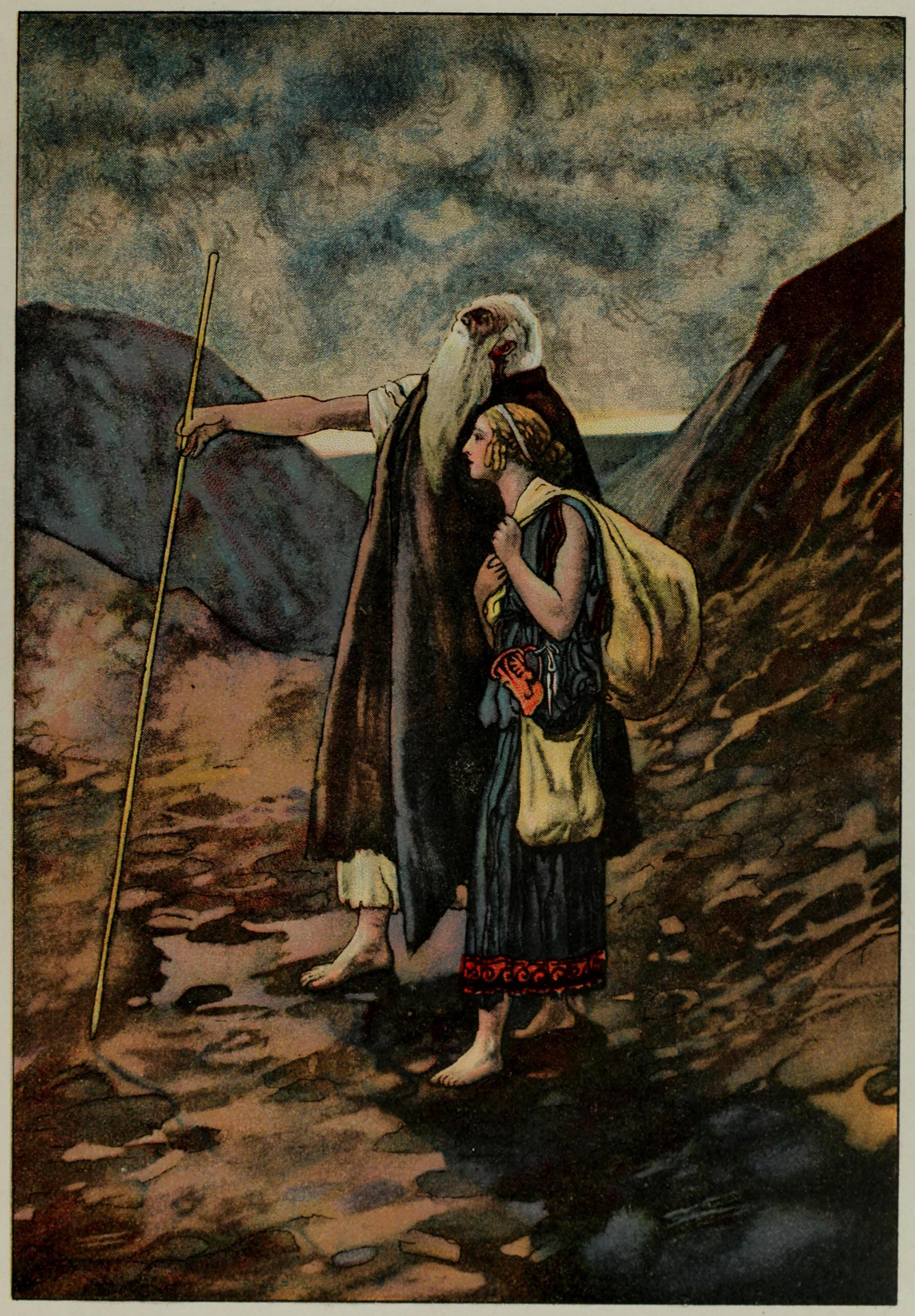
The blind Oedipus led by his daughter Antigone

In Sophocles's Antigone, when Oedipus stepped down as king of Thebes, he gave the kingdom to his two sons, Eteocles and Polynices, both of whom agreed to alternate the throne every year. However, they showed no concern for their father, who cursed them for their negligence. After the first year, Eteocles refused to step down and Polynices attacked Thebes with his supporters (as portrayed in the Seven Against Thebes by Aeschylus and the Phoenician Women by Euripides). The two brothers killed each other in battle. King Creon, who ascended to the throne of Thebes, decreed that Polynices was not to be buried. Antigone, Polynices's sister, defied the order but was caught.

Creon decreed that she was to be put into a stone box in the ground, this in spite of her betrothal to his son Haemon. Antigone's sister, Ismene, then declared she had aided Antigone and wanted the same fate, but Creon eventually declined to execute her. The gods, through the blind prophet Tiresias, expressed their disapproval of Creon's decision, which convinced him to rescind his order, and he went to bury Polynices himself. However, Antigone had already hanged herself in her tomb, rather than suffering the slow death of being buried alive. When Creon arrived at the tomb where she had been interred, his son Haemon attacked him upon seeing the body of his deceased fiancée but failing to kill Creon he killed himself. When Creon's wife, Eurydice, was informed of the death of Haemon, she too took her own life.

=== Euripides's Phoenissae, Chrysippus, and Oedipus ===
At the beginning of Euripides's Phoenissae, Jocasta recalls the story of Oedipus. Generally, the play weaves together the plots of the Seven Against Thebes and Antigone. The play differs from the other tales in two major respects. First, it describes in detail why Laius and Oedipus had a feud: Laius ordered Oedipus out of the road so his chariot could pass, but proud Oedipus refused to move. Second, in the play Jocasta has not killed herself at the discovery of her incest – otherwise, she could not play the prologue, for fathomable reasons – nor has Oedipus fled into exile, but they have stayed in Thebes only to delay their doom until the fatal duel of their sons/brothers/nephews Eteocles and Polynices: Jocasta commits suicide over the two men's dead bodies, and Antigone follows Oedipus into exile.

In Chrysippus, Euripides develops backstory on the curse: Laius's sin was to have kidnapped Chrysippus, Pelops's son, in order to violate him, and this caused the gods' revenge on all his family. Laius was the tutor of Chrysippus, and raping his student was a severe violation of his position as both guest and tutor in the house of the royal family hosting him at the time. Extant vases show a fury hovering over the lecherous Laius as he abducts the rape victim. Furies avenged violations of good order in households, as can be seen most clearly in such texts as The Libation Bearers by Aeschylus.

Euripides wrote also an Oedipus, of which only a few fragments survive. The first line of the prologue recalled Laius's hubristic action of conceiving a son against Apollo's command. At some point in the action of the play, a character engaged in a lengthy and detailed description of the Sphinx and her riddle – preserved in five fragments from Oxyrhynchus, P.Oxy. 2459 (published by Eric Gardner Turner in 1962). The tragedy also featured many moral maxims on the theme of marriage, preserved in the Anthologion of Stobaeus. The most striking lines, however, state that in this play Oedipus was blinded by Laius's attendants and that this happened before his identity as Laius's son had been discovered, therefore marking important differences with the Sophoclean treatment of the myth, which is now regarded as the 'standard' version. Many attempts have been made to reconstruct the plot of the play, but none of them is more than hypothetical, because of the scanty remains that survive from its text and of the total absence of ancient descriptions or résumés – though it has been suggested that a part of Hyginus's narration of the Oedipus myth might in fact derive from Euripides's play. Some echoes of the Euripidean Oedipus have been traced also in a scene of Seneca's Oedipus in which Oedipus himself describes to Jocasta his adventure with the Sphinx.

=== Other playwrights ===
At least three other 5th-century BC authors who were younger than Sophocles wrote plays about Oedipus. These include Achaeus of Eretria, Nichomachus and the elder Xenocles.

== Later additions ==
The Bibliotheca, a Roman-era mythological handbook, includes a riddle for the Sphinx, borrowing the poetry of Hesiod: "What is that which has one voice and yet becomes four-footed and two-footed and three-footed?"

=== Later addition to Aeschylus's Seven against Thebes ===
Due to the popularity of Sophocles's Antigone (c. 442 BC), the ending (lines 1005–78) of Seven against Thebes was added some fifty years after Aeschylus's death. Whereas the play (and the trilogy of which it is the last play) was meant to end with somber mourning for the dead brothers, the spurious ending features a herald announcing the prohibition against burying Polynices, and Antigone's declaration that she will defy that edict.

== Post-Classical literature ==
Oedipus was a figure who was also used in the Latin literature of ancient Rome. Julius Caesar wrote a play on Oedipus, but it has not survived into modern times. Ovid included Oedipus in Metamorphoses, but only as the person who defeated the Sphinx. He makes no mention of Oedipus's troubled experiences with his father and mother. Seneca the Younger wrote his own play on the story of Oedipus in the first century AD. It differs in significant ways from the work of Sophocles.

Some scholars have argued that Seneca's play on the myth was intended to be recited at private gatherings and not actually performed. It has been successfully staged since the Renaissance. It was adapted by John Dryden in his very successful heroic drama Oedipus, licensed in 1678. The 1718 Oedipus was also the first play written by Voltaire. A version of Oedipus by Frank McGuinness was performed at the National Theatre in late 2008, starring Ralph Fiennes and Claire Higgins.

In the late 1960s Ola Rotimi published a novel and play, The Gods Are Not to Blame, which retells the Oedipus myth happening in the Yoruba kingdom. In 2011, U.S. writer David Guterson published his Oedipus-inspired novel Ed King. In folkloristics, the myth of Oedipus is classified in the international Aarne-Thompson-Uther Index as tale type ATU 931, "Oedipus".

== Family tree ==
Royal House of Thebes
- Solid lines indicate descendants.
- Dashed lines indicate marriages.
- Dotted lines indicate extra-marital relationships or adoptions.
- Kings of Thebes are numbered with bold names and a light purple background.
  - Joint rules are indicated by a number and lowercase letter, for example, 5a. Amphion shared the throne with 5b. Zethus.
- Regents of Thebes are alphanumbered (format AN) with bold names and a light red background.
  - The number N refers to the regency preceding the reign of the N^{th} king. Generally this means the regent served the N^{th} king but not always, as Creon (A9) was serving as regent to Laodamas (the 10th King) when he was slain by Lycus II (the usurping 9th king).
  - The letter A refers to the regency sequence. "A" is the first regent, "B" is the second, etc.
- Deities have a yellow background color.

Harmonia	1. Cadmus	Polyxo	A4. Nycteus (Regent)	Dirce	B4 & A6. Lycus (Regent)
Zeus	Zeus
Ino	Agave	Echion	3. Polydorus	Nycteis	Antiope
Semele	Autonoë
Dionysus	2. Pentheus	Epeiros	4. Labdacus	5a. Amphion	5b. Zethus
Oclasus
Menoeceus
Eurydice	A7, A8 & A9. Creon (Regent)	Jocasta	6. Laius	Merope	Polybus
Hipponome	Alcaeus
Zeus
Alcmene	Amphitryon	Perimede	7. Oedipus
Megara	Heracles	Iphicles	Anaxo
Henioche	Megareus	Haemon	Antigone	8b. Eteocles	Argea	8a. Polynices
Pyrrha	Lycomedes	Ismene	9. Lycus II
A12. Peneleos (Regent)	10. Laodamas	Demonassa	11. Thersander
Opheltes	12. Tisamenus
14. Damasichthon	13. Autesion
15. Ptolemy	Theras	Argeia	Aristodemus
16. Xanthos	Eurysthenes	Procles

== Oedipus complex ==
Sigmund Freud used the name "the Oedipus complex" to explain the origin of certain neuroses in childhood. It is defined as a male child's unconscious desire for the exclusive love of his mother. This desire includes jealousy towards the father and the unconscious wish for that parent's death, as well as the unconscious desire for sexual intercourse with the mother. Oedipus himself, as portrayed in the myth, did not have this neurosis – at least, not towards Jocasta, whom he only met as an adult (if anything, such feelings would have been directed at Merope – but there is no hint of that). Freud reasoned that the ancient Greek audience, which heard the story told or saw the plays based on it, did know that Oedipus was actually killing his father and marrying his mother; the story being continually told and played therefore reflected a preoccupation with the theme.

== See also ==
- Epigoni
- Genetic attraction
- Myrrha (the Greek myth of incestual love between father and daughter)
- Lille Stesichorus

== Notes ==
Regnal titles
Preceded by Laius	Mythical King of Thebes	Succeeded by Creon
