= Laius =

Greek mythological king of Thebes

- King of Thebes
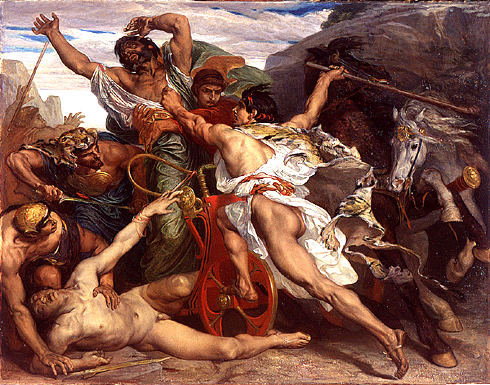
- The Murder of Laius by Oedipus, by Joseph Blanc
- Predecessor: Labdacus
- Successor: Oedipus
- Region: Thebes

Genealogy
- Parents: Labdacus (father)
- Spouse: Jocasta
- Children: Oedipus

In Greek mythology, King Laius (/ˈleɪəs, ˈlaɪəs/ L(A)Y-əs) or Laios (Ancient Greek: Λάϊος, romanized: Láïos) of Thebes was a key personage in the Theban founding myth. Son of King Labdacus, Laius fathered Oedipus with Jocasta and was later killed by Oedipus, although Oedipus did not know Laius was his father at the time.

== Mythology ==
=== Abduction of Chrysippus ===
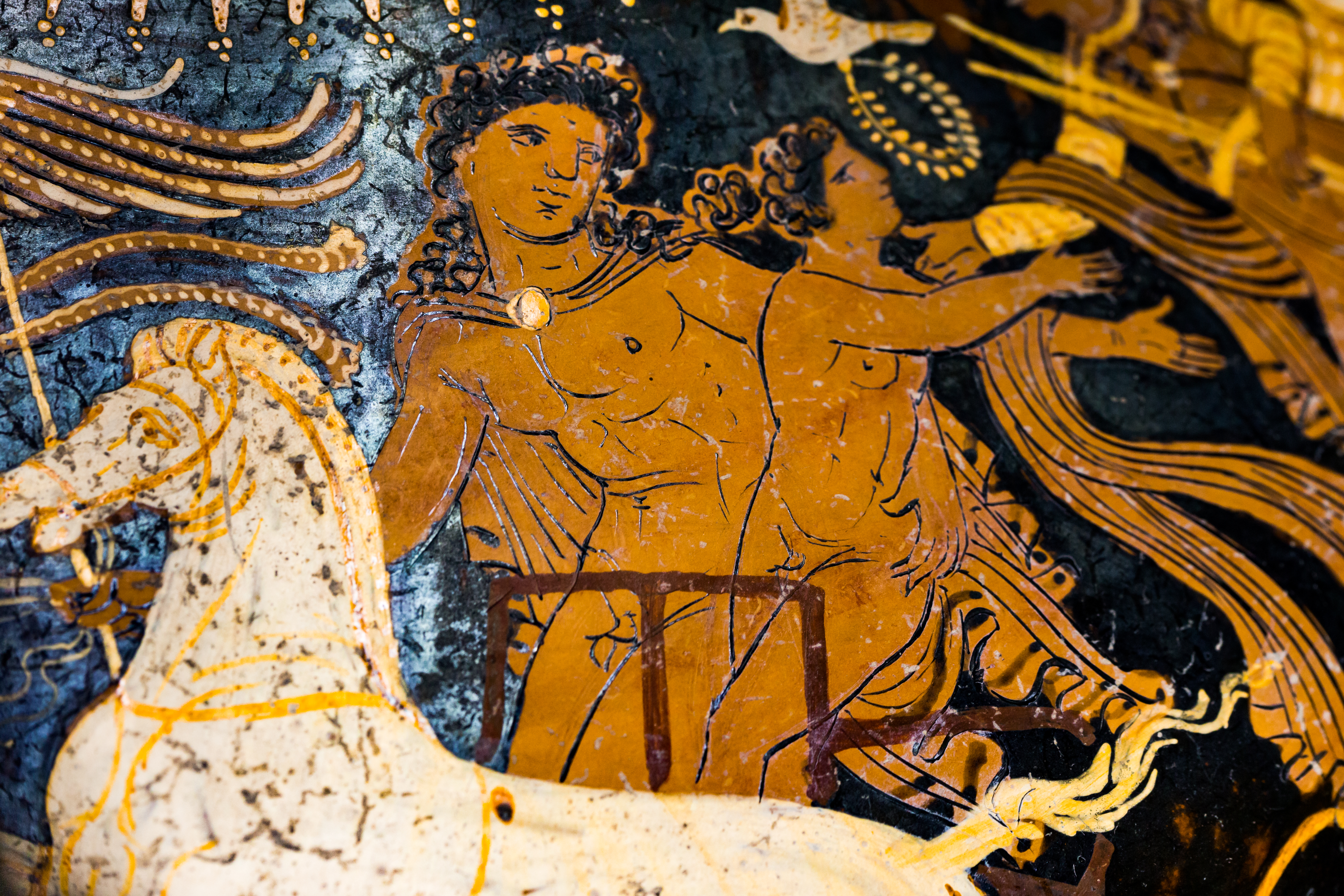
The abduction of Chrysippus by Laius on an Apulian red-figure hydria, c. 320-310 BC, Archaeological Museum of Fiesole.

After the death of his father Labdacus, Laius was raised by the regent Lycus but Amphion and Zethus usurped the throne of Thebes. Some Thebans, wishing to see the line of Cadmus continue, smuggled the young Laius out of the city before their attack, in which they killed Lycus and took the throne. However in Apollodorus' Bibliotheca Laius was banished by Amphion and Zethus after their attack. Laius was welcomed by Pelops, king of Pisa in the Peloponnesus. According to some sources, Laius abducted and raped the king's son, Chrysippus, and carried him off to Thebes while teaching him how to drive a chariot, or as Hyginus records it, during the Nemean Games. Because of this, Laius is considered by many to be the originator of pederastic love, and the first pederastic rapist.

This abduction is thought to be the subject of one of the lost tragedies of Euripides. With both Amphion and Zethus having died in his absence, Laius became king of Thebes upon his return.

=== Later misfortunes ===
After the rape of Chrysippus, Laius married Jocasta, the daughter of Menoeceus, a descendant of the Spartoi. Laius received an oracle from Delphi which told him that he must not have a child, or the child would kill him and marry his wife; in another version, recorded by Aeschylus, Laius is warned that he can save the city only if he dies childless. One night, however, Laius was drunk and fathered Oedipus with Jocasta. On Laius' orders, the baby, Oedipus, was exposed on Mount Cithaeron with his feet bound (or perhaps staked to the ground), but he was taken by a shepherd, who did not have the resources to look after him, so he was given to King Polybus and Queen Merope (or Periboea) of Corinth, who raised him to adulthood.

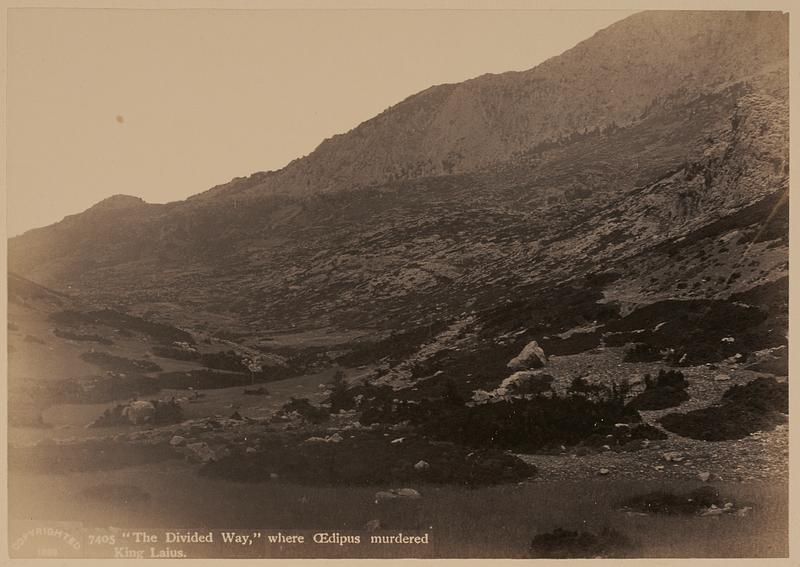
"The Divided Way," where Oedipus murdered King Laius, ca. 1889. Nicholas Catsimpoolas Collection, Boston Public Library

When Oedipus desired to know more about his parentage, he consulted the Delphic Oracle, only to be told that he must not go to his home or he would kill his father and marry his mother. Thinking that he was from Corinth, he set out toward Thebes to avoid this fate. At the road called 'Cleft Way,' he met Laius, who was going to Delphi to consult the oracle because he had received omens indicating that his son might return to kill him. Oedipus refused to defer to the king, although Laius' attendants ordered him to. Being angered, Laius either rolled a chariot wheel over his foot or hit him with his whip, and Oedipus killed Laius and all but one of his attendants, who claimed (causing much subsequent confusion) that it had been a gang of men. Laius was buried where he died by Damasistratus, the king of Plataea. Later, Thebes was cursed with a disease because Laius' murderer had not been punished.

Many of Laius' descendants met with ill fortune, but whether this was because he violated the laws of hospitality and marriage by carrying off his host's son and raping him, or because he ignored the Oracle's warning not to have children, or some combination of these, is not clear. Another theory is that the entire line of Cadmus was cursed, either by Ares when Cadmus killed his serpent, or else by Hephaestus who resented the fact that Cadmus married Harmonia, the daughter of Ares and Aphrodite, Hephaestus' straying wife. Certainly, many of Cadmus' descendants had tragic ends.

== Family ==
Laius was the son of Labdacus. He was the father, by Jocasta, of Oedipus, who killed him.

Royal House of Thebes
- Solid lines indicate descendants.
- Dashed lines indicate marriages.
- Dotted lines indicate extra-marital relationships or adoptions.
- Kings of Thebes are numbered with bold names and a light purple background.
  - Joint rules are indicated by a number and lowercase letter, for example, 5a. Amphion shared the throne with 5b. Zethus.
- Regents of Thebes are alphanumbered (format AN) with bold names and a light red background.
  - The number N refers to the regency preceding the reign of the N^{th} king. Generally this means the regent served the N^{th} king but not always, as Creon (A9) was serving as regent to Laodamas (the 10th King) when he was slain by Lycus II (the usurping 9th king).
  - The letter A refers to the regency sequence. "A" is the first regent, "B" is the second, etc.
- Deities have a yellow background color.

Harmonia	1. Cadmus	Polyxo	A4. Nycteus (Regent)	Dirce	B4 & A6. Lycus (Regent)
Zeus	Zeus
Ino	Agave	Echion	3. Polydorus	Nycteis	Antiope
Semele	Autonoë
Dionysus	2. Pentheus	Epeiros	4. Labdacus	5a. Amphion	5b. Zethus
Oclasus
Menoeceus
Eurydice	A7, A8 & A9. Creon (Regent)	Jocasta	6. Laius	Merope	Polybus
Hipponome	Alcaeus
Zeus
Alcmene	Amphitryon	Perimede	7. Oedipus
Megara	Heracles	Iphicles	Anaxo
Henioche	Megareus	Haemon	Antigone	8b. Eteocles	Argea	8a. Polynices
Pyrrha	Lycomedes	Ismene	9. Lycus II
A12. Peneleos (Regent)	10. Laodamas	Demonassa	11. Thersander
Opheltes	12. Tisamenus
14. Damasichthon	13. Autesion
15. Ptolemy	Theras	Argeia	Aristodemus
16. Xanthos	Eurysthenes	Procles

Regnal titles
Preceded by Amphion and Zethus	Mythical King of Thebes	Succeeded by Oedipus

== See also ==
- Laius complex
