= Polynices =

Mythological prince of Thebes

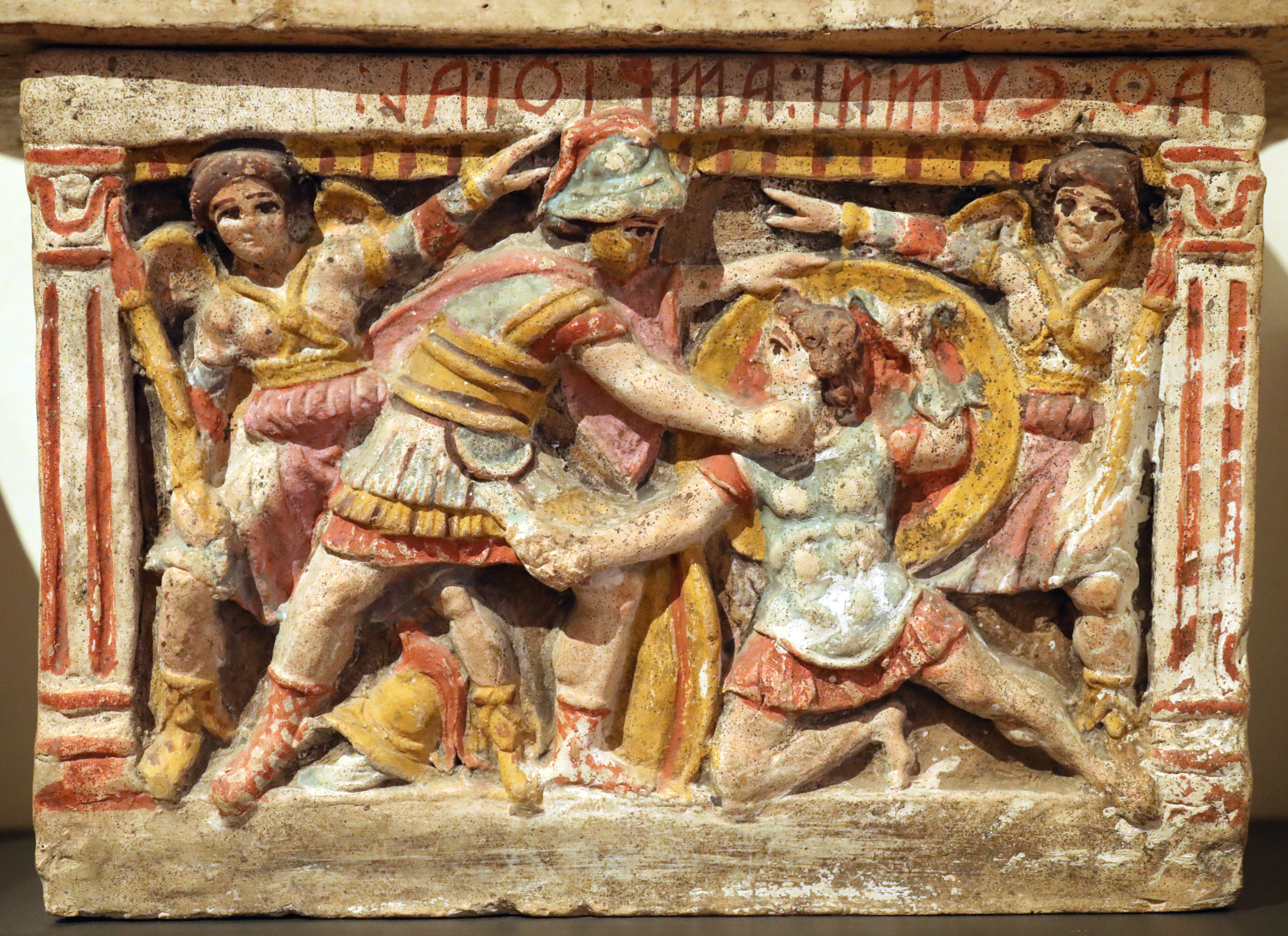
Etruscan funerary urn with the deaths of Eteocles and Polynices in polychrome terracotta, 3rd century BC from the tomb of the Cumni in Santa Mustiola.

In Greek mythology, Polynices (also Polyneices) (/ˌpɒlɪˈnaɪsiːz/; Ancient Greek: Πολυνείκης, romanized: Polyneíkes, lit. 'manifold strife' or 'much strife') was the son of Oedipus and either Jocasta or Euryganeia, and the brother of Eteocles, Antigone, and Ismene. When Oedipus discovered that he had killed his father and married his mother, he blinded himself and left Thebes, leaving Polynices and Eteocles to rule jointly. However, due to a curse placed upon them by Oedipus, their agreement quickly fell apart, and a war for the kingdom ensued. During battle, the brothers killed each other.

Polynices is a central character in the Theban Cycle, a set of stories famous in ancient Greece. He is most well-known from three 5th century BC tragic plays by Sophocles known as the Three Theban Plays: Oedipus Rex, Oedipus at Colonus, and Antigone, with his death and burial being the main driver of the plot of Antigone. He also features prominently in the Thebaid, Aeschylus' play Seven Against Thebes, and Statius' Thebaid. The story and his character was also of interest to ancient Greek philosophers, and was discussed by Aristotle, Plato, and Epictetus.

== Family ==
Polynices is named as a son of Oedipus, king of Thebes and son of Laius, and Queen Jocasta, sister of Creon. Some authors have alternately named Euryganeia, daughter of Hyperphas, as the mother of Polynices and his siblings. Ancient Greek geographer Pausanias claimed that this difference in parentage is sourced from the Oedipodia, a poem in the Theban Cycle that is now lost. Through Jocasta's father Menoeceus, Polynices was a descendant of Cadmus, the legendary founder of Thebes whose descendants often suffered great misfortune. (Note: The misfortune of Cadmus' line has been attributed to his slaying of Ares' sacred dragon and the Necklace of Harmonia, a cursed necklace that was gifted to his wife.)

Polynices had three full siblings: one younger brother, Eteocles, and two sisters, Ismene and Antigone. Oedipus was both his father and his brother, as he had unknowingly married his own mother, Jocasta. Polynices married Argia, a daughter of King Adrastus of Argos and his wife Amphithea. Together they had three sons: Adrastus, Thersander, and Timeas.

== Mythology ==
=== Oedipus's curse ===
In the Thebaid, the brothers were cursed by their father for their disrespect towards him on two occasions. The first of these occurred when they served him using the silver table of Cadmus and a golden cup, which he had forbidden. The brothers then sent him the haunch of a sacrificed animal, rather than the shoulder, which he deserved. Enraged, Oedipus prayed to Zeus that the brothers would die by each other's hand. However, in Sophocles' Oedipus at Colonus, Oedipus desired to stay in Thebes but was expelled by Creon. His sons argued over the throne, but Eteocles gained the support of the Thebans and expelled Polynices, who went to Oedipus to ask for his blessing to retake the city, but instead was cursed to die by his brother's hand. His son was Thersander.

=== Quarrel over the rule of Thebes ===
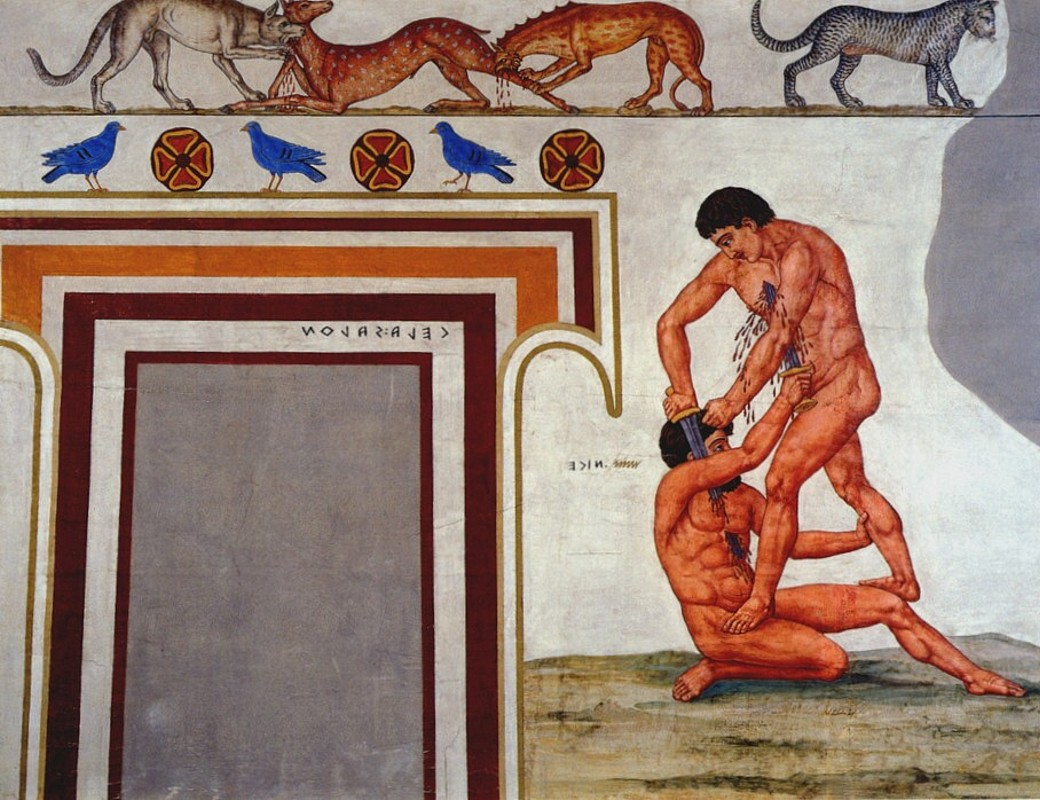
Eteocles and Polynices, copy of mural in François Tomb from Vulci made in 4th century BC

There are several accounts of how Eteocles and Polynices shared the rule after Oedipus' departure from the city. In Hellanicus' account, Eteocles offers his brother his choice of either the rule of the city or a share of the property. In Pherekydes, however, Eteocles expels Polynices by force, and keeps the rule of Thebes and the inheritance. The Bibliotheca and Diodorus state that the brothers agree to divide the kingship between them, switching each year. Eteocles, however, was allotted the first year, and refused to surrender the crown.

Eteocles then has his brother exiled, though Polynices soon finds refuge in the city of Argos. There he is welcomed by the king, Adrastus who gives him his daughter, Argia, for his wife. Polynices then pleads his case to King Adrastus, requesting his help to restore him to the throne of Thebes. Adrastos promises to do so and to that end sets out to gather an expeditionary force to march against Thebes. He appoints seven individual champions to lead this assault, one for each of the seven gates in the walls of the city. Together, these champions, including Adrastus and Polynices, are known as the “Seven against Thebes”. The expedition soon proved to be complete disaster, as all of the Argive champions (save for Adrastus) were slain in the ensuing battle; Polynices and Eteocles face off against one another in single combat and kill each other.

Ten years after Polynices' death, the sons of the seven fallen champions gathered to launch a second assault against the city of Thebes to avenge the deaths of their fathers; they are the known as the Epigoni. Unlike their fathers before them, these Epigoni are successful in their attempt to take Thebes, after which they install Thersander, Polynices' son by Argia, as the city's new ruler.

=== Burial ===
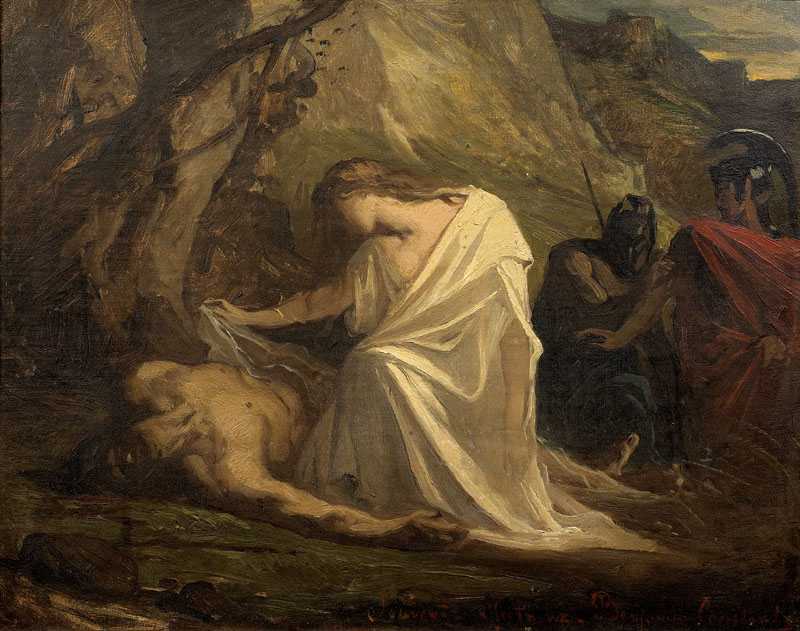
Antigone on the side of Polynices by Jean-Joseph Benjamin-Constant, 1868.

In Sophocles' tragedy Antigone, Polynices' story continues after his death. King Creon, who ascended to the throne of Thebes, decreed that Polynices was not to be buried or even mourned, on pain of death by stoning. Antigone, his sister, defied the order, but was caught. Creon decreed death, this in spite of her betrothal to his son Haemon. Antigone's sister, Ismene, then declared she had aided Antigone and wanted the same fate. Creon imprisoned Antigone in a sepulchre; meanwhile the gods, through the blind prophet Tiresias, expressed their disapproval of Creon's decision, which convinced him to rescind his order. He then went to bury Polynices himself, and release Antigone. However, she had already hanged herself rather than be buried alive. When Creon arrived at the tomb where she was to be interred, his son Haemon made as if to attack him and then killed himself. When Creon's wife, Eurydice, was informed of their deaths, she took her own life.

== Genealogy ==
Royal house of Thebes family tree
- Solid lines indicate descendants.
- Dashed lines indicate marriages.
- Dotted lines indicate extra-marital relationships or adoptions.
- Kings of Thebes are numbered with bold names and a light purple background.
  - Joint rules are indicated by a number and lowercase letter, for example, 5a. Amphion shared the throne with 5b. Zethus.
- Regents of Thebes are alphanumbered (format AN) with bold names and a light red background.
  - The number N refers to the regency preceding the reign of the N^{th} king. Generally this means the regent served the N^{th} king but not always, as Creon (A9) was serving as regent to Laodamas (the 10th King) when he was slain by Lycus II (the usurping 9th king).
  - The letter A refers to the regency sequence. "A" is the first regent, "B" is the second, etc.
- Deities have a yellow background color.

Harmonia	1. Cadmus	Polyxo	A4. Nycteus (Regent)	Dirce	B4 & A6. Lycus (Regent)
Zeus	Zeus
Ino	Agave	Echion	3. Polydorus	Nycteis	Antiope
Semele	Autonoë
Dionysus	2. Pentheus	Epeiros	4. Labdacus	5a. Amphion	5b. Zethus
Menoeceus
Eurydice	A7, A8 & A9. Creon (Regent)	Jocasta	6. Laius	Merope	Polybus
Hipponome	Alcaeus
Zeus
Alcmene	Amphitryon	Perimede	7. Oedipus
Megara	Heracles	Iphicles	Anaxo
Henioche	Megareus	Haemon	Antigone	8b. Eteocles	Argea	8a. Polynices
Pyrrha	Lycomedes	Ismene	9. Lycus II
A12. Peneleos (Regent)	10. Laodamas	Demonassa	11. Thersander
Opheltes	12. Tisamenus
14. Damasichthon	13. Autesion
15. Ptolemy	Theras	Argeia	Aristodemus
16. Xanthos	Eurysthenes	Procles

== See also ==
- Epigoni
- The Thebans
