= Autesion =

Mythological Greek king

In Greek mythology, Autesion (Ancient Greek: Αὐτεσίων; gen.: Αὐτεσίωνος), was a king of Thebes. He was the son of Tisamenus, the grandson of Thersander and Demonassa and the great-grandson of Polynices and Argea.

Autesion is called the father of Theras and Argeia, by the latter of whom Aristodemus became the father of Eurysthenes and Procles. Autesion was a native of Thebes, where he had succeeded his father as king, but at the command of an oracle he went to Peloponnesus and joined the Dorians.

Autesion was also the name of a warrior who was killed by Corymbasos (Κορύμβασος), who was a chief of the Indians, in the epic poem Dionysiaca.

== Genealogy ==
Royal house of Thebes family tree
- Solid lines indicate descendants.
- Dashed lines indicate marriages.
- Dotted lines indicate extra-marital relationships or adoptions.
- Kings of Thebes are numbered with bold names and a light purple background.
  - Joint rules are indicated by a number and lowercase letter, for example, 5a. Amphion shared the throne with 5b. Zethus.
- Regents of Thebes are alphanumbered (format AN) with bold names and a light red background.
  - The number N refers to the regency preceding the reign of the N^{th} king. Generally this means the regent served the N^{th} king but not always, as Creon (A9) was serving as regent to Laodamas (the 10th King) when he was slain by Lycus II (the usurping 9th king).
  - The letter A refers to the regency sequence. "A" is the first regent, "B" is the second, etc.
- Deities have a yellow background color.

Harmonia	1. Cadmus	Polyxo	A4. Nycteus (Regent)	Dirce	B4 & A6. Lycus (Regent)
Zeus	Zeus
Ino	Agave	Echion	3. Polydorus	Nycteis	Antiope
Semele	Autonoë
Dionysus	2. Pentheus	Epeiros	4. Labdacus	5a. Amphion	5b. Zethus
Menoeceus
Eurydice	A7, A8 & A9. Creon (Regent)	Jocasta	6. Laius	Merope	Polybus
Hipponome	Alcaeus
Zeus
Alcmene	Amphitryon	Perimede	7. Oedipus
Megara	Heracles	Iphicles	Anaxo
Henioche	Megareus	Haemon	Antigone	8b. Eteocles	Argea	8a. Polynices
Pyrrha	Lycomedes	Ismene	9. Lycus II
A12. Peneleos (Regent)	10. Laodamas	Demonassa	11. Thersander
Opheltes	12. Tisamenus
14. Damasichthon	13. Autesion
15. Ptolemy	Theras	Argeia	Aristodemus
16. Xanthos	Eurysthenes	Procles

== Notes ==
Regnal titles
Preceded by Tisamenus	Mythical King of Thebes	Succeeded by Damasichthon
