= Queen of Thebes =

Queen of Thebes can refer to:

- Nycteïs, wife of Polydorus
- Jocasta, wife/mother of Oedipus
- Ino (Greek mythology), daughter of Cadmus
- Niobe, wife of Amphion
- Retrea, mother of Orion (mythology)

== See also ==
- Theban kings in Greek mythology
