= Nycteïs =

In Greek mythology, Nycteis (Ancient Greek: Νυκτηίς, lit. 'daughter of night' or 'nocturnal') was the daughter of Nycteus and Polyxo. She married the son of Cadmus and Harmonia, Polydorus, a Theban king and mother by him of Labdacus, king of Thebes.
