= Pyracmus (king of Euboea) =

King of Paeonia

In Greek mythology, Pyracmus was a king of Euboea during the Heroic Age. After waging war against Boeotia, he was slain by Heracles.

== Bibliography ==
- John Bell, Bell's New Pantheon; or, Historical Dictionary of the Gods, Demi-Gods, Heroes, and Fabulous Personages of Antiquity, J. Bell, London (1790).
