= Thersander (Epigoni) =

Greek mythology figure

In Greek mythology, the name Thersander or Thersandros (/θɜːrˈsændər, -ˈsɑːn-/; Ancient Greek: Θέρσανδρος means 'bold man' derived from θέρσος thersos 'boldness, braveness' and ἀνδρός andros 'of a man') was one of the Epigoni, who attacked the city of Thebes. This is in retaliation for the deaths of their fathers, the war of the Seven against Thebes, who had attempted the same thing.

== Family ==
Thersander was the son of Polynices and Argia. He was succeeded by his son Tisamenus, whose mother was Demonassa.

== Mythology ==
Thersander may have bribed Eriphyle with the robe of Harmonia so that she sent her son, Alcmaeon, to fight with him. His father did the same with the necklace of Harmonia, to convince her to send her husband with the original attackers. The attack of the Epigoni was successful, and Thersander became the king of Thebes. Thersander intended to fight for the Greeks during the Trojan War, but was killed by Telephus before the war began, while the Greeks had mistakenly stopped in Mysia. Pindar refers to Thersander as gaining honor after Polynices' death and preserving the house of Adrastus for later generations.

Regnal titles
Preceded by Laodamas	Mythical King of Thebes	Succeeded by Tisamenus
