= Ismene =

Mythological princess of Thebes

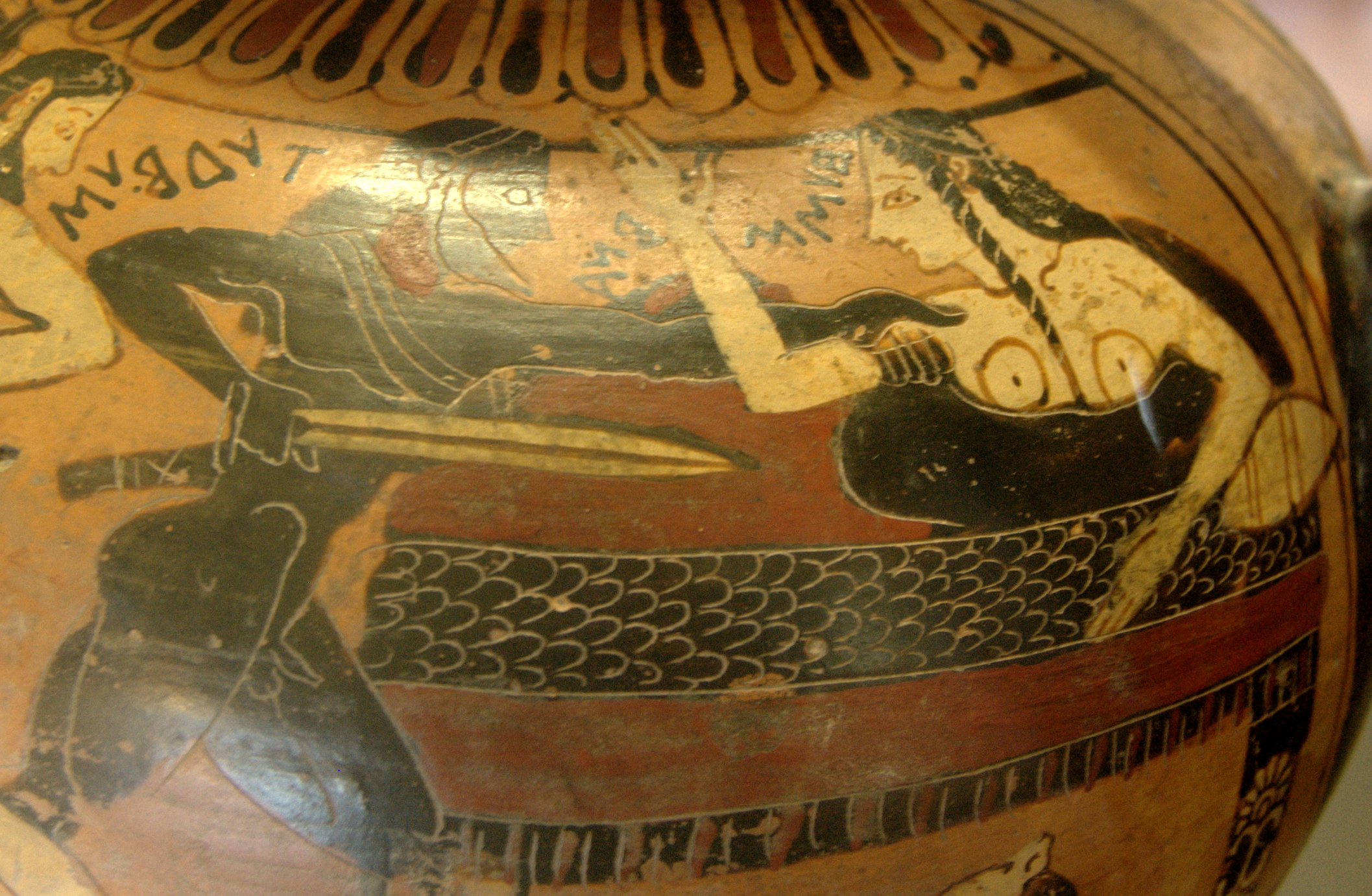
Tydeus and Ismene on a Corinthian black-figure amphora, ca. 560 BC, Louvre.

In Greek mythology, Ismene (/ɪzˈmiːniː/; Ancient Greek: Ἰσμήνη, romanized: Ismḗnē) was a Theban princess. She was the daughter and half-sister of Oedipus, king of Thebes, daughter and granddaughter of Jocasta, and sister of Antigone, Eteocles, and Polynices. She appears in several tragic plays of Sophocles, including Oedipus Rex, Oedipus at Colonus, and Antigone. She also appears at the end of Aeschylus' Seven Against Thebes.

== Family ==
Traditionally, Ismene was the daughter of Oedipus and Jocasta (or Epicaste), king and queen of Thebes. She had three full siblings: Antigone, Polynices, and Eteocles, and her father Oedipus was also her half-brother, being Jocasta's son.

In the lost Oedipodea, the archaic epic poem that narrated the adventures of Oedipus and inspired later authors, the children of Oedipus were mothered by Euryganeia, daughter of Hyperphas. In the Odyssey, Homer writes that, after Oedipus' incestuous marriage to his mother, the gods revealed the incest "straightaway." In reference to this, Pausanias claims that the notion that the gods revealed it straightaway is incompatible with the idea that Oedipus and Jocasta had four children, so his children must have been born to another woman.

That being said, there is no absolute confirmation that Ismene was a part of the Oedipodea at all, let alone as Oedipus' daughter. Ismene was likely a separate Theban heroine integrated into Oedipus' myth and family tree by the tragedians during the fifth century BC.

== Mythology ==
=== Early works ===
The seventh-century BC poet Mimnermus wrote that Ismene was murdered by Tydeus, one of the Seven who took arms against Thebes. In this account, Ismene was dallying with her lover Theoclymenus when Tydeus surprised them, having been told of their whereabouts by the goddess Athena. Tydeus then slew Ismene. It is not clear what Athena's motivation was; perhaps here Ismene was a priestess of Athena, so the goddess was punishing her dalliance. This tradition cannot be reconciled with the events depicted in later works by Aeschylus and Sophocles, in which Ismene appears alive after the battle is over and Tydeus is dead; it is also incompatible with Ismene's later timid and meek characterization.

This version of the story is mentioned in no other extant classical writing, but the scene is represented on a sixth-century BC Corinthian black-figure amphora now housed in the Louvre. The vase depicts Tydeus brandishing his sword at Ismene (spelled Hysmena), who is nude and reclining on a couch, while her lover (labelled "Periclymenus" here) flees and looks back, not at Ismene, but at Tydeus's sword. The scene probably takes place in a home or palace in Thebes. As Periclymenus is said to be the killer of Parthenopaeus, one of the Seven, the vase might depict a tradition in which Tydeus infiltrated Thebes, found Perclymenus and Ismene together in bed, and slew Ismene in revenge while her lover/husband managed to escape.

In another tradition by the early fifth-century poet Ion of Chios, Eteocles's son Laodamas burned Ismene alive together with Antigone inside Hera's temple.

=== In Greek tragedy ===
==== Aeschylus ====
Ismene is first identified as Oedipus and Jocasta's daughter by Aeschylus. His play Seven Against Thebes depicts the war and demise of Eteocles and Polynices. At the end of the play, the chorus narrates Ismene and Antigone entering to sing a funeral dirge together for both of their brothers. While Antigone exits with the first semichorus, escorting the body of Polynices, Ismene and the second semichorus exit with the body of Eteocles.

==== Sophocles ====
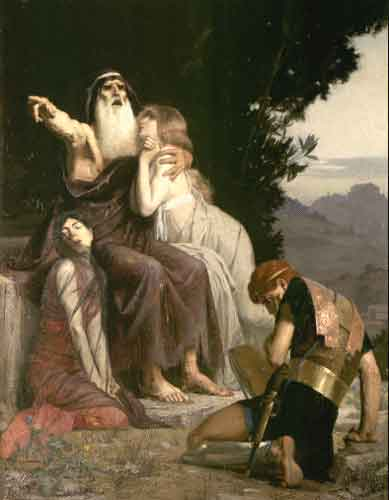
Oedipus (with Ismene and Antigone) condemns Polyneikes. Oil painting by Marcel Baschet (1883).

Ismene is not named in the first Theban play Oedipus Rex, but is seen at the end as her father/brother laments the "shame" and "sorrow" he is leaving her and her sister. Oedipus begs Creon to watch over them, but in his grief reaches to take them with him as he is led away. Creon prevents him from taking his daughters out of the city with him.

Ismene appears in Oedipus at Colonus to tell her father of the situation in Thebes and the rivalry of his sons. She explains that Eteocles has taken the throne from Polynices and driven him out of the city. As a result of this, Polynices gathered his own army to either take back the city "or to die there with honor." According to the Oracle of Delphi, the location where Oedipus is buried will determine the result of the war between the brothers. Ismene tells her father that Creon plans to have him buried on the border of Thebes so that they will have the desirable outcome. Hearing this, Oedipus curses his sons and refuses to leave Colonus. The chorus (in this play the elders of Colonus) tell him that because he has walked on the sacred ground of the Eumenides, he has to "perform rites of purification." Due to his blindness and age, Oedipus is unable to fulfill this task and asks one of his daughters to instead. Ismene agrees and exits to do so.

Later in the play, in an attempt to force Oedipus to return to Thebes, Creon tells him that he has seized Ismene and takes Antigone away as well. However, Theseus and the Athenians overpower them and exit to free the girls. Ismene appears again at the end of the play with her sister as they mourn the death of their father and lament that they cannot join him. Theseus tells them that Oedipus has been buried but the location is secret and he has forbidden that they be told of it. Antigone resolves to return to Thebes, and Ismene goes with her.

In the opening scene of the chronologically final play Antigone, the homonymous heroine tells Ismene of her plans to bury their brother Polynices, and asks her to join her. While Ismene laments the fate of Polynices' corpse, she refuses to defy the laws of the city and Creon. She advises her sister to be secretive if she is determined to take this course of action, and says she will do the same. Antigone, however, tells her not to keep silent but to tell everyone in the city. Ismene does not stop her sister, but makes her opinion of her foolishness clear.

Once Antigone is caught, in spite of her betrothal to his son Haemon, Creon decrees that she is to be buried alive. Ismene then declares that she has aided Antigone and wants to share her fate, though she did not participate in the crime. Antigone refuses to let her be martyred for a cause she did not stand up for, telling her to live. Antigone expresses that while Ismene's "choices seemed right to some--others agreed with [hers]," but Ismene tells her that the both of them were "equally wrong." Antigone is then buried alive.

== Genealogy ==
Cadmus	Pentheus
Polydorus	Oclasus
Labdacus	Menoeceus
Laius	Jocasta
Oedipus	Jocasta
Eteocles	Polynices	ISMENE	Antigone

== Bibliography ==
- Bell, Robert E. (1991). Women of Classical Mythology: A Biographical Dictionary. ABC-Clio. ISBN 9780874365818.
- Harder, Ruth Elisabeth (October 1, 2006). "Ismene". In Cancik, Hubert; Schneider, Helmuth (eds.). Brill's New Pauly. Translated by Christine F. Salazar. Zürich: Brill Reference Online. ISSN 1574-9347.
- Homer; The Odyssey with an English Translation by A.T. Murray, PH.D. in two volumes. Cambridge, MA., Harvard University Press; London, William Heinemann, Ltd. 1919. Online version at the Perseus Digital Library.
- Kaufmann, Walter (1992). Tragedy and Philosophy. Princeton, NJ: Princeton University Press. ISBN 0-691-02005-1.
- Pausanias, Description of Greece with an English Translation by W.H.S. Jones, Litt.D., and H.A. Ormerod, M.A., in 4 Volumes. Cambridge, MA, Harvard University Press; London, William Heinemann Ltd. 1918. ISBN 0-674-99328-4. Online version at the Perseus Digital Library
- Porter, James I. (1999). Constructions of the Classical Body. Michigan, US: University of Michigan Press. ISBN 0-472-10908-1.
- Pseudo-Apollodorus, The Library with an English Translation by Sir James George Frazer, F.B.A., F.R.S. in 2 Volumes, Cambridge, MA, Harvard University Press; London, William Heinemann Ltd. 1921. ISBN 0-674-99135-4. Online version at the Perseus Digital Library. Greek text available from the same website.
- Tyrtaeus, Solon, Theognis, Mimnermus. Greek Elegiac Poetry: From the Seventh to the Fifth Centuries BC. Edited and translated by Douglas E. Gerber. Loeb Classical Library 258. Cambridge, MA: Harvard University Press, 1999.
- West, M.L. (2003), Greek Epic Fragments, Loeb Classical Library no. 497, Cambridge, MA: Harvard University Press, ISBN 0-674-99605-4.
