= Theras =

Mythical founder of Thera

Theras (Ancient Greek: Θήρας) was a regent of Sparta, a son of Autesion and the brother of Aristodemos' wife Argeia, a Cadmid of Theban descent. He served as regent for his nephews Eurysthenes and Procles.

The island of Thera (now Santorini) was named for Theras who, with fellow Spartans, colonized the island.

== Sources ==
- Herodotus, Histories, 4.147-148
- Pausanias, Description of Greece, 3.1.6-7, 3.15.6, 3.15.8
