= Merope (wife of Polybus) =

In Greek mythology, Merope (Ancient Greek: Μερόπη, romanized: Merópē, lit. 'with her face turned', derived from μέρος meros "part" and ὤψ ops "face, eye"; pronounced /ˈmɛrəpiː/, MEH-roh-pee) was a Queen of Corinth, and wife of King Polybus. In some accounts, she was called Periboea.

== Mythology ==
In the most versions of the myth of Oedipus, Merope is generally considered a minor character as simply the wife of King Polybus, the queen of Corinth, adoptive mother to Oedipus, and the adoptive grandmother to Oedipus’ children. After Oedipus is abandoned as an infant by his biological parents King Laius and Queen Jocasta of Thebes, Merope and Polybus raise Oedipus as their adoptive son. Eventually, when questioned by Oedipus, Merope and Polybus deny the adoption. As a result of this denial, Oedipus continues to believe that Merope and Polybus are his true biological parents. Later, when Oedipus receives a prophecy from the oracle in Delphi that he was destined to murder his father and marry his mother, he does not return to Corinth and thereby sets in motion the events that result in his murder of Laius and marriage of Jocasta.
