= Tisamenus (King of Thebes) =

In Greek mythology, Tisamenus (Ancient Greek: Τισαμενός, romanized: Tisamenós) was a king of Thebes, son of Thersander and Demonassa, the daughter of Amphiaraus. When Thersander died on Mysia in the Trojan War, Peneleos acted as regent for Tisamenus until he came of age. Little is known about his rule. He was succeeded by his son Autesion.

Regnal titles
| Preceded by Thersander | King of Thebes | Succeeded by Autesion |
