= Damasichthon (King of Thebes) =

In Greek mythology, Damasichthon (Ancient Greek: Δαμασίχθων, romanized: Damasíkhthōn) was a king of Thebes and the son of Opheltes, purported to be son to Peneleos (regent of Thebes).

== Mythology ==
As Autesion, king of Thebes, left the city in obedience to an oracle, Damasichthon was designated as his successor. Damasichthon was the father of Ptolemy, who took over the government after him.

Regnal titles
Preceded by Autesion	Mythical King of Thebes	Succeeded by Ptolemy

== See also ==
- Theban cycle
