= Xanthos (king of Thebes) =

King of Thebes in Greek mythology

Xanthos (Ancient Greek: Ξάνθος, romanized: Xánthos), son of Ptolemy, was the king of Thebes, the 16th and final monarch that ruled the city. He was possibly king only temporarily, being shown at times as the king of the Boeotians, the King of the Thebians.

According to legend, Xanthos waged war against Athens and challenged its king Thymoetes of Attica to a duel. Thymoetes sent Melanthus in his place, who managed to defeat Xanthos through deceit. As Xanthos and Melanthus approached one another on the battlefield, Melanthus complained to his adversary that the duel was unfair, since there was a second man in a black goat skin (identified with Dionysus) behind him. As Xanthos turned his back to look at the supposed man who was with him, Melanthus killed Xanthos with his blade, ending the war and becoming the new King of Athens. Another version of events by Pausanias, states that it was Melanthus' father Andropompus who killed Xanthos.

This victory was celebrated by all Ionian cities, except for Ephesus and Colophon, in the festival of Apaturia.

Regnal titles
Preceded by Ptolemy	Mythical King of Thebes	Succeeded by None
