= Argia (daughter of Adrastus) =

Greek mythological figure

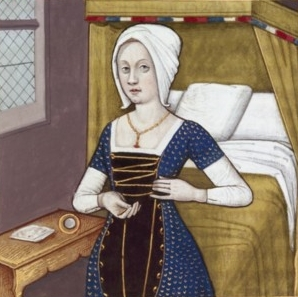
"Argia" in the Bibliothèque nationale de France

In Greek mythology, Argia /ɑːrˈdʒaɪə/ or Argea /ɑːrˈdʒiːə/ (Ancient Greek: Ἀργεία Argeia) was a daughter of King Adrastus of Argos, and of Amphithea, daughter of Pronax. She was married to Polynices, the exiled king of Thebes, and bore him three sons: Thersander, Adrastus, and Timeas.

== Mythology ==
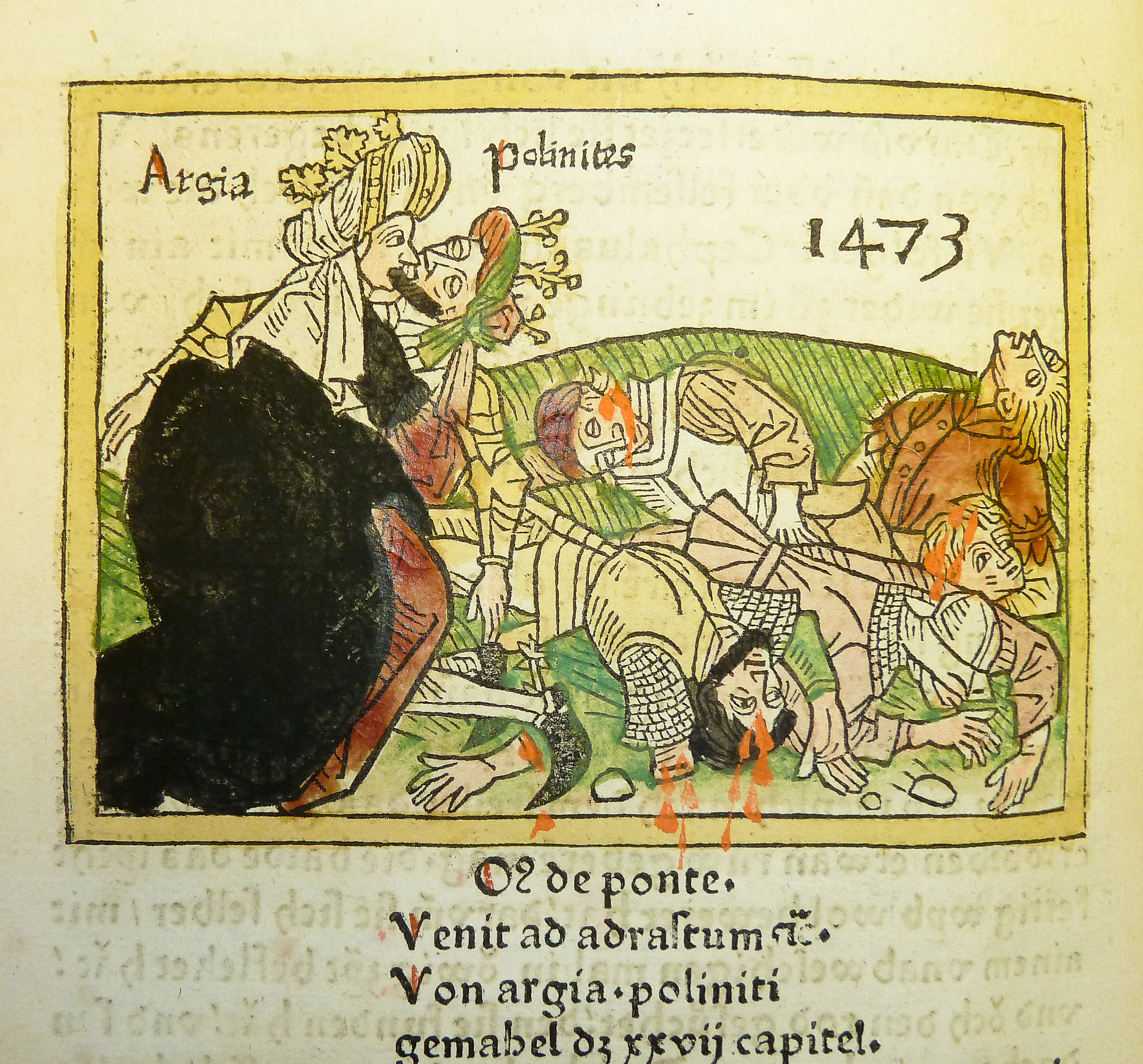
Woodcut illustration of Argia and Polynices (1473)

When Oedipus had died at Thebes, Argia came with others to the funeral of Oedipus, her father-in-law.

== Middle Age tradition ==
She is remembered in De Mulieribus Claris, a collection of biographies of historical and mythological women by the Florentine author Giovanni Boccaccio, composed in 1362–63. It is notable as the first collection devoted exclusively to biographies of women in Western literature.

In Dante's Inferno, she is found in Limbo.

== See also ==
- Phoenician Women
- Hyginus, who in his Fabulae (Latin) calls her Argia.
- Robert Graves in his popular The Greek Myths (106c) prefers the spelling Aegeia.
- Euripides in The Phoenician Women and Suppliants, who mentions the wedding without giving her name.
