= Dirce =

Greek mythological Theban princess

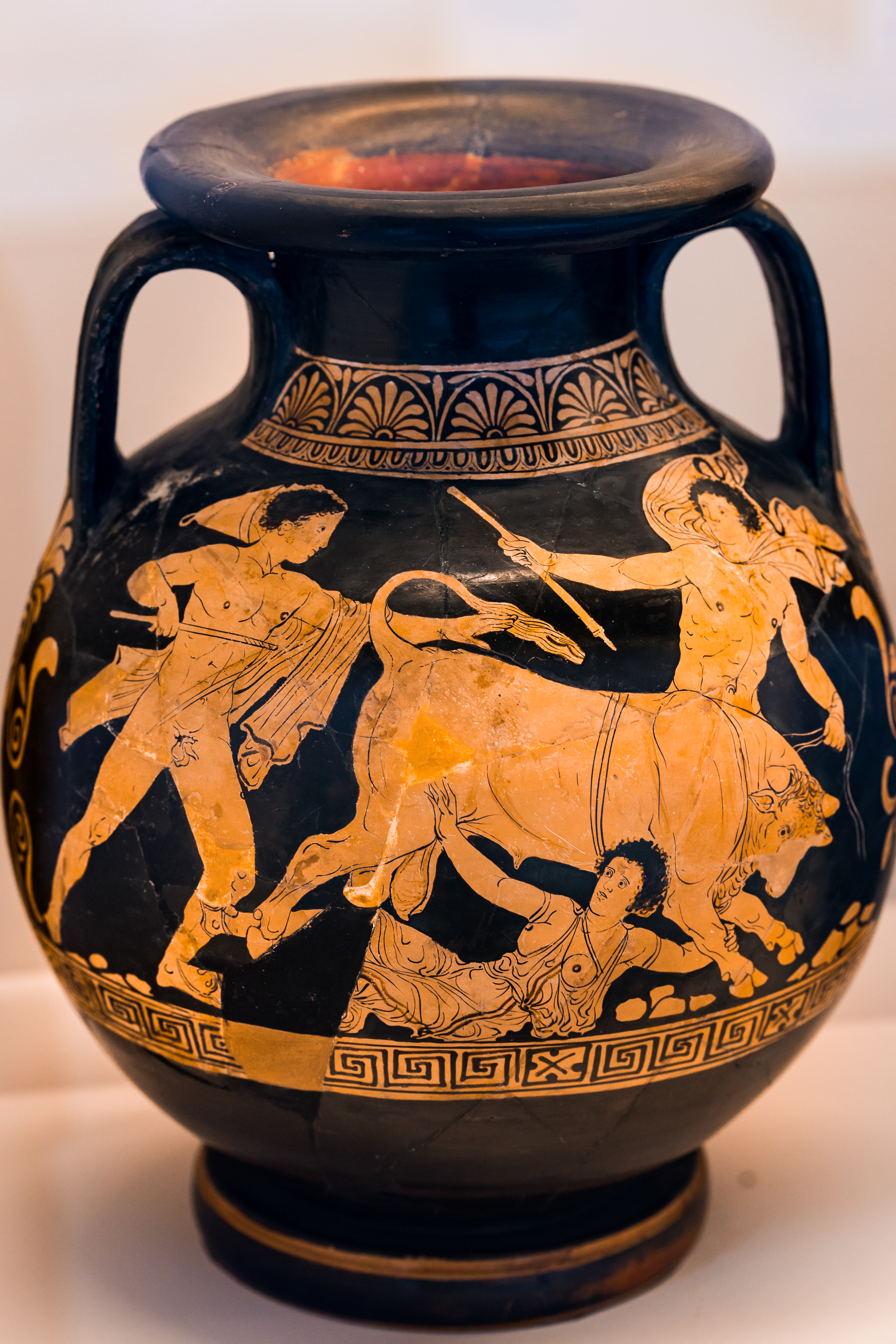
The punishment of Dirce on a Lucanian red-figure pelike from Policoro (ancient Herakleia), c. 400 BCE

Dirce (/ˈdɜːrsiː/; Ancient Greek: Δίρκη, romanized: Dírkē, lit. 'double' or 'cleft', pronounced [dírkɛː], modern Greek [ˈðirci],) was a queen of Thebes as the wife of Lycus in Greek mythology.

== Family ==
Dirce was a daughter of the river-gods Achelous or Ismenus, or of Helios.

== Mythology ==
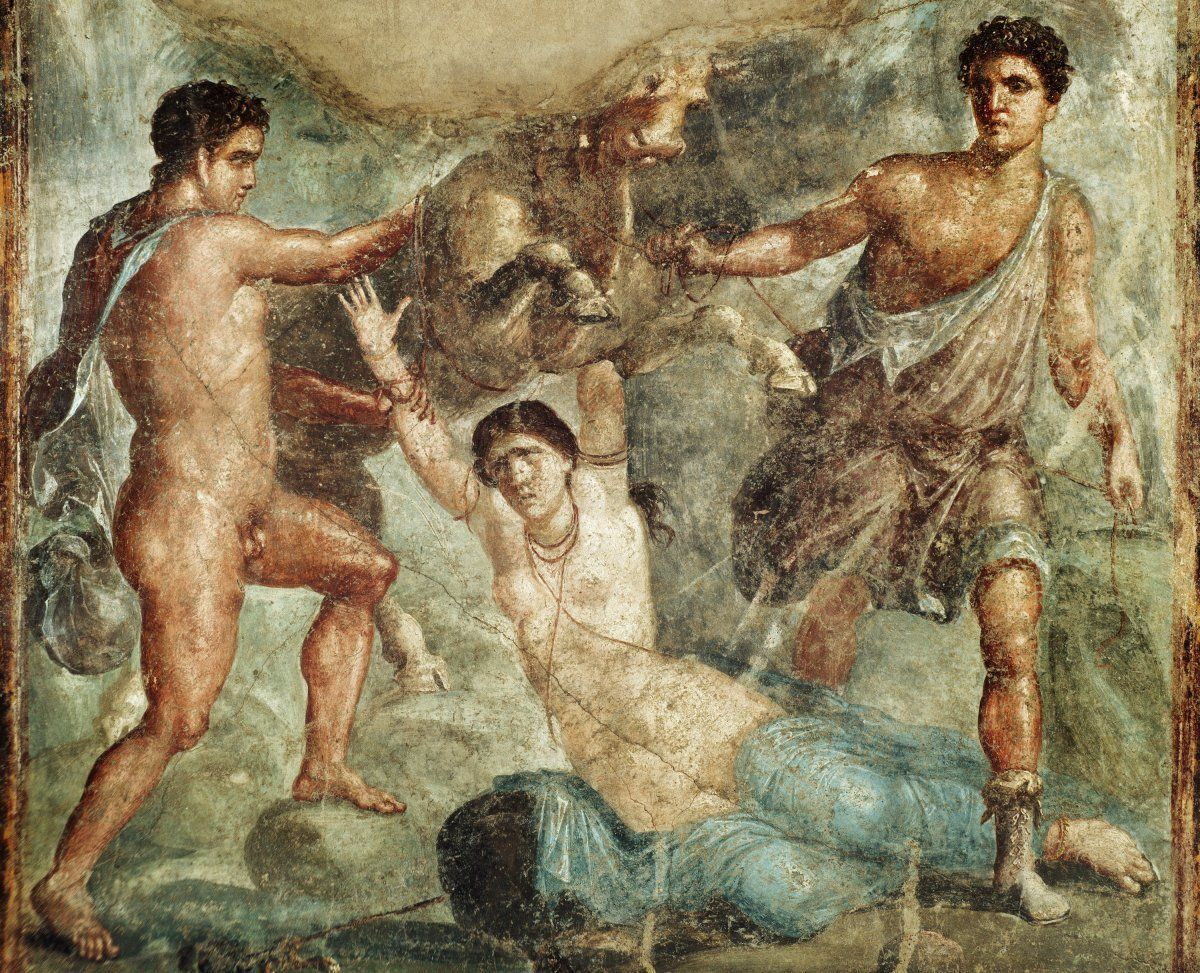
Amphion and Zethus subject Dirce to the bull, from the House of the Vettii, Pompeii, 1st century CE

After Zeus impregnated Dirce's niece-by-marriage Antiope, the latter fled in shame to King Epopeus of Sicyon, but was brought back by Lycus through force, giving birth to the twins Amphion and Zethus on the way. Lycus gave Antiope to Dirce. Dirce hated Antiope and treated her cruelly, until Antiope, after many years, escaped.

In Euripides's lost play Antiope, Antiope flees back to the cave where she gave birth to Amphion and Zethus; they are now living there as young men. They disbelieve her claim to be their mother and refuse her pleas for sanctuary, but when Dirce comes to find Antiope and orders her to be killed, the twins are convinced by the shepherd who raised them that Antiope is their mother. They kill Dirce by tying her to the horns of a bull.

Dirce was devoted to the god Dionysus, who caused a spring to flow where she died, either at Mount Cithaeron or at Thebes, and it was a local tradition for the outgoing Theban hipparch to swear in his successor at her tomb. In Statius's Thebaid, the spring is a symbol of Thebes, and its name is often used metonymically to refer to the city itself.

== In Roman culture ==
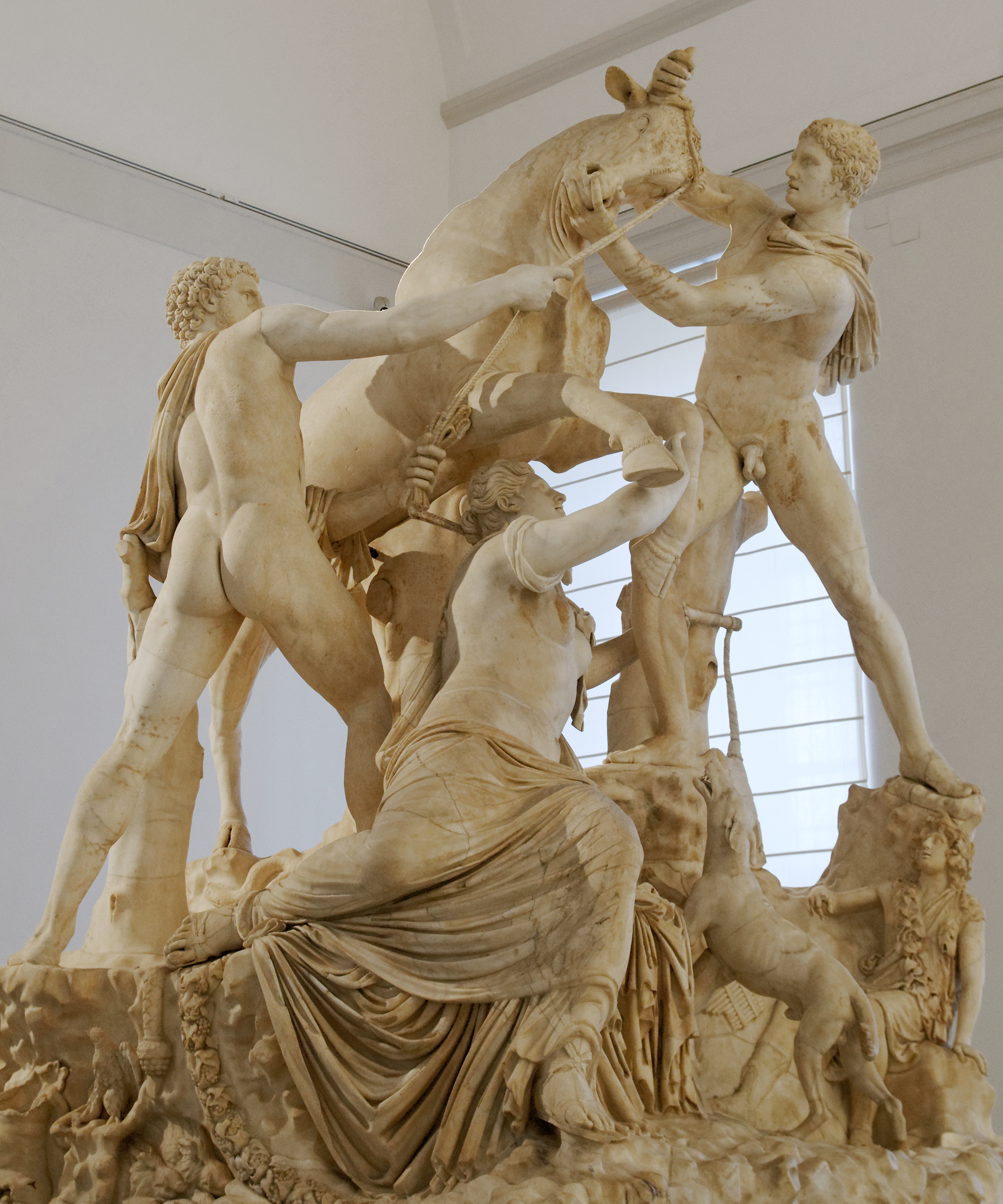
The Farnese Bull

The death of Dirce is depicted in a marble statue known as the Farnese Bull, which is now in the collections of the National Archaeological Museum in Naples. The colossal piece, a first-century-AD Roman copy of a second-century-BC Hellenistic Greek original, was first excavated in the 16th century in the Baths of Caracalla. Some scholars identify it with the statue group mentioned in Pliny's Natural History, but this is disputed.

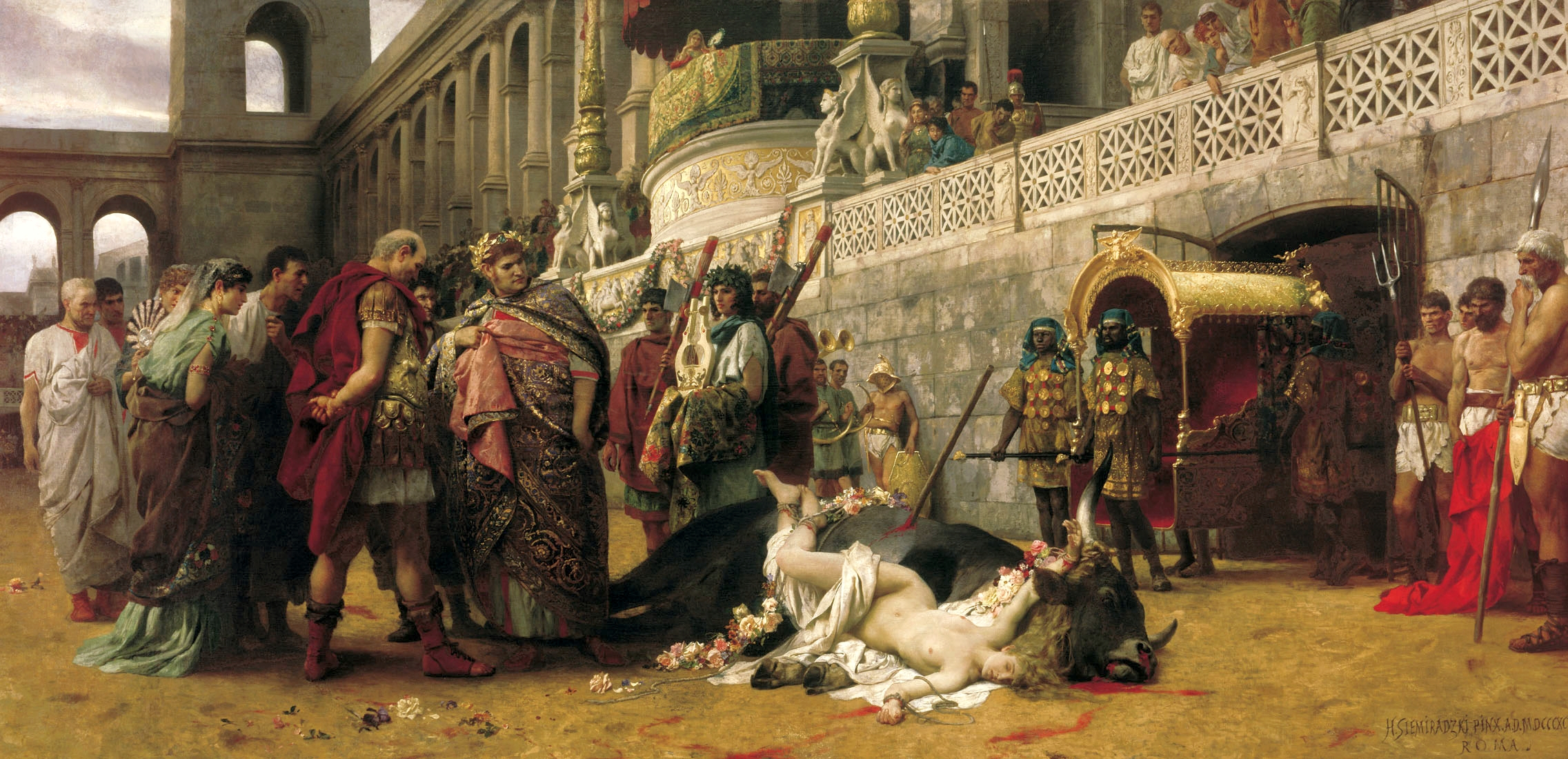
A Christian Dirce, by Henryk Siemiradzki.

This scene was recreated in spectacles in the Roman arena.
