= Ptolemy of Thebes =

Ruler of Thebes in Greek mythology

In Greek mythology, Ptolemy or Ptolomeus (/ˈtɒləmi/;Ancient Greek: Πτολεμαῖος) was an ancestral ruler of Thebes, in ancient Greece living in the 12th century BCE. His father was Damasichthon; his son, Xanthus. Since the Homeric root to Ptolemy includes no "T", the name is reconstructed as Polemy.

Regnal titles
Preceded by Damasichthon	Mythical King of Thebes	Succeeded by Xanthus
