= Anaxo =

Set of mythological Greek characters

In Greek mythology, Anaxo (Ancient Greek: Ἀναξώ, lit. 'lady', 'mistress' or 'female ruler') is the name that may refer to:

- Anaxo, daughter of Alcaeus and granddaughter of Perseus
- Anaxo, a girl from Troezen abducted by Theseus.
