= Greek Heroic Age =

Historic era of Mediterranean history

The Greek Heroic Age, in mythology, is the period between the coming of the Greeks to Thessaly and the Greek warriors' return from Troy. The poet Hesiod (fl. c. 700 BCE) identified this mythological era as one of his five Ages of Man. The period spans roughly six generations; the heroes denoted by the term are superhuman, though not divine, and are celebrated in the literature of Homer and of others, such as Sophocles, Aeschylus, and Euripides.

The Greek heroes can be grouped into an approximate mythic chronology based on the stories of events such as the Argonautic expedition and the Trojan War. Over time, many heroes, such as Heracles, Achilles, Hector, and Perseus, came to figure prominently in Greek mythology.

== Early heroes ==
Many early Greek heroes were descended from the gods and were part of the founding narratives of various city-states. They also became the ancestors of later heroes. The Phoenician prince Cadmus, a grandson of Poseidon, was the first Greek hero and the founder of Thebes.

Perseus, famous for his exploits well before the days of his great-grandson, Heracles, was the son of Zeus. Perseus beheaded the gorgon Medusa, saved Andromeda from the sea monster Cetus, and was the legendary founder of Mycenae.

Aeacus was also a son of Zeus. Bellerophon was descended from the nymph Orseis. Oenomaus, king of Pisa, in the Peloponnese, was the son of Ares.

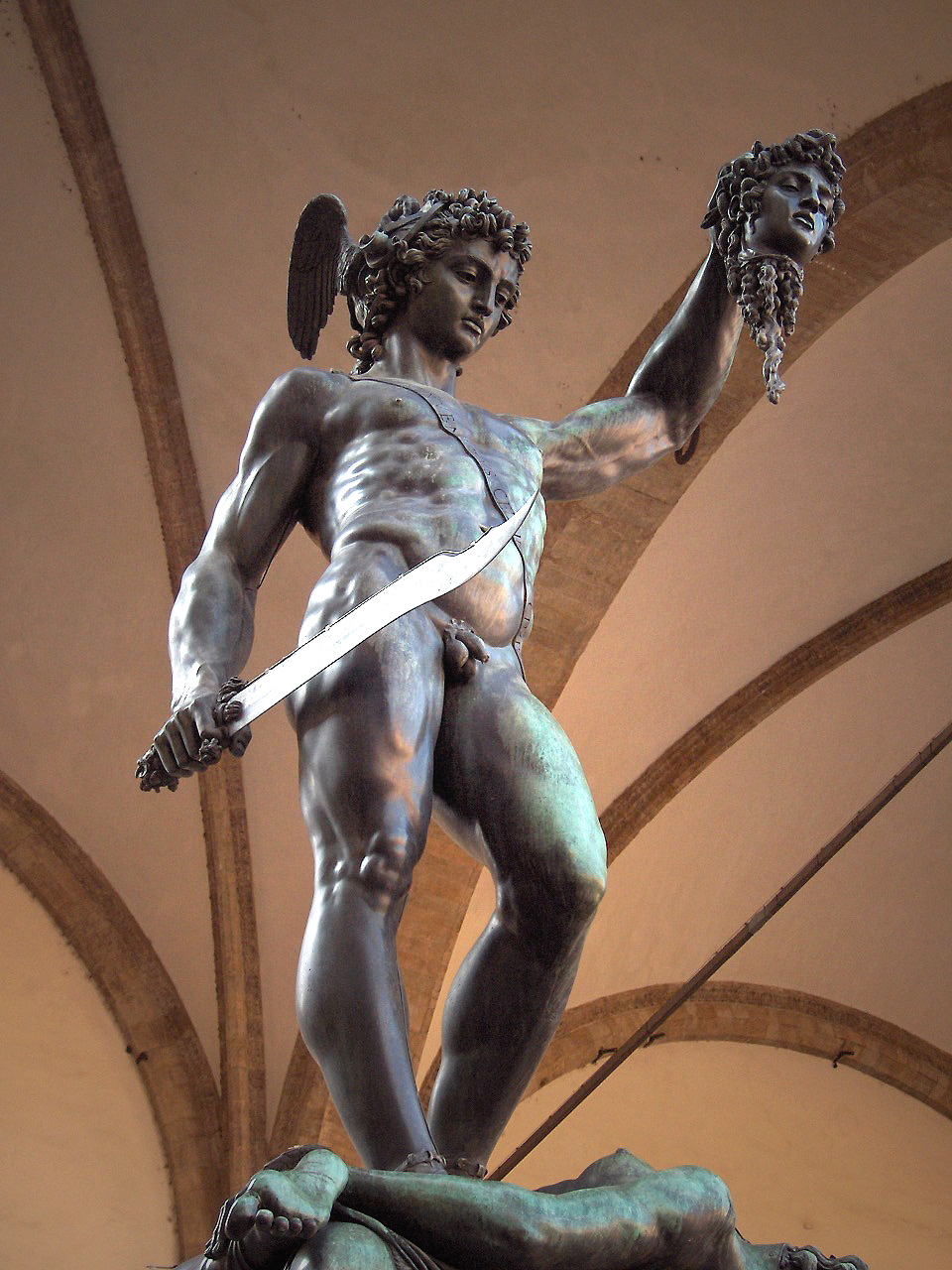
Perseus, son of Zeus, after beheading Medusa.

Among these early heroes, the three - Cadmus, Perseus, and Bellerophon - were considered the greatest Greek heroes and slayers of monsters before the days of Heracles.

- Aeacus
- Bellerophon
- Cadmus
- Perseus
- Electryon

== Heroes in Art ==
Heroes in the Greek Heroic Age are often depicted on vases, expressing a portion of their story. Greek Hero Heracles is a popular icon among vases and paintings in early art. Moments in history from this period are also captured in statues, such as Perseus with the head of Medusa, the Statue of Achilles, and the Pasquino Group. Polykleitos of Argos is a famous Greek sculptor who transformed Greek myth through bronze and marble sculptures and primarily created a system for the reproduction of art to occur.

== Argonauts ==
The myth of Jason and the Golden Fleece is one of the oldest stories of a hero's quest. Jason sailed on the Argo, and those who accompanied him were called the "Argonauts". Their mission was to travel to the kingdom of Colchis, on the Black Sea, to obtain the "Golden Fleece", a symbol of authority and kingship. With it, Jason would become king of Iolcos in Thessaly.

The Argonauts:

- Atalanta
- Autolycus
- Calais
- Castor and Pollux
- Echion
- Euphemus
- Euryalus
- Heracles
- Hylas
- Idas
- Idmon
- Jason (the leader)
- Laertes
- Lynceus
- Meleager
- Nestor
- Oileus
- Orpheus
- Peleus
- Periclymenus
- Poeas
- Polyphemus
- Telamon
- Theseus
- Tiphys
- Zetes

== Calydonian boar hunt ==
Artemis sent a monstrous boar to ravage the region of Calydon in Aetolia because its king neglected to honour her in his rites to the gods. King Oeneus sent messengers seeking the best hunters in Greece, offering them the boar's pelt and tusks as a prize. Several heroes responded, including Atalanta, Castor and Pollux, Jason, Laertes, Lynceus, Meleager (the host and boar killer), Nestor, Peleus, Phoenix, and Theseus. Many of them were also the "Argonauts". One notable exception was Heracles, who vanquished his own Goddess-sent Erymanthian boar separately.

== Others ==
- Hippodamia
- Laius
- Minos
- Pelops
- Rhadymanthus
- Sarpedon

== Generation of Oedipus ==
(about two generations before Troy)

The story of Oedipus is the basis of a trilogy of plays by Sophocles; however, similar stories have been traced to cultures worldwide.

- Plisthenes
- Atreus
- Thyestes
- Chrysippus
- Copreus
- Oedipus
- Creon
- Laodamia

== Generation of the Seven against Thebes ==
(about a generation before Troy)

Oedipus places a curse upon his sons Eteocles and Polynices. The underlying theme in the story of the "Seven Against Thebes" is the fulfilment of that curse. Although the brothers had agreed to share the rule of Thebes, when it was time for Eteocles to step aside, he refused, and Polynices brought an army against his beloved city to enforce his claim. In Aeschylus' play, the concept of the individual vs. community becomes a central theme. In the Phoenissae (The Phoenician Women), patriotism is a significant theme.

- Adrastus
- Amphiaraus
- Capaneus
- Hippomedon
- Parthenopaeus
- Polynices
- Tydeus
- Adrastus
- Creon
- Megareus
- Periclymenus
- Melanippus
- Polyphontes
- Hyperbius
- Actor
- Lasthenes
- Antigone
- Ismene

== Generation of the Trojan War ==
See Trojan War and Epigoni.

Gregory Nagy sees mortality as the "dominant theme in the stories of ancient Greek heroes." Heading for Troy, Achilles opts for a short life, leaving a memory of being immortal and renowned over a long, peaceful life in relative obscurity.

- Achilles
- Agamemnon (the leader)
- Ajax the Great
- Ajax the Lesser
- Diomedes
- Idomeneus
- Menelaus
- Odysseus
- Patroclus
- Philoctetes

== Greek Heroes in The Iliad ==
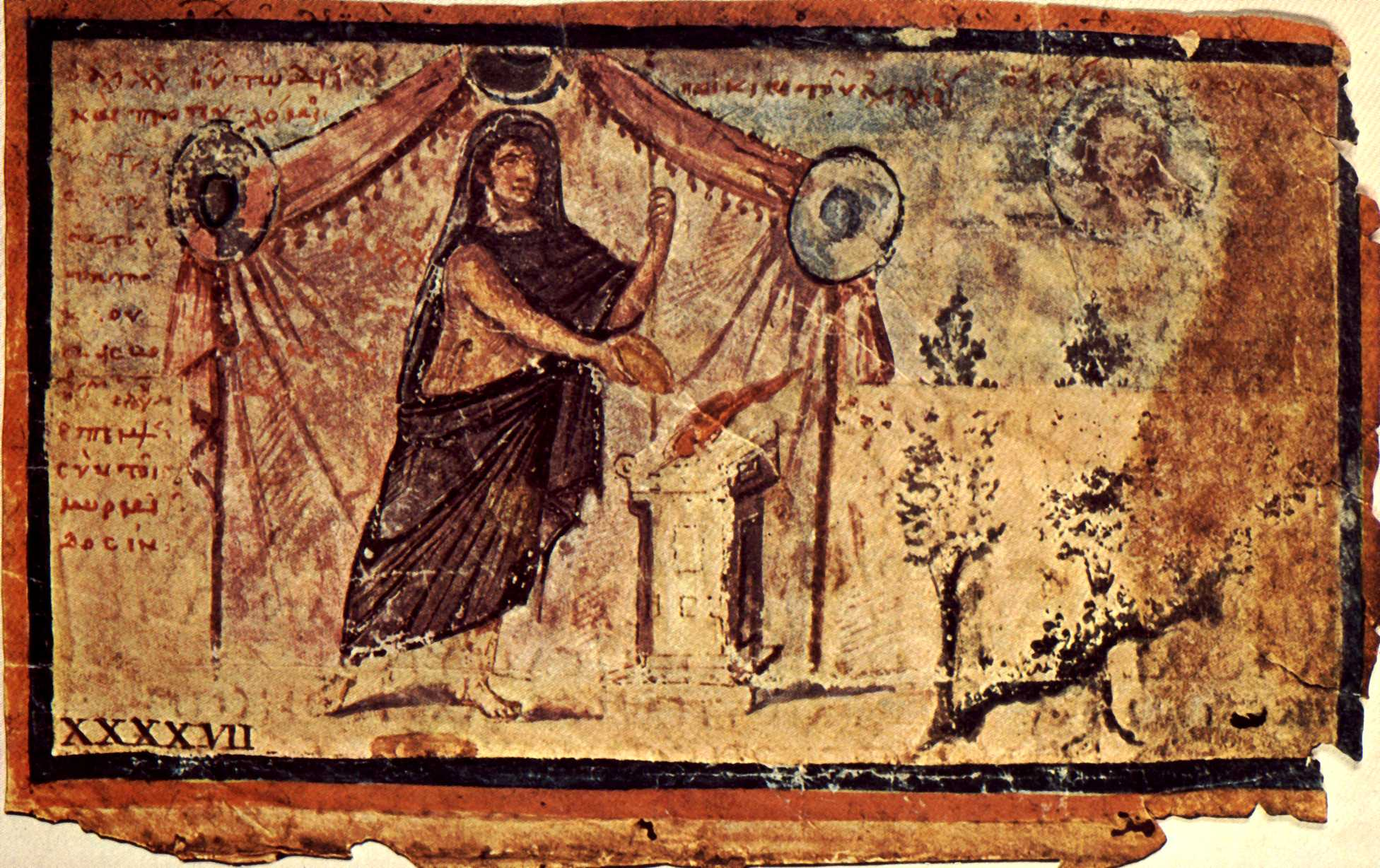
Achilles making a sacrifice to Zeus for Patroclus from The Iliad.

Face of the Trojan War, Achilles helped escalate the war after killing the Trojan Prince Hector. A description of the Trojan War is given to audiences through a telling of the myth in the form of a poem by the Greek poet Homer, titled The Iliad.

== Generation after the Trojan War ==
- Electra
- Iphigenia
- Nausicaa
- Neoptolemus
- Orestes
- Telemachus
- Hyllus

== See also ==
- Bronze Age collapse
