= Hippomedon (Seven against Thebes) =

Figure form the Theban legend

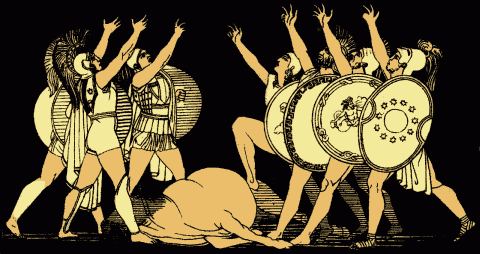
The Oath of the Seven Chiefs, Greek Mythology

In Greek mythology, Hippomedon /hɪˈpɒmɪdən/ (Ἰππομέδων, gen.: Ἰππομέδοντος) was one of the Seven against Thebes. He lived near the lake Lerna in Peloponessus; the foundations of his house on Mount Pontinus at Lerna were shown in Pausanias' times. In Euripides' The Suppliants, he is characterized as a person uninterested in comfort and entertainments, eager to face hardships, and dedicating a lot of time to training for combat.

== Family ==
Hippomedon's father was either Talaus, the father of Adrastus, or Aristomachus (a son of Talaus), or Mnesimachus. If he is the son of Mnesimachus, then his mother is Metidice, daughter of Talaus, which makes him Adrastus's sister's son. By Euanippe, daughter of Elatus, Hippomedon was father of Polydorus, one of the Epigoni. Elsewhere though, his wife is named Nealce, and the son Demophon.

== Mythology ==
In Aeschylus' tragedy Seven Against Thebes, Hippomedon is one of the seven champions who attack the seven gates of Thebes. Aeschylus describes him as very large and powerful. He bears the image of a fire-breathing typhon on his shield and attacks the gate of Athena Onca, and is confronted by Hyperbius, son of Oenops. In Euripides' Phoenician Women, he has the image of Argus Panoptes on his shield and assails the Ogygian Gates. According to the Bibliotheca, he was killed in the battle by Ismarus, a son of Astacus.

Hippomedon makes a prolonged appearance in Statius' Thebaid. In Book 9 he engages in the fight over the body of Tydeus, and when the attempt to seize it back from the Thebans fails, he goes on slaying one opponent after another and in the course of the battle, descends into the waters of River Ismenus. One of his victims is the young Crenaeus, son of Pan and the nymph Ismenis. The latter, upon discovering her son's dead body, implores her father, the river god Ismenus, to avenge the youth's death. Ismenus raises the waters of his river and nearly drowns Hippomedon, but he prays that he may not die a death like that, and Hera persuades Zeus to make Ismenus spare him. However, Hippomedon gets out of the water unarmored and is met with a storm of the enemy's missiles, which kill him. Hypseus then takes his helmet as trophy and announces his death to the allies, shortly before getting killed by Capaneus.
