= Seven against Thebes =

Greek mythological champions who made war against Thebes

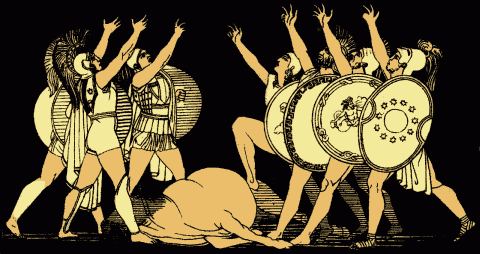
The Seven champions swearing an oath, illustration from Stories from the Greek Tragedians, by Alfred Church, 1879.

The Seven against Thebes (Ancient Greek: Ἑπτὰ ἐπὶ Θήβας, Hepta epi Thēbas) were seven champions in Greek mythology who made war on Thebes. They were chosen by Adrastus, the king of Argos, to be the captains of an Argive army whose purpose was to restore Oedipus' son Polynices to the Theban throne. Adrastus, although always the leader of the expedition against Thebes, was not always counted as one of the Seven champions. Usually the Seven were Polynices, Tydeus, Amphiaraus, Capaneus, Parthenopaeus, Hippomedon, and either Adrastus or Eteoclus, when Adrastus is excluded. They tried and failed to take Thebes, and all but Adrastus died in the attempt.

On their way to Thebes, the Seven stopped at Nemea, where they held funeral games for the infant Opheltes, which became the origin myth for the Nemean Games. Before arriving at Thebes, Adrastus sent Tydeus on ahead to resolve the dispute through negotiation, which failed. At Thebes, Capaneus was struck down by Zeus' thunderbolt while attempting to scale the city walls. Tydeus was mortally wounded, and although Athena intended to make him immortal, she let him die when she saw him eating the brains of his attacker. Polynices was killed by (and killed) his brother Eteocles, the seer Amphiaraus was swallowed up by the earth, and Adrastus escaped the battlefield on his divine horse Arion. The victorious Thebans refused to allow the burial of the Argive dead, but Theseus marched an Athenian army to Thebes and recovered the bodies of the fallen warriors.

The war of the Seven against Thebes occurred in the generation prior to that of the Trojan War. According to Hesiod's Works and Days, these two wars were the two great events of the fourth age, the age of heroes. The Seven's war against Thebes was the first of two Theban wars. The second Theban war was fought, and won, ten years later by the Seven's sons, the Epigoni.

== The war against Thebes ==
=== Polynices and Eteocles ===
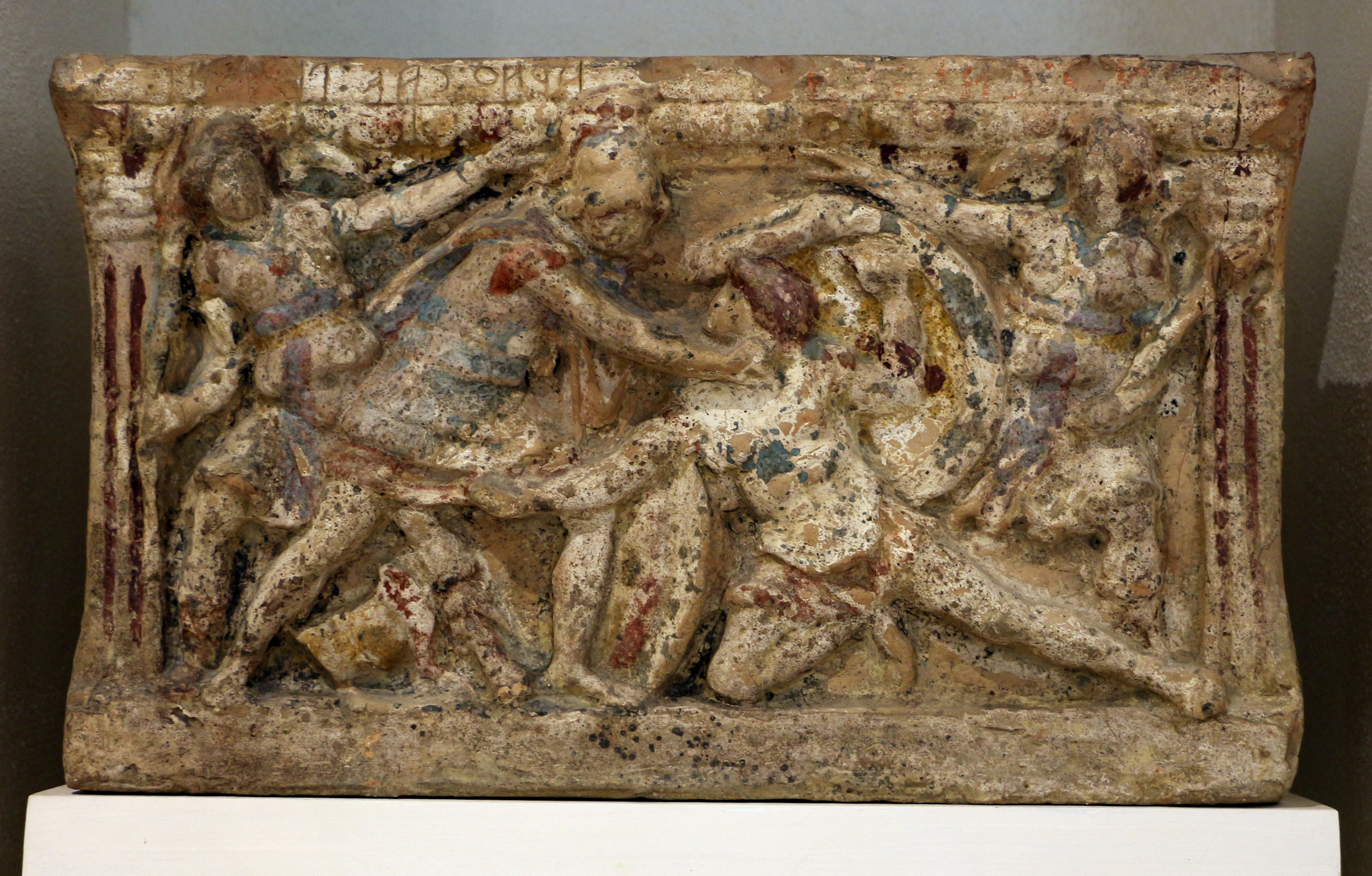
Etruscan funerary urn showing the battle of Polynices and Eteocles, in the Museo archeologico e d'arte della Maremma

The war of the Seven against Thebes resulted from a quarrel between the brothers Polynices and Eteocles over the kingship of Thebes. Polynices and Eteocles had been cursed by their father Oedipus, the former king of Thebes, to battle over their patrimony. The curse inexorably led to the brothers' quarrel, their killing each other, and the Argive disaster at Thebes.

After Oedipus had vacated the throne, according to some accounts, it was agreed that Eteocles would inherit the throne, and that Polynices would take a share of the household property, while according to a different account, Eteocles forced Polynices into exile. However, in what became the most familiar version of the story, first occurring in Euripides' Phoenician Women, the brothers agreed to share the throne, with each ruling in alternate years, but after the first year Eteocles refused to relinquish the throne.

In the Phoenician Women, Polynices is clearly the hero while Eteocles is the villain. However, in the versions of the story in which Polynices agreed to property in return for relinquishing his right to the throne, he would seem to be to blame for the war. In any case, Eteocles ended up as king, and Polynices in exile.

=== Army assembled ===
When Polynices left Thebes he went to Argos where he married Argia, the daughter of Adrastus the king of Argos, and gained the support of his father-in-law for an expedition against Thebes. In a story first encountered in Euripides, we hear that Polynices arrived at Adrastus' palace at night, seeking shelter. He found a place to sleep, but soon after Tydeus, the exiled son of the Calydonian king Oeneus, also arrived seeking shelter, and the two began to fight over the same space. When Adrastus discovered Polynices and Tydeus fighting like wild beasts (or in later accounts when he saw that Polynices wore the hide of a lion and that Tydeus wore the hide of a boar, or that they had those animals on their shields), he remembered an oracle of Apollo that said he should marry his daughters to a lion and a boar. So Adrastus gave his daughters to the two exiled foreign princes, and promised to restore them to their kingdoms, beginning with Polynices.

Adrastus proceeded to assemble a large army to attack Thebes, appointing seven champions to be its leaders. These became known as the Seven against Thebes. One of those chosen, the seer Amphiaraus, had foreseen that the expedition was doomed to fail, and that all of the champions but Adrastus would die, and so refused to join. But when Polynices bribed Amphiaraus' wife Eriphyle to tell her husband to join the expedition, he was forced to obey because of a promise Amphiaraus had made to allow his wife, who was also Adrastus' sister, to settle any disputes between the two men.

According to the Iliad, Tydeus and Polynices went to Mycenae to recruit allies for the war, but the Mycenaeans, who at first agreed, finally declined because of ill omens sent by Zeus.

=== Death of Opheltes ===
As the army of the Seven marched toward Thebes, they passed through Nemea. There they encountered Hypsipyle, the nursemaid of Opheltes, the infant son of Lycurgus. Needing water, the Seven asked Hypsipyle to direct them to a spring. But while doing this she sat Opheltes down, and the unattended child was killed by a serpent. The Seven killed the serpent, and interceded on Hypsipyle's behalf, as she was being threatened with death for her negligence. Amphiaraus renamed the child Archemorus, meaning the "Beginning of Doom", interpreting the child's death as a harbinger of the Seven's own impending doom at Thebes. The Seven held funeral games in the child's honor, which became the origin of the Nemean Games.

=== Embassy of Tydeus ===
As the Argive army was nearing Thebes, Tydeus was sent ahead alone, on an embassy to the city, to try to negotiate a peaceful settlement of the succession dispute. As recounted in the Iliad, Tydeus found the Theban leaders feasting at the house of Eteocles, and challenged them all to many contests, and (with Athena's help) won every one. In anger, fifty Thebans, led by Maeon, Haemon's son, and Polyphontes, Autophonus' son, ambushed Tydeus as he was returning to his army. But Tydeus killed them all, sparing only Maeon, whom he sent home in obedience to the gods.

=== Assault on Thebes ===
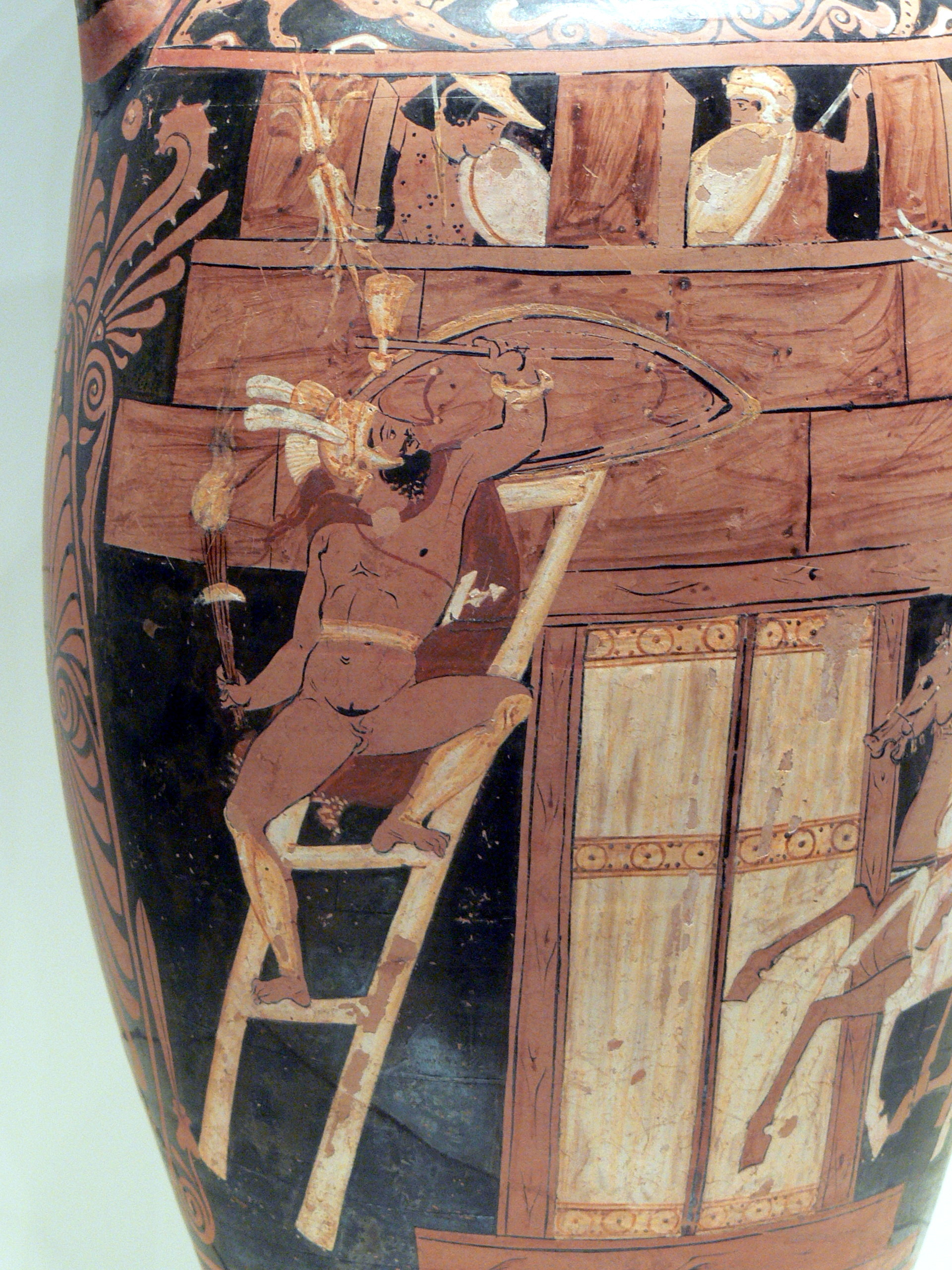
Capaneus scales the city wall of Thebes, Campanian red-figure Neck-amphora attributed to the Caivano Painter, ca. 340 BC, J. Paul Getty Museum (92.AE.86).

When the army of the Seven reached Thebes, they proceeded to launch an attack on the city. In a story first attested in Euripides' The Phoenician Women, the seer Tiresias prophesied that Thebes would be saved if Creon's son Menoeceus (previously unknown) sacrificed himself, which he did.

Capaneus impiously boasted that not even Zeus could keep him from burning the city. But, as he was scaling the walls, Zeus struck him down with a thunderbolt. Tydeus was mortally wounded by Melanippus, the son of Astacus. A favorite of Athena, the goddess intended to make Tydeus immortal, but the seer Amphiaraus, knowing this, and hating Tydeus, cut off Melanippus' head and gave it to Tydeus, who proceeded to eat the brains of his killer. As was Amphiaraus' intention, Athena was so appalled that she changed her mind and let Tydeus die. Amphiaraus was himself chased from the battlefield by Periclymenus, who had already killed Parthenopaeus. As Amphiaraus was about to be killed by Periclymenus' spear in his back, Zeus intervened, causing the earth to open and swallow up Amphiaraus, along with his chariot and charioteer. At some point in the battle, Polynices and Eteocles met in single combat, and killed each other. According to the mythographer Apollodorus, Eteoclus and Hippomedon were killed by Leades and Ismarus, brothers of Melanippus. All of the Seven perished except Adrastus, who managed to escape, carried from the battlefield by his divine horse Arion.

=== Burial ===
According to accounts first occurring in fifth-century BC Greek tragedy, after the failed assault on Thebes, Creon, who with the death of Eteocles became the new ruler of Thebes, forbade the burial of the expeditions' dead. In Sophocles' tragedy Antigone, Polynices' sister Antigone, in defiance of Creon's decree, tries to bury her brother, an action that leads to the deaths of Antigone, and Creon's son Haemon.

Athenian tradition held that Theseus, the king and founder-hero of Athens, either by force or negotiation, recovered the bodies of the Seven at Thebes, and buried them at Eleusis. In Euripides' Suppliants, Theseus agrees to assist Adrastus in recovering the bodies of his fallen comrades, which Theseus does after defeating the Thebans in battle. However, in Aeschylus' earlier lost tragedy Eleusinians, evidently Theseus obtained the bodies through negotiation, the version of the story apparently preferred by the Thebans. According to some accounts Polynices was buried at Thebes, the rest being buried at Eleusis. The Iliad has Tydeus buried at Thebes, while Pindar mentions seven funeral pyres there. In the Suppliants, Capaneus' wife Evadne throws herself on her husband's burning pyre.

== The "Seven" champions ==
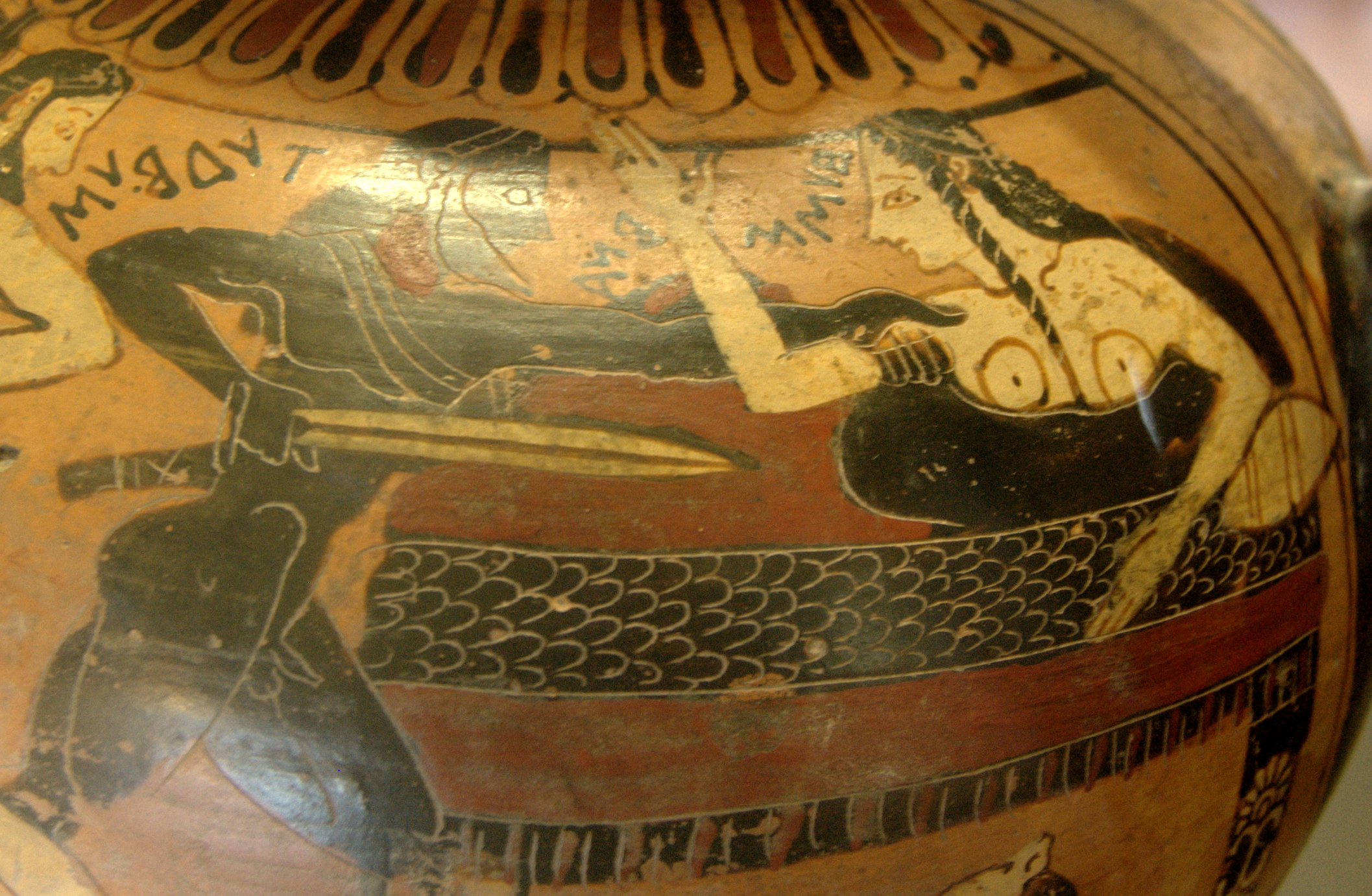
Tydeus kills Ismene, Late Corinthian amphora, c. 560 BC, Louvre (E 640).

Prior to the fifth century BC, the number and names of the "seven" champions is uncertain. Only six names are known for certain, and no specific number. Three of these six were Argives: Adrastus—the son of Talaus, Amphiaraus—the son of Oicles, and Capaneus—the son of Hipponous. The two exiles, Polynices, the son of Oedipus king of Thebes, and Tydeus, the son of Oeneus king of Calydon, were also mentioned by early sources. The sixth, Parthenopaeus, although usually an Arcadian whose mother was Atalanta (as he is in Aeschylus' Seven Against Thebes), in another tradition (attested as early as Hecataeus) he was the son of Talaus, and thus also an Argive and the brother of Adrastus. Pindar does mention the expedition's dead being burned on seven funeral pyres at Thebes, (an idea Pindar possibly took from the Cyclic Thebaid), however whether seven refers to the number of champions is unclear. According to Pausanias, before Aeschylus the number of champions was greater than seven.

The first certain reference to the number of champions being seven, along with a list of their names, occurs in Aeschylus' Seven Against Thebes. This list contains all the names known from earlier sources, excluding Adrastus—who although present at the battle, is not considered by Aeschylus to be one of the "Seven"—while adding two new names: Eteoclus and Hippomedon. The same list of names is given in Euripides' The Suppliants (where Eteoclus is said to be the son of Iphis), and Sophocles' Oedipus at Colonus (where Hippomedon is said to be the son of Talaus, and so the brother of Adrastus). However, Euripides gives a slightly different list in The Phoenician Women, with Adrastus replacing Eteoclus, and this list will be followed by the Greek historian Diodorus Siculus, the mythographers Apollodorus and Hyginus (in the Fabulae), and the Latin poet Statius. Hyginus says that Adrastus chose seven generals (including himself) because Thebes had seven gates.

Apollodorus, however, goes on to say that "some" do not count Tydeus and Polynices among the Seven, but include "Eteoclus, son of Iphis, and Mecisteus", a son of Talaus and another brother of Adrastus. Such a list, with Parthenopaeus considered an Argive, would represent an all-Argive seven, and could have reflected either an original Argive version of the story, before foreigners came to be involved, or a later desire, on the part of the Argives, for an exclusively Argive list. On the other end, Parthenopaeus isn't pictured on a monument in Delphi depicting the Seven described by Pausanias: he might have been replaced by Alitherses, an otherwise unknown character, who also could be a "supernumerary" like Baton, Amphiaraus' charioteer.

Aeschylus, in Seven Against Thebes, assigns each of the Seven to one of the seven gates of Thebes, as do Euripides in The Phoenician Women, and Apollodorus. While the names of the gates are similar among these sources, there is little agreement with respect to the assignments. Aeschylus further assigns a Theban defender to each gate.

The Seven
Champion	Seven Against Thebes		The Suppliants, Oedipus at Colonus	Phoenician Women	Diodorus, Hyginus, Statius	Apollodorus
Champion	Gate	Defender	The Suppliants, Oedipus at Colonus	Gate	Diodorus, Hyginus, Statius	Gate
Tydeus	Proetid	Melanippus	✓	Homoloïd	✓	Crenidian (Fountain)
Capaneus	Electran	Polyphontes	✓	Electran	✓	Ogygian
Eteoclus	Neïstan	Megareus	✓			
Hippomedon	Athena Onca	Hyperbius	✓	Ogygian	✓	Oncaidian
Parthenopaeus	North	Actor	✓	Neïstan	✓	Electran
Amphiaraus	Homoloïd	Lasthenes	✓	Proetid	✓	Proetid
Polynices	Seventh	Eteocles	✓	Crenaean (Fountain)	✓	Hypsistan (Highest)
Adrastus				Seventh	✓	Homoloidian
Mecisteus						

== Principal sources ==
=== Early ===
==== Homer ====
References to the expedition of the Seven occur as early as Homer's Iliad, in which four of the "seven" champions: Adrastus, Tydeus, Polynices, and Capaneus are mentioned. The Iliad refers to Adrastus as king of Sicyon, the father-in law of Tydeus, and as possessing the divine horse Arion. The only references to the expedition itself are an account of Tydeus and Polynices' recruitment mission to Mycenae, and the embassy of Tydeus to Thebes, plus two more mentions of the embassy, and reports of the deaths of Tydeus and Capaneus at Thebes.

In Book 4, Agamemnon says that Tydeus and Polynices came to Mycenae to recruit additional allies for their war on Thebes. The Mycenaeans agreed to join the expedition, and began assembling an army. But they changed their minds when Zeus sent ill omens. Agamemnon also says that—when Tydeus and Polynices left Mycenae, "and were with deep reeds, that coucheth in the grass" (i.e. had reached the Asopos River in Boetia)—Tydeus was sent alone on an embassy to Thebes. There he found the Thebans feasting at the palace of Eteocles. Tydeus challenged all of them to "feats of strength" and was easily victorious in every one, "such a helper was Athene to him." The Thebans were so angry that they sent fifty men, led by Maeon, the son of Haemon, and Polyphontes, Autophonus' son, to ambush Tydeus on the way back to his army. Tydeus killed all of these but Maeon, whom he spared and sent home "in obedience to the portents of the gods".

In Book 5, Athena mentions Tydeus' embassy, saying that although she "bade him feast in their halls in peace", Tydeus challenged the Thebans and easily won everything, "so present a helper was I to him." In Book 10, Tydeus' son Diomedes refers to his father's mission, calling Tydeus a "messenger" who brought a "gentle word" to the Thebans, and about the ambush says that Tydeus devised "terrible" deeds, with Athena's help. From Sthenelus the son of Capaneus, and comrade of Diomedes, we hear that at Thebes "of the seven gates", their fathers "perished through their own blind folly". And finally in Book 14, we learn from Diomedes that Tydeus was buried at Thebes.

In Homer's Odyssey, we hear of a fifth champion, Amphiaraus betrayed by his wife Eriphyle. Book 11 mentions the "hateful Eriphyle, who took precious gold as the price of the life of her own lord". While in Book 15 we learn of Amphiaraus, "the rouser of the host", who, though loved by Zeus and Apollo, died at Thebes, "because of a woman's gifts."

==== Stesichorus, Thebaid, Catalogue of Women, Chest of Kypselos ====
Besides those found in Homer, there are few surviving references to the Seven, and their war against Thebes, before the fifth century BC. The lyric poet Stesichorus (c. 630 – 555 BC) apparently wrote a poem (now lost) about the war against Thebes. Here the seer Tiresias prophesies a threat to Thebes, and the deaths of the brothers Polynices and Eteocles. Seeking to avoid this dire fate, they agree that the kingship would be determined by lot, with one gaining the throne (Eteocles), and the other gaining all their father's possessions, but forced to leave Thebes (Polynices). Tiresias also says that Polynices is destined to go to Argos where Adrastus will give him his daughter.

The Cyclic Thebaid (early sixth century BC?) was a Greek epic poem whose entire subject was the Seven's Theban war, however only a few fragments have survived. The poem's first line began "Sing, goddess, of thirsty Argos, from where the lords ...". We learn that Polynices and Eteocles, were cursed by their father Oedipus, and so doomed to their fatal dispute, and that, during the battle at Thebes, while all the others perished, Adrastus alone was saved thanks to his horse Arion. There is also evidence for the appearance in the poem of Amphiaraus, his death being lamented by Adrastus, calling him "both a good seer and good at fighting with a spear", and possibly also Tydeus eating Melanippus' brains (fr. 9*). In addition to these four of the Seven, already found in Homer, we hear of a new name, Parthenopaeus, who is said to have been killed by Periclymenus. Parthenopaeus is also mentioned by Hecataeus of Miletus, as being the son of Talaus (and so apparently a brother of Adrastus).

Polynices is named in a fragmentary passage from the c. 6th-century BC Hesiodic Catalogue of Women, where he seems to be receiving aid from someone. According to the geographer Pausanias, the brothers Polynices and Eteocles were depicted fighting each other, in the presence of a Ker (a goddess of death) on the Chest of Kypselos at Olympia (late seventh to early sixth century BC).

=== Fifth century BC ===
In contrast to the few early sources, which reveal only scattered traces of the story, in the fifth century BC there are many sources, which taken together complete the story. These include the historians Hellanicus and Pherecydes, the lyric poets Simonides, Bacchylides, and Pindar, and in particular, tragedies from each of the three great tragic poets, Aeschylus (Eleusinians, and Seven Against Thebes), Sophocles (Antigone, and Oedipus at Colonus), and Euripides (Hypsipyle, The Phoenician Women, and The Suppliants).

==== Hellanicus, Simonides, Bacchylides, and Pherecydes ====
In an account (similar to that of Stesichorus' above) attributed to Hellanicus (fr. 98 Fowler), Eteocles offered Polynices a choice: rule Thebes, or take a share of the household treasure and leave, and Polynices took the robe and necklace of Harmonia and went into exile. However, according to Pherecydes (fr. 96 Fowler), Eteocles drove Polynices into exile, by force.

Perhaps the earliest surviving reference to the Seven's stop in Nemea, and the death of the infant Opheltes, occurs in a fragment of Simonides (c. 556–468 BC), who says that "they" (the Seven?) mourned the child's death. A more complete account of the event occurs in a mid-fifth-century BC poem by Bacchylides. The poem refers to the Seven as "the heroes with red shields, the best of the Argives", and says that they established the Nemean Games in honor of "Archemorus", whom a "monstrous" serpent had killed. According to Bacchylides, the death was a "sign of the slaughter to come" (i.e. the disaster awaiting at Thebes). He calls the Argive deaths a "powerful fate", which could not be avoided even though Amphiaraus tried to "persuade them to go back", saying that it was hope, rather than good sense, that sent Adrastus and Polynices to Thebes.

The story of Athena's intention to make Tydeus immortal, was known to both Bacchylides (fr. 41 SM) and Pherecydes (fr. 97 Fowler). According to Pherecydes (as attributed by Iliad 5.126 scholia) as Tydeus is dying, having been wounded by Melanippus, Amphiaraus kills Melanippus, cuts off his head, and throws it to Tydeus, who begins to eat the brains. Athena arrives intending to bestow immortality on Tydeus, but disgusted by his savagery, she changes her mind.

==== Pindar ====
We learn several more details of the story in a poem of Pindar (Nemean 9). We are told of a dispute between Adrastus and Amphiaraus, resulting in Adrastus giving his sister ("man-subduing Eriphyle") to Amphiaraus in marriage. After which:

... they led an army of men to seven-gated Thebes
on a journey with no favorable omens, and Cronus’ son
brandished his lightning and urged them not to set out
recklessly from home, but to forgo the expedition.
But after all, the host was eager to march, with bronze
weapons and cavalry gear, into obvious disaster,

Pindar also alludes to the founding of the Nemean Games, by Adrastus (so also in Nemean 8 and 10). In the fighting at Thebes, Pindar says that, just as Amphiaraus is about to be struck in the back by the spear of Periclymenus, to save him from a warrior's "disgrace", Zeus split the earth with his thunderbolt, and buried Amphiaraus along with his horses. As for the rest of the expedition:

they laid down their sweet homecoming and fed the white-flowering smoke with their bodies,
for seven pyres feasted on the men’s young limbs.

In another poem (Olympian 6) Pindar says that after "the corpses of the seven funeral pyres had been consumed", that Adrastus lamented Amphiaraus' death saying: "I dearly miss the eye of my army, good both as a seer and at fighting with the spear."

==== Eleusinians ====
The prohibition of the burial of the expeditions' dead at Thebes, is first attested for Aeschylus' lost tragedy Eleusinians (c. 500–475 BC). According to Plutarch, Aeschylus' play dealt with the story of the recovery of the dead at Thebes by Theseus, as a favor to Adrastus. Here Theseus recovers the bodies through negotiation, rather than by defeating the Thebans in battle, as in later accounts, such as Euripides' Suppliants (c. 420 BC). The tombs of the Seven, that the geographer Pausanias reports seeing on the road leading out of Eleusis, possibly already existed when Aeschlus' play was written. There is in Eleusis a small road, Επτά Επί Θήβαις ('Seven Against Thebes'), running parallel to the main road leading out of the town. On this street are unmarked, ancient tombs, all but two of which are fenced off (coordinates 38.0464509, 23.5301537).

==== Seven Against Thebes ====
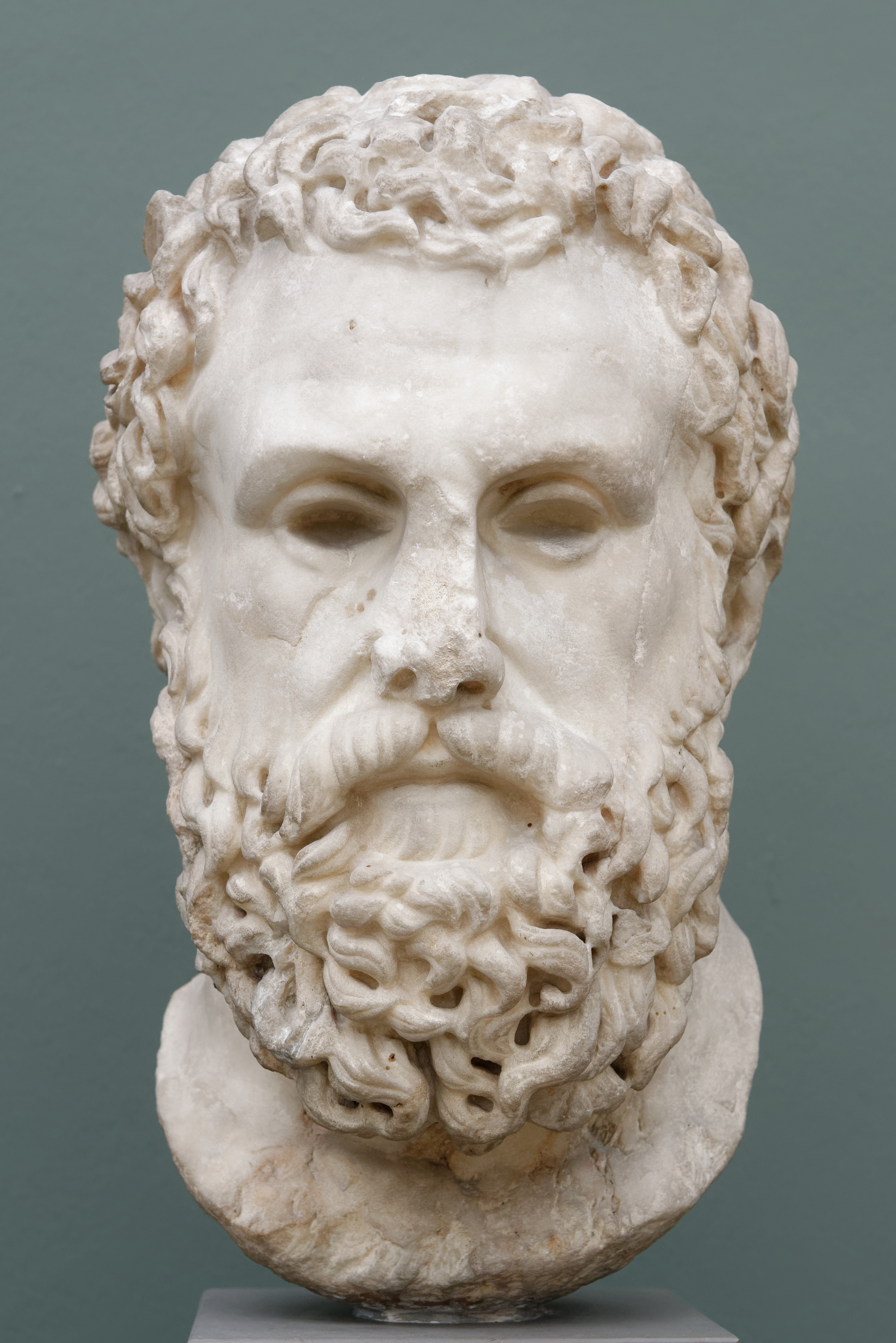
Aeschylus, author of Seven Against Thebes. Roman copy after a Greek original of the 4th century BC

The battle at Thebes is the subject of Aeschylus' Seven Against Thebes (467 BC). This play is the first certain source for the number of the champions being seven. Aeschylus pairs a champion with each of the seven gates of Thebes, each of which is defended by a corresponding Theban champion. Aeschylus has each of the Seven saying a last goodbye to Adrastus—who although present at the battle is not considered by Aeschylus to be one of the Seven champions—and entrusting him with mementos to be given to their families.

Each of the Seven is described in order. The description includes the devices on their shield, their assigned gate, and the gate's Theban defender.

1. Tydeus, on his shield the moon and stars, is assigned the Proetid Gate defended by Melanippus. But he is held back by the seer Amphiaraus because the sacrifices are giving bad signs. "Lusting madly for battle", Tydeus screams insults at Amphiaraus, calling him a coward.

2. Capaneus, on his shield a man holding a torch, with the inscription "I will burn the city", is assigned the Electran Gate defended by Polyphontes. He boasts that he will sack Thebes, and that "not even the weapons of Zeus crashing down to earth will stand in his way or hold him back."

3. Eteoclus, on his shield a man climbing a siege-ladder, is assigned the Neïstan Gate, defended by Megareus, son of Creon.

4. Hippomedon, on his shield the monster Typhon, is assigned the Gate of Athena Onca defended by Hyperbius, the son of Oinops.

5. Parthenopaeus, on his shield a Sphinx, is assigned the North Gate defended by Actor, the brother of Hyperbius. He is said to be a foreign ally of Argos from Arcadia.

6. Amphiaraus, on his shield no image (since, it's said, he prefers reality over appearance) is assigned the Homoloïd Gate defended by Lasthenes. Described as a "man of the highest virtue and an excellent fighter", Amphiaraus yells insults back at Tydeus, calling him "murderer, wrecker of your city, Argos’ great instructor in evil, arouser of a Fury, high priest of Carnage" and blames him for being "Adrastus’ counsellor in these crimes" of attacking Thebes. He also rebukes Polynices for attacking and his own city with a foreign army, and devastating his homeland, saying that for his part he "will enrich this land by becoming a prophet buried in the soil of the enemy."

7. Polynices, on his shield Dike (Justice) leading Polynices back to Thebes, is assigned the Seventh Gate defended by Eteocles.

No details of the actual fighting are given in the play. A messenger simply reports that the city wall has held, and that at the first six gates the city's champions have all won in single combat. But that, at the seventh gate, Polynices and Eteocles, the sons of Oedipus, have killed each other, "in accordance with their father’s curse".

Near the end of the play it is announced that the burial of Polynices is forbidden, and Antigone announces her intention to defy this prohibition. However this scene is generally thought not to have been written by Aeschylus, and to have been added to the play some time after the production of Sophocles's Antigone, which dealt with the same theme.

==== Antigone ====
Sophocles' tragedy Antigone (c. 441 BC), picks up the story of the Seven where Aeschylus' Seven Against Thebes left off. Just as in Aeschylus' play, Sophocles has seven champions face seven defenders at the seven gates of Thebes—with Polynices and Eteocles killing each other—but with no names or other details:

For seven captains posted against seven gates, man against man, left behind their brazen weapons for Zeus the god of trophies, except for the unhappy two, who, sprung of one father and one mother, set their strong spears against each other and both shared a common death.

Without naming him, Sophocles describes Capaneus' death:

For Zeus detests the boasts of a proud tongue, and when he saw them advancing in full flood, with the arrogance of flashing gold, with the fire he hurls he flung down him who was already hastening to shout forth his victory on the topmost ramparts. And he fell upon the hard ground, shaken down, the torchbearer who in the fury of his mad rush breathed upon us with the blast of hateful winds.

Creon, who with the death of Eteocles is now the ruler of Thebes, has forbidden, on pain of death, the burial of Polynices. Polynices' sister Antigone announces her intention to defy Creon and bury her brother, begins the burial, is discovered by guards and arrested, sentenced to death by Creon, and hangs herself. Discounting the probably spurious scene in Aeschylus' Seven Against Thebes, Sophocles' play is our earliest source for any involvement of Antigone in the story of the Seven.

==== The Suppliants ====
Euripides, in his tragedy The Suppliants (c. 420 BC) deals with the recovery of the expedition's dead warriors at Thebes. Adrastus has come to Eleusis, along with the mothers (the Chorus of suppliants) and sons of the Seven, to seek help from the Athenians in the recovery of their dead. In this play we hear for the first time an account of how the war came about. In an initial interview, Adrastus tells Theseus, the king of Athens, that Polynices, because of his father's curse, left Thebes "to avoid killing his brother", but that Eteocles "wronged" Polynices stealing "his property". In exile, Polynices came to Argos at night, fought with Tydeus, another exile who had arrived the same night, and that because of an oracle of Apollo saying he should marry his daughters to "a boar and a lion", and because the two men were fighting like wild beasts, he gave his daughters to the two men. It was to punish the "crime" done to his son-in-law Polynices, that Adrastus marched "seven companies against Thebes". Theseus then asks Adrastus whether he consulted seers and the gods before making war on Thebes, and Adrastus answers that, not only did he go to war "without the gods’ good will", he also "went against the wish of Amphiaraus."

Theseus, having finally been persuaded to help Adrastus, leads an Athenian army to Thebes where—unlike in Aeschylus' Eleusinians in which he is able to accomplish his mission through diplomacy—he must defeat the Thebans in battle in order to bring back to Eleusis the bodies of the fallen warriors. Five of the Seven are brought back, all except Amphiaraus, of whom it is said that "the gods by snatching him away alive, chariot and all, into the depths of the earth openly praise him", and so could not be brought back, and Polynices, who presumably was buried at Thebes. The rest of the Seven's army was buried by Theseus at Eleutherae a small village on the Attic side of Mount Cithaeron.

Adrastus gives a eulogy for the five of the Seven brought back to Eleusis. Here we learn that the Arcadian Parthenopaeus is the son of Atalanta, that Eteoclus is the son of Iphis, and that Iphis' daughter Evadne is married to Capaneus. The complete list given by Euripides is the same list of Seven given by Aeschylus: Tydeus, Capaneus, Eteoclus, Hippomedon, Parthenopaeus, Amphiaraus and Polynices. As for the recovered corpses, Theseus says that Capaneus, who was "struck down by the fire of Zeus", will be burned apart, on a separate funeral-pyre from the rest, who will be burned together on a single pyre. Capaneus' wife Evadne throws herself on his burning pyre. The ashes of the Seven are carried back to Argos by their sons, who vow to avenge their fathers deaths.

==== The Phoenician Women ====
Euripides' The Phoenician Women (c. 410–409 BC), like Aeschylus' Seven Against Thebes, deals with the battle at Thebes. We hear, for the first time, of an agreement between Polynices and Eteocles to rule Thebes in alternate years. In the prologue we are told that Oedipus had cursed his sons to "divide this house with the whetted sword", and that, in fear of this, they agreed that Polynices, as the younger brother, would leave Thebes, and that Eteocles would rule Thebes in the first year. But after the year was up, Eteocles refused to relinquish the throne. Polynices tells his mother an account of how, exiled from Thebes, he went to Argos and married Adrastus' daughter. He tells the same story already told in The Suppliants, coming to Argos late at night, fighting Tydeus, Adrastus giving them his daughters because of Apollo's oracle to marry his daughters "To lion and to boar", and Adrastus' promise to bring his new son-in-laws back from exile, starting with Polynices.

Euripides gives the same list of seven champions as he did in The Suppliants, and as Aeschylus did, with the exception that here Euripides counts Adrastus as being one of the Seven, in place of Eteocles. And, like Aeschylus, he pairs each of the Seven with a gate. Five of the gate names are the same: Homoloïd, Electran, Neïstan, Proetid and Seventh, and one of the pairings: Capaneus at the Electran Gate. Otherwise Euripides has Tydeus at the Homoloïd Gate, Hippomedon at the Ogygian Gate, Parthenopaeus at the Neïstan Gate, Amphiaraus at the Proetid Gate, Polynices at the Crenaean (i.e. Fountain) Gate, and Adrastus at the Seventh Gate.

Eteocles chooses seven Theban captains (unnamed), to oppose the Seven champions at the seven Theban gates. The Theban seer Tiresias prophesizes that the city can be saved only if Creon's son Menoeceus is killed. As Tiresias explains, in retribution for the killing of Ares' dragon, by Cadmus, the founder of Thebes, in order to appease Ares and propitiate Earth, a descendant of the Spartoi must be killed in the same place that the dragon was killed. Since only Menoeceus satisfies the proper conditions, he stabs himself on top of the city walls above where the dragon was killed, so that as his body falls it lands on that spot.

During the battle, Parthenopaeus is killed by Periclymenus. Capaneus, boasting that not even Zeus could stop him, is killed by Zeus' thunderbolt, and Adrastus, seeing that "Zeus was his army's enemy", withdraws his forces. Then Eteocles offers to fight Polynices in single combat, with the winner ruling Thebes. The offer is accepted by Polynices, and both armies swear to abide by its terms. The two brothers fight a duel, and kill each other. Since the two armies cannot agree on who won the duel, the battle resumes, and the Thebans are victorious.

==== Hypsipyle ====
Euripides' partially preserved play Hypsipyle (c. 411–407 BC), dramatized the Seven's stop at Nemea, and the death of the infant Opheltes. This play is the earliest source to involve Hypsipyle in Opheltes' story, which may well have been a Euripidean invention. Here Hypsipyle, the former queen of Lemnos and lover of Jason, has come to be a slave, and nursemaid of the infant Opheltes, who is the son of Lycurgus, the priest of Zeus at Nemea, and his wife Eurydice.

The Seven, having just arrived at Nemea, encounter Hypsipyle. Amphiaraus tells her that they need water for a sacrifice, and she leads the Seven to a spring. Hypsipyle brings Opheltes with her, and somehow, in a moment of neglect, Opheltes is killed by a serpent. Eurydice is about to have Hypsipyle put to death, when Amphiaraus arrives, tells Euridice that the child's death was destined, and proposes that funeral games be held in Opheltes' honor. Amphiaraus is able to convince Euridice to spare Hypsipyle's life, and the games are held.

==== Oedipus at Colonus ====
Only the anticipation of the Seven's war at Thebes is dealt with in Sophocles' Oedipus at Colonus (401 BC). Polynices (who here is the older brother) says that he was driven into exile by Eteocles, as in Pherecydes.

Sophocles gives the same list of Seven as given in Aeschylus' Seven Against Thebes, and Euripides' The Suppliants: Tydeus, Capaneus, Eteoclus, Hippomedon, Parthenopaeus, Amphiaraus and Polynices. Eteoclus is said to be Argive, and Hippomedon is said to be the son of Talaus, and thus the brother of Adrastus.

==== Asclepiades ====
Likely drawing upon lost fifth-century BC tragedies by Aeschylus and Sophocles, the fourth-century BC literary critic Asclepiades (as reported by Odyssey scholia) tells the story of Amphiaraus's betrayal by his wife Eriphyle. According to Asclepiades, after some quarrel between Amphiaraus and Adrastus, the two men swore an oath that, for any future disagreements, the two men would be ruled by Amphiaraus's wife and Adrastus's sister, Eriphyle. When the expedition against Thebes was being assembled, Amphiaraus argued against it, and prophesied the disaster to come. However Eriphyle, having received from Polynices the necklace of Harmonia, forced Amphiaraus to join the expedition.

=== Late sources ===
The Greek historian Diodorus Siculus (first century BC), the Latin poet Statius (first century AD), the Greek mythographer Apollodorus (first or second century AD), and the Roman mythographer Hyginus, author of the Fabulae (second century AD?), all gave accounts of the story of the Seven against Thebes. Each of these accounts is more or less complete, and consistent with earlier accounts. But there are a few differences, and several additional details.

==== Diodorus Siculus ====
Diodorus Siculus, following Euripides, says that Polynices and Eteocles agreed to rule in alternate years. Being the oldest, Eteocles ruled the first year, after which he refused to give up the throne, and Polynices fled to Argos. There he married Adrastus' daughter Argia and Adrastus promised to restore Polynices to the Theban throne.

In Diodorus' account—unlike in Homer—Tydeus' embassy and ambush occurs before the army is assembled. Tydeus travels from Argos to Thebes and back, and somewhere along the way is ambushed by fifty Thebans. Upon learning of the failure of Tydeus' mission, Adrastus begins organizing an expedition against Thebes.

Diodorus gives a more complete version of Amphiaraus' betrayal by his wife Eriphyle, consistent with the passing mentions in Homer and Pindar, and the account attributed to Asclepiades. Amphiaraus had foreseen his death, and because of this would not join Adrastus in his expedition against Thebes. But the two men agreed to let Eriphyle decide the issue, and because Polynices had given Eriphyle the golden necklace of Harmonia, she decides that the expedition should be undertaken, and that Amphiaraus should take part.

Adrastus recruits Capaneus, Hippomedon and Parthenopaeus, the son of Atalanta, to join himself, Polynices, Tydeus, and Amphiaraus as the seven leaders of the "notable army", the same list of Seven as in The Phoenician Women. Omitting any mention of the Seven's stop at Nemea, Diodorus moves directly to the battle at Thebes. As always, Polynices and Eteocles kill each other, Capaneus dies while "impetuously ascending the wall by a scaling-ladder" (with no mention of a thunderbolt), the earth swallows Amphiaraus and his chariot, and all the rest of the Seven die, except Adrastus. As for the burial of the Seven, Diodorus (with no mention of Creon, Antigone or Theseus) says that the Thebans refused to allow Adrastus to remove the dead, so he goes home to Argos, and (as in Euripides' The Suppliants) the Athenians recover the bodies and bury them.

==== Hyginus ====
In his Fabulae, Hyginus gives an account of the story, mostly in accord with earlier sources (67–74). Just as Diodorus does, Hyginus lists the same Seven as in The Phoenician Women: Adrastus, Polynices, Tydeus, Amphiaraus, Capaneus, Hippomedon, and Parthenopaeus. He adds that Capaneus and Hippomedon are the sons of sisters of Adrastus (70) (this is a different parentage for Hippomedon than in Oedipus at Colonus where he is the son of Taulus). The army stops at Nemea in search of water, Opheltes is killed by a snake, and the Seven establish funeral games in the child's honor (74). At Thebes, an impious Capaneus is struck down by a Jovian thunderbolt while scaling the city walls, the earth swallows Amphiaraus, Polynices and Eteocles kill each other (68), and all the rest die except Adrastus (70).

Hyginus gives a different account of Antigone's fate than in Sophocles' Antigone, possibly following Euripides' lost tragedy Antigone. Creon forbids burial of the Seven, including Polynices, but Antigone, and Argia, Polynices wife, burn his corpse on Eteocles' funeral-pyre. They are caught, Argia escapes, and although Antigone is initially saved by Creon's son Haemon, she is eventually killed (72).

==== Statius ====
Just as the Cyclic Thebaid had been, the Latin poet Statius's Thebaid (c. 92 AD), is devoted entirely to the story of the Seven against Thebes. An epic poem in 12 books, it begins with Oedipus cursing his sons Polynices and Eteocles, who he says have mistreated him (1.56–87). The brothers having agreed to rule Thebes in alternate years (1.138–139), Eteocles occupies the Theban throne, while Polynices is in exile for a year (1.164–165). One night during a raging storm, Polynices and Tydeus arrive at Adrastus' palace in Argos seeking refuge. They quarrel over the same bit of shelter, a fight breaks out, Adrastus is awoken, and separates them. He invites the two inside, and notices that Polynices wears a lion's pelt and that Tydeus a boar's skin and tusks, and by these signs, Adrastus recognizes in Polynices and Tydeus, the husbands that had been prophesied for his two daughters (1.401–512). The next day Polynices and Tydeus accept Adrastus' offer of his daughters Argia and Deipyle in marriage, and Adrastus promises to help the two regain their native kingdoms (2.152–200).

Statius devotes most of Book 2 to Tydeus' embassy to Thebes. As in Diodorus' account, this occurs before the Argive army has been assembled. Polynices, Tydesus and Adrastus agree that someone should be sent to Thebes to see if Eteocles will peacefully surrender the throne, and Tydeus volunteers. At Thebes, Tydeus engages in a long confrontation with Eteocles, who rejects Tydeus' arguments that, since his year of rule is over, he should give over the kingship to Polynices (2.363–451). On his way back to Argos, Tydeus is ambushed by fifty Thebans, but kills all of these but Maeon (2.482–703).

In Book 3, on returning to Argos, Tydeus urges an immediate attack of Thebes (3.324–364). Adrastus consults the seers Amphiaraus and Melampus who receive ill omens (3.440–551). The Argive people demand war (3.575–597). Amphiaraus is forced to reveal what he has foreseen: death and defeat at Thebes (3.618–3.647). Argia now Polynices' wife, tearfully urges her father Adrastus to make war on Thebes, who begins assembling an army (3.678–721).

In Book 4 the expedition sets out from Argos. Statius' Seven champions are the same as in The Phoenician Women, Diodorus, and Hyginus: Adrastus, Polynices, Tydeus, Hippomedon, Capaneus, Amphiaraus, and Parthenopaeus (4.32–250). Bacchus, wishing to delay the Seven, causes a drought, and the Seven, in desperate need of water, are forced to stop at Nemea (4.646–745).

Statius devotes the rest of Book 4, through the end of Book 6, to the Death of Opheltes. At Nemea the Seven encounter Hypsipyle the nurse of Opheltes, the infant son of Lycurgus the king of Nemea. While Hypsipyle leads the Seven to a spring, Opheltes is killed by a monstrous serpent. The Seven kill the serpent and save Hypsipyle from being put to death by Lycurgus. They hold funeral games in Opheltes' honor, which will become the Nemean Games.

In Book 7, the expedition arrives at Thebes, the fighting begins, and continues through Book 11. The earth swallows up Amphiaraus and his chariot (7.794–823). Tydeus is fatally wounded by Melanippus, but is brought Melanippus' severed head and Tydeus eats Melanippus' brains (8.716–766). Hippomedon, nearly drowned by the flooding river Ismenus, is killed by a "shower" of Theban spears (9.522–539). Parthenopaeus is killed by Dryas (9.841–849). In response to a prophecy of the seer Tiresias, in order to save Thebes, Menoeceus sacrifices himself by leaping from the city walls (10.756–782). Capaneus climbs a tower and is killed by a Jovian thunderbolt (10.837–939). Polynices challenges Eteocles to single combat (11.239–249), Eteocles accepts (11.389–395) and the brothers kill each other (11.403–573).

In Book 12, Creon forbids the burial of Polynices and the Argive dead (12.94–103). Both searching the battlefield for Polynices, his wife Argia and his sister Antigone meet by chance over his dead body (12.362–408). They burn his corpse on Eteocles' funeral pyre, and are arrested (12.429–463). They are about to be executed when Theseus arrives threatening war (12.677–686). A battle ensues, Theseus kills Creon in single combat, enters the city as victor, and the bodies of the fallen warriors are burned and buried (12.720–809).

==== Apollodorus ====
According to Apollodorus, Polynices and Eteocles agreed to rule Thebes in alternate years. He adds that while some say Eteocles ruled first, others say Polynices had the first year, after which he handed over the throne to Eteocles. However, in either case Eteocles refused to hand over the kingdom to Polynices. Exiled, Polynices took with him the necklace and robe of Harmonia and fled to Argos.

Like Asclepiades and Diodorus, Apollodorus says that Polynices bribed Amphiaraus' wife Eriphyle with the necklace, forcing Amphiaraus to go to war. Apollodorus (agreeing with The Phoenician Women, Diodorus, Hyginus, and Statius) lists the Seven champions as: Adrastus, Amphiaraus, Capaneus, Hippomedon, Polynices, Tydeus, and Parthenopaeus. However he adds that "some" do not count Tydeus and Polynices among the Seven, but include Eteoclus, son of Iphis, and Mecisteus, a son of Talaus and brother of Adrastus. Although in Oedipus at Colonus, Hippomedon is the son of Talaus (and so a brother of Adrastus), and in Hyginus he was the son of a sister of Adrastus, according to Apollodorus, Hippomedon was the son of Aristomachus, another brother of Adrastus. Apollodorus notes however that "some" said Hippomedon was the son of Talaus.

At funeral games for Opheltes held at Nemea he says that:

Adrastus won the horse race, Eteoclus the footrace, Tydeus the boxing match, Amphiaraus the leaping and quoit-throwing match, Laodocus the javelin-throwing match, Polynices the wrestling match, and Parthenopaeus the archery match.

As in Homer, when the army had arrived just south of Thebes, Tydeus is sent on his embassy to Thebes and on his way back he is ambushed by fifty Thebans, and kills all but Maeon. At Thebes (as in Seven Against Thebes and The Phoenician Women) each of the Seven is assigned one of the seven gates of Thebes:

Adrastus was stationed at the Homoloidian gate, Capaneus at the Ogygian, Amphiaraus at the Proetidian, Hippomedon at the Oncaidian, Polynices at the Hypsistan, Parthenopaeus at the Electran, and Tydeus at the Crenidian.

As in The Phoenician Women and Statius' Thebaid, in response to Tiresias' prophecy, Menoeceus sacrifices himself before the gates. Meanwhile, a battle having occurred outside the city gates, the Thebans have been driven back to their walls. Capaneus begins scaling them, but is struck down by Zeus, causing the Argive army to flee. Polynices and Eteocles fight a duel for the kingship and kill each other. Hippomedon is killed by Ismarus, Eteoclus is killed by Leades, Parthenopaeus is killed by Amphidicus (which, as Apollodorus points out, is different than what Euripides said, that Parthenopaeus was killed by Periclymenus).

Tydeus is mortally wounded by Melanippus in the belly. Athena brought Tydeus a potion by which she intended to make him immortal. But Amphiaraus, who hated Tydeus for having instigated the war, perceived Athena's intention. So he cut off Melanippus' head, and gave it to Tydeus, who cut it open and ate the brains. This so disgusted Athena that she withheld the potion, as Amphiaraus intended. Although Melanippus is usually said to have been killed by Amphiaraus, a possible interpolation in Apollodorus' text says that, the wounded Tydeus managed to kill Melanippus himself.

Amphiaraus then fled the battlefield, and when he was about to be killed by Periclymenus' spear in the back, Zeus opened the earth. He was swallowed up, along with his chariot and charioteer (either Baton or Elato), and Zeus made him immortal. Because of his horse Arion, Adrastus is, as always, the only champion saved.

Apollodorus follows Sophocles' Antigone in his account of Antigone's heroism and death (without mentioning Haemon). And for the most part follows Euripides' The Suppliants in his account of the recovery and burial of the dead: Adrastus fled to Athens, as a suppliant at the altar of Mercy sought the Athenian's aid, Theseus marched on Thebes, captured the city and recovered the dead, and Evadne jumped on her husband's burning pyre.
