= William Thalmann =

American classical scholar (born 1947)

William Gregory Thalmann
- Born: 1947 (age 78–79)
- Occupations: Professor Emeritus of Classics and Comparative Literature

Academic background
- Education: Amherst College (BA); Yale University (PhD)

Academic work
- Discipline: Classics
- Sub-discipline: Ancient Greek literature

William Gregory Thalmann (born 1947) is an American classical scholar, known for his work on ancient Greek literature from the archaic to the Hellenistic period.

== Biography ==
Thalmann was born in 1947. He was educated at Amherst College, graduating BA in 1969, and then at Yale University, obtaining his PhD in 1975, with a thesis titled "The Seven Against Thebes of Aeschylus: A Study in Dramatic Technique".

He then served as an assistant and associate professor of Classics at Yale University from 1975 to 1984, and as an associate professor of Classics at Hobart and William Smith Colleges from 1984 to 1987. He then moved to the University of Southern California, serving as Professor of Classics from 1987 to 2001 and as a Professor of Classics and Comparative Literature from 2001 onwards. He is now Professor Emeritus of Classics and Comparative Literature.

== Selected publications ==
- Thalmann, William G. (1978). Dramatic Art in Aeschylus's Seven Against Thebes. Yale University Press. ISBN 9780300022193.
- Thalmann, William G. (1984). Conventions of Form and Thought in Early Greek Epic Poetry. Johns Hopkins University Press. ISBN 9780801831959.
- Thalmann, William G. (1992). The Odyssey: An Epic of Return. Twayne. ISBN 9780805785647.
- Thalmann, William G. (1998). The Swineherd and the Bow: Representations of Class in the Odyssey. Cornell University Press. ISBN 9780801434792.
- Thalmann, William G. (2011). Apollonius of Rhodes and the Spaces of Hellenism. Oxford University Press. ISBN 9780199731572.
- Thalmann, William G. (2023). Theocritus: Space, Absence, and Desire. Oxford University Press. ISBN 9780197636558.
