= Eteoclus =

In Greek mythology, Eteoclus (Ancient Greek: Ἐτέοκλος) was the son of Iphis.

== Mythology ==
Eteoclus participated in the war on Thebes by the Seven against Thebes, and was occasionally included on the list of the seven leaders. In Euripides' Suppliant Women, Adrastus describes him as a young, poor yet dignified person who would reject luxurious gifts from friends and was highly honored by fellow Argives.

In Aeschylus' play Seven Against Thebes, Eteoclus is one of the seven champions who attack Thebes' seven gates. He attacks the Neistan gates, carrying a shield which displays a man scaling a tower with a ladder, on which shield it is written that not even Ares could cast him down. He is confronted by Megareus. However, in the Phoenician Women, Adrastus is named as the assailant of the seventh gate of Thebes and Eteoclus is not mentioned. Other authors, among them Diodorus, Statius, and Hyginus, do not mention Eteoclus either.

Eteoclus was said to have been killed by Leades, a son of Astacus. His son Medon was sometimes mentioned as one of the Epigoni.
