= Supplices =

Supplices, the plural of Latin supplex "suppliant," may refer to either of two ancient Greek plays:

- The Suppliants, by Euripides
- The Suppliants, by Aeschylus
