= Astynome =

Several Greek mythological characters

Astynome (Ancient Greek: Ἀστυνόμη, romanized: Astynóme) is a name which may refer to one of the following characters in Greek mythology:

- Astynome, one of the Niobids.
- Astynome, daughter of Talaus and mother of Capaneus by Hipponous.
- Astynome, commonly referred to by the patronymic Chryseis.
- Astynome, mother by Ares of Calydon who saw Artemis naked and was transformed into a rock by the goddess.
