= Calydon (son of Ares) =

Greek mythological figure

In Greek mythology, Calydon (/ˈkælɪdɒn/; Ancient Greek: Καλυδών, romanized: Kaludṓn) is a minor figure from the homonymous region of Calydon, the son of Ares and Astynome. Calydon angered the goddess Artemis when he saw her naked, and was then turned into rock as punishment.

== Family ==
Calydon was born to Ares, the god of war, and a mortal woman named Astynome. Like his name indicates, he was from Calydon, an ancient city in Aetolia, in western Greece.

== Mythology ==
One day, Calydon accidentally came upon the virgin goddess Artemis who was bathing naked. As punishment she turned him into rock, and thus the mountain Gyrus that lay by the Achelous river took his name and was thus called Calydon thereafter.

== Interpretation ==
Calydon seeing the goddess naked constitutes an intrusion which is sexual in nature, putting him in the same class as other rapists; blinding is a common punishment for sexual crimes in Greek mythology.

Calydon's story is only preserved in Pseudo-Plutarch's Treatise on Rivers and Mountains (or De fluviis), a work by an author now known not to have been the actual Plutarch. This second-century work is today classified as paradoxography or a parody of paradoxography, and might have been written with a humorous, non-serious tone.

== See also ==
- Tiresias
- Siproites
- Actaeon

== Bibliography ==
- Grimal, Pierre (1987). The Dictionary of Classical Mythology. Wiley-Blackwell. ISBN 0-631-13209-0.
- Forbes Irving, Paul M. C. (1990). Metamorphosis in Greek Myths. Oxford Classical Monographs. Oxford, New York, Toronto: Oxford University Press, Clarendon Press. ISBN 0-19-814730-9.
- Pseudo-Plutarch (1878). Brady Kiesling (ed.). Names of Rivers and Mountains, in Plutarch, The Moralia. Translated by William Watson Goodwin.
- Roscher, Wilhelm Heinrich (1894). Ausführliches Lexikon der griechischen und römischen Mythologie [Detailed dictionary of Greek and Roman mythology] (in German). Vol. II: IACHE-KYZIKOS. Leipzig: Teubner-Verlag.
