= Astacus (mythology) =

Various Greek mythologicial figures

In Greek mythology, the name Astacus (Ancient Greek: Ἄστακος) may refer to:

- Astacus of Thebes, a descendant of the Spartoi, and the eponym of the city Astacus, characterized as "a noble and proud man". One of his sons, Melanippus, was one of the principal defenders of Thebes in the war of the Seven against Thebes and fell against Tydeus. His other three sons, Ismarus, Leades, and Amphidicus (or Asphodicus), were credited with killing Hippomedon, Eteoclus and Parthenopaeus respectively. Yet other two sons of his, Erithelas and Lobes, were said to have founded Hypoplacian Thebes.
- Astacus, a son of Poseidon and the nymph Olbia, eponymous founder of Astacus, Bithynia.
- Astacus, a son of Hermes and (?) Astabe, a daughter of Peneus; he was father of Iocles (or Oicles?) and through him grandfather of Hipponous.
