= Eurydice (wife of Creon) =

Character in Greek mythology

In Greek mythology, Eurydice (/jʊəˈrɪdɪsi/; Ancient Greek: Εὐρυδίκη, Eὐrudíkē "wide justice", derived from ευρυς eurys "wide" and δικη dike "justice") sometimes called Henioche, was the wife of Creon, a king of Thebes.

== Family ==
Eurydice was probably the mother of Creon's five children: Menoeceus (Megareus), Lycomedes, Haemon, Megara and Pyrrha. She was considered to be a loving mother, but after the death of her son Haemon, she slowly turned to solitude, ultimately plunged a dagger into her heart.

== Mythology ==
=== Sophocles' account ===
She appears briefly in Sophocles' Antigone (as an "archetypal grieving, saddened mother" and an older counterpart to Antigone). Eurydice kills herself after a messenger tells her that her son Haemon and his betrothed, Antigone, have both killed themselves in protest of Antigone's unjust imprisonment by Haemon's father Creon. She thrusts a sword into her liver and curses Creon for the death of her two sons.

=== Statius' account ===
The seer Tiresias predicts that if a son of Creon voluntarily throws himself off the wall, the city will be saved. Then Menoeceus decided to sacrifice himself and jumped off the wall. When his dead body was carried on the shoulders by a few people, Eurydice bursts through town in a wail of:

'Was it then to make atonement and devote thy life for cruel Thebes that I nourished thee, illustrious boy, as though I were some worthless mother? What crime then had I wrought, what god so hated me? No incestuous offspring have I borne in unnatural intercourse, nor given unhallowed progeny to my own son. What matters that? Jocasta hath her sons, and sees them leaders and kings: but we must make cruel expiation for the war, that the brothers, sons of Oedipus, may exchange their diadems—doth this please thee, O author of the blow? But why complain I of men and gods? Thou, cruel Menoeceus, thou before all didst haste to slay thy unhappy mother! Whence came this love of death? What cursed madness seized thy mind? What did I conceive, what misbegotten child did I bear, so different from myself? Verily 'tis the snake of Mars Ares, and the ground that burgeoned fresh with our armed sires—thence comes that desperate valour, that overmastering love of war: nought comes of his mother. Lo! of thine own will and pleasure slain, ay, even against the will of Fate, thou forcest an entrance to the gloomy shades. I was fearing the Danaan and the shafts of Capaneus: 'twas this hand, this hand of thine I should have feared, and the sword I myself once gave thee in my folly. See how the glade is wholly buried in his throat! None of the Danaan could have made a deeper thurst.' That is how Eurydice keeps complaining and complaining.

Eventually, she was led away by friendly hands to the palace. The lamentation, however, was getting worse, so her companions and servants were forced to lock Eurydice into her room. There, she ploughed her face with her nails, pulled her hair out of her head and continued to mourn for months. In the end, she lost her voice, no longer looked towards the light, did not listen to supplications and lost her mind.
