= The Suppliants (Euripides) =

Play by Euripides

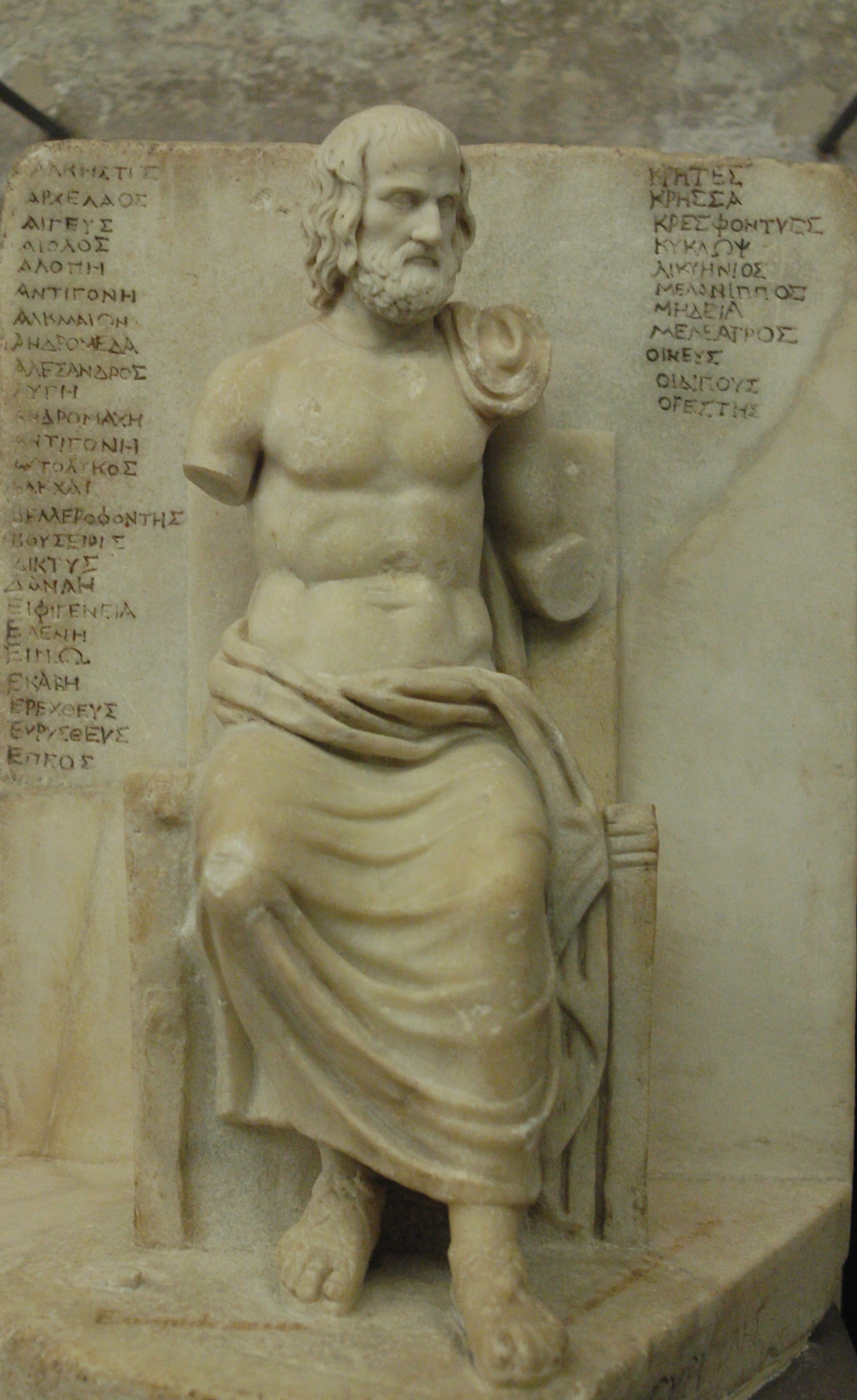
- Statue of Euripides
- Original language: Ancient Greek
- Written by: Euripides
- Chorus: 1. Mothers of the Seven (and attendants?); 2. Sons of the Seven
- Characters: Aethra; Theseus; Adrastus; Herald of Creon Messenger; Evadne; Iphis; Athena
- Genre: Tragedy
- Setting: Before the temple of Demeter at Eleusis

Premiere
- Date: 423 BC
- Place: Athens

The Suppliants (Ancient Greek: Ἱκέτιδες, Hiketides; Latin Supplices), also called The Suppliant Women, first performed in 423 BC, is an ancient Greek play by Euripides.

== Background ==
After Oedipus leaves Thebes, his sons fight for control of it. Polynices lays siege to Thebes against his brother Eteocles. Polynices has married the daughter of Adrastus, King of Argos. And so Polynices has on his side the Argive army, leaders of which are the Seven against Thebes. The invaders lose the battle, and Polynices and Eteocles both die. Creon takes power in Thebes and decrees the invaders are not to be buried. The mothers of the dead seek someone to help reverse this, so their sons can be buried.

The population of Plataea came to Athens as suppliants after the destruction of their city in 427 BC, a few years before the performance of this play. They were allowed to stay in Athens and, exceptionally, they were granted Athenian citizenship. This event may have influenced the play and its reception.

== Story ==
Aethra, the mother of the Athenian king Theseus, prays before the altar of Demeter and Persephone in Eleusis. She is surrounded by women from Argos whose sons died in battle outside the gates of Thebes. Because of Creon’s decree, their corpses remain unburied. Adrastus, the king of Argos who authorized the expedition, lies weeping on the floor surrounded by the sons of the slain warriors. Aethra has sent a messenger to Theseus asking him to come to Eleusis.

The old women beg Aethra for help, evoking images of their sons’ unburied bodies and appealing to her sympathy as a mother. Theseus arrives. When he asks his mother what is going on, she directs him to Adrastus who begs him to reclaim the bodies. Adrastus explains that he supported the attack on Thebes, against the advice of the seer Amphiaraus, in deference to his sons-in-law, Tydeus and Polynices. Theseus observes that he favoured courage over discretion. Admitting his mistakes, Adrastus appeals to Theseus as the ruler of the only city with the integrity and the power to stand up to Thebes.

After a bit of reflection on the state of mankind, Theseus resolves not to repeat Adrastus’ mistake. He tells Adrastus to go away and leave him alone. Although Adrastus is ready to concede, the women will not take no for an answer. Appealing to principles of common human decency, they beg Aethra to intervene. She reminds her son that he has a duty to uphold the ancient laws of Hellas and warns him that his refusal might be interpreted as cowardice. Moved by her tears and arguments, Theseus agrees to intervene, but only if the Athenian citizens endorse his decision. Confident that the people will support him, he and his mother set out for home, followed by Adrastus and the sons of the slain warriors, while the suppliant women pray that Theseus will prevail.

Some time later Theseus returns with a retinue. He dispatches his herald to Thebes to request the release of the bodies. If they cooperate, he says, thank them and come back. If they refuse, tell them Theseus will be in arms at their gates with the full backing of the Athenian people. Before the herald can leave, however, a herald from Thebes arrives looking for the local despot. When Theseus tells him that Athens is not ruled by a despot, but by the people, the herald adopts a disparaging tone. His city, he tells Theseus, is ruled by one man, not by an ignorant mob that is easily swayed by specious words. Theseus responds by saying that in a democracy every man can make a contribution if what he says is wise. The herald warns Theseus not to succumb to the patriotic fervor of the populace. "If death were before their eyes when they were giving their votes," he says, “Hellas would never rush to her doom in mad desire for battle."

Theseus reminds the herald that he does not take orders from Creon and asserts his right to uphold the ancient customs of Hellas regarding the recovery of the corpses. When the herald warns him against meddling in something that does not concern him, Theseus states his resolve to do what is right and holy. The herald taunts him to bring it on, while Theseus tells his army to prepare for the attack. He will lead the way with a sword in his hand and the gods at his side. The herald leaves for Thebes with Theseus and his men in close pursuit. They pointedly leave Adrastus behind so as not to confuse their current mission with the previous invasion.

As the men depart, the women express their fears of additional violence. They hope a compromise can be reached but offer prayers for victory just in case it cannot.

A messenger — a former servant of Capaneus who had been captured by the Thebans — arrives to announce the Athenian victory. After describing how Theseus forced the Theban army to retreat into the city, he reports that Theseus restrained his men at the gates, telling them that they had come to rescue the bodies, not to sack the city. This is the kind of leader men should choose, the messenger says, one who shows courage in danger, but does not overreach. His sentiments are echoed by Adrastus who questions why men choose war instead of settling their disputes with reason.

The messenger describes how Theseus himself washed the corpses and prepared them for burial. The women are pleased that the bodies have been recovered, but distressed at the thought of seeing them. It would have been better had they never married, they say.

When Theseus arrives with the corpses, Adrastus engages the women in a loud lament. At Theseus’ suggestion, Adrastus delivers a funeral oration in which he offers the fallen warriors as models for the Athenian youth to emulate. He describes Capaneus, for example, as a paragon of moderation and Eteoclus as a man of such high honour that he spurned offers of gold to avoid corrupting his character.

Theseus refuses to allow the women to see the mangled and decaying bodies of their sons, but says that they will receive their ashes. All will be burned in a common pyre except Capaneus who, because he was struck down by Zeus, will have a special tomb.

The women continue their lament (“like some wandering cloud I drift”; “I have nothing left but tears.”) Suddenly, they spot Capaneus’ wife Evadne in her bridal dress climbing the rocks above her husband’s sepulcher. Recalling her wedding day, she announces her plan to join her husband in the flames of the pyre. Her father Iphis tries to talk her down, but she leaps to her death eliciting gasps from the onlookers and a cry of woe from her father.

As Iphis leaves, the orphaned youths arrive to hand over the ashes of their fathers to their grandmothers. The boys’ lamentations are laced with promises of vengeance. As he prepares to leave, Theseus reminds the Argives of their debt to Athens — which they gratefully acknowledge. Their gratitude, however, is not enough for Athena. She suddenly appears above the temple to instruct Theseus to extract a pledge from Adrastus never to invade Athens. After enjoining Theseus to memorialize the pledge at the temple of Apollo, she tells the young men that they will grow up to avenge the death of their fathers by sacking Thebes. Adrastus and the women depart, grateful for the assistance they have received from Theseus.

The same story had been mentioned years earlier in book 9.27 of The History by Herodotus, in which the Athenians claimed the event as an example of their history of bravery.

== Unburied dead ==
In ancient Greek literature, funeral rites are highly important to the citizenry. The Iliad contains scenes of fighters in violent conflict over the treatment of corpses, such as that of Patroclus. People are often willing to fight and risk dying to obtain the bodies of the dead. The Suppliants takes this characteristic even further, showing a whole city willing to wage war in order to retrieve the bodies of strangers. The theme of forbidding dead bodies from burial occurs many times throughout ancient Greek literature. Examples include the body of Hector as portrayed in the Iliad, the body of Ajax as portrayed in Sophocles' Ajax, and the children of Niobe. For what happens to the body of Polynices, see Sophocles' Antigone.

== Translations ==
- Robert Potter, 1781 - verse: full text
- Edward P. Coleridge, 1891 - prose: full text on Wikisource
- Arthur S. Way, 1912 - verse
- Frank William Jones, 1958 - verse: available for digital loan
- Rosanna Warren and Stephen Scully, 1995 - verse
- George Theodoridis, 2010 - prose: full text
