= Haemon =

Mythical character

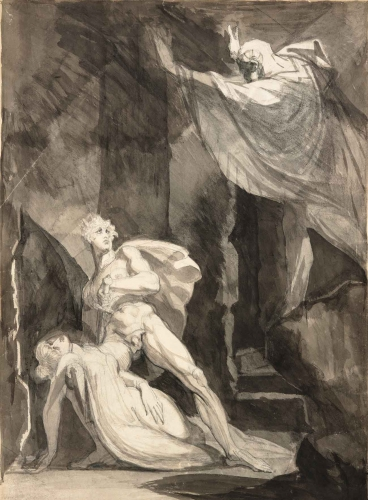
Haemon Discovering the Body of Antigone by Henry Fuseli, 1800 gray-brown wash over graphite.

In Greek mythology, Haemon (/ˈhiːmɒn/; Ancient Greek: Αἵμων; gen.: Αἵμωνος, romanized: Haímōn, lit. 'bloody') was the son of Creon and Eurydice, and thus brother of Menoeceus (Megareus), Lycomedes, Megara, Pyrrha and Henioche. The various sources of his myth present differing and contradictory versions of his story.

== Mythology ==
In the version of the myth recorded by Apollodorus and in the Oedipodea, Haemon was killed by the Sphinx. In Sophocles' Antigone, Haemon was the fiancé of Antigone and killed himself after her death. In Euripides' Antigone, Haemon marries Antigone and they have a son, Maeon; in his Phoenician Women Antigone declares that she will kill Haemon and the engagement is broken. In a version of the myth recorded by Hyginus, Haemon and Antigone have a son but he is murdered by Creon, following which Haemon kills both Antigone and himself.

== See also ==
- Epigoni
