= Megareus (son of Creon) =

Warrior of Thebes in Greek mythology

In Greek mythology, Megareus (/ˌmɛɡəˈreɪəs/; Ancient Greek: Μεγαρέας) or Menoeceus (Μενοικεύς) was a warrior of Thebes, who figures in the war of the Seven against Thebes – the struggle between Eteocles and Polynices, the twin sons of Oedipus, for the throne of Thebes. He was known for his large stature, and is considered an anthropomorphic representation of his father's pride by some literary scholars.

== Family ==
Megareus was the son of Eurydice and Creon, uncle of the two princes. He was thus the brother of Lycomedes, Haemon, Megara, Pyrrha, and Henioche, and the cousin of Antigone, Ismene, Eteocles, and Polynices.

== Mythology ==
Creon supported Eteocles, the incumbent king. Megareus wanted to fight for Eteocles, but Creon did not want him to, fearing for his safety. Also, Tiresias, the blind prophet, told Creon that Eteocles would win if Creon sacrificed Megareus, reinforcing his decision. Creon suppressed Tiresias' prophecy, and sent Megareus to be sheltered away from the city of Thebes.

Despite this, Megareus joined the battle because he didn't want to be thought a coward. Overconfident and inexperienced, he was killed in the first clash. He is mentioned in Aeschylus's play Seven Against Thebes, where he is matched against Eteoclus at the gate of Neïs.

He is also mentioned in Sophocles' play Antigone. His mother, Eurydice of Thebes, kills herself after learning that her son Haemon and his betrothed, Antigone, had both committed suicide. She thrusts a sword into her heart and curses Creon for the death of her two sons: Haemon and Megareus. He is also called Menoeceus in some versions of Antigone.
