= Seven Against Thebes (play) =

Ancient Greek tragedy by Aeschylus

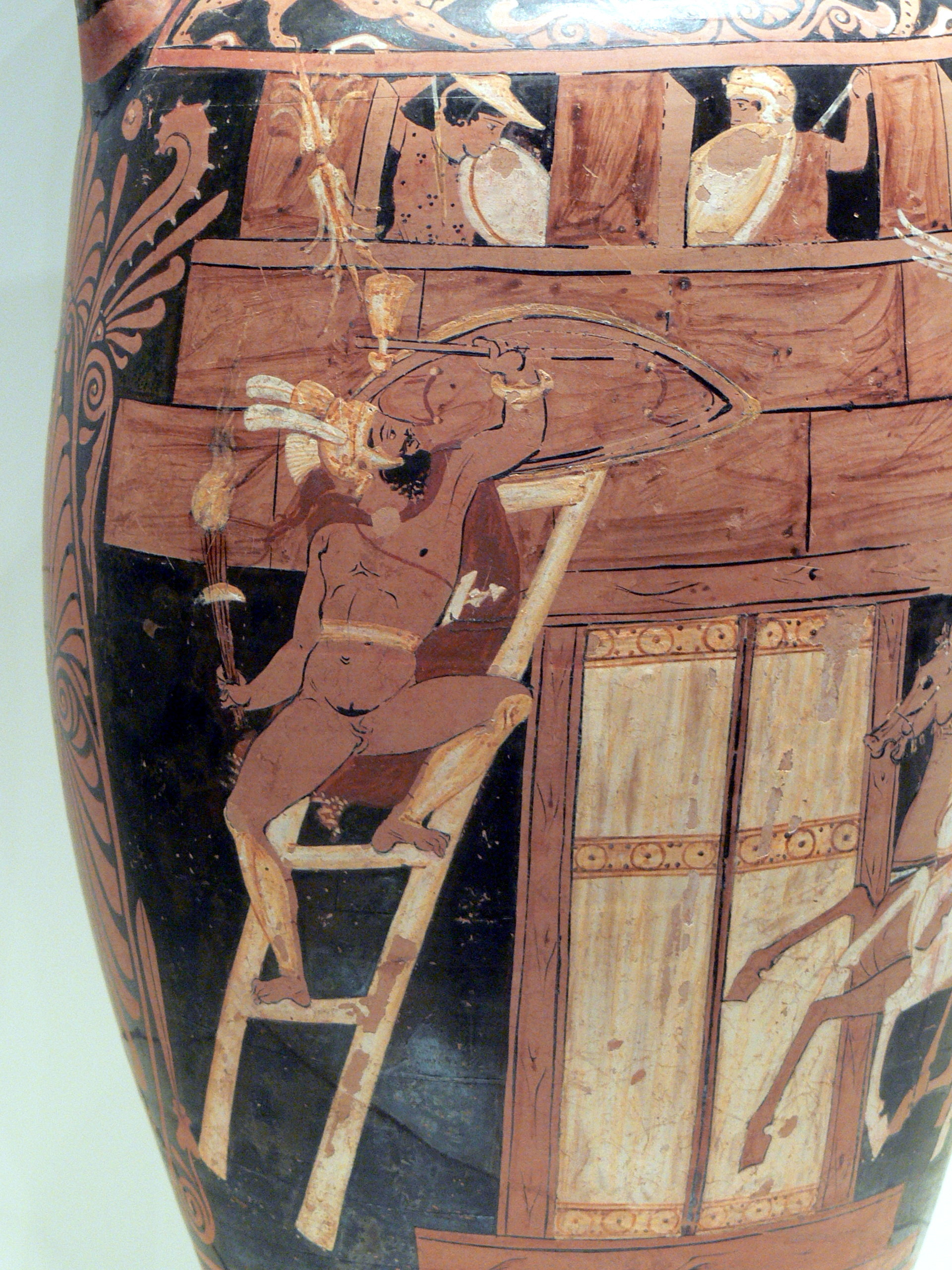
- Capaneus scales the city wall of Thebes, Campanian red-figure Neck-amphora attributed to the Caivano Painter, ca. 340 BC, J. Paul Getty Museum (92.AE.86).
- Written by: Aeschylus
- Chorus: Theban Women
- Characters: Eteocles; Antigone; Ismene; Messenger; Herald
- Setting: Citadel of Thebes

Seven Against Thebes (Ancient Greek: Ἑπτὰ ἐπὶ Θήβας, Hepta epi Thēbas; Latin: Septem contra Thebas) is the third play in an Oedipus-themed trilogy produced by Aeschylus in 467 BC. The trilogy is sometimes referred to as the Oedipodea. It concerns the battle between an Argive army, led by seven champions including Polynices who were called the Seven against Thebes, and the army of Thebes led by Eteocles and his supporters. The trilogy won the first prize at the Athens City Dionysia. The trilogy's first two plays, Laius and Oedipus, as well as the satyr play Sphinx, are no longer extant.

== Background ==
When Oedipus, King of Thebes, realized he had married his own mother and had two sons and two daughters with her, he blinded himself and cursed his sons to divide their inheritance (the kingdom) by the sword. The two sons, Eteocles and Polynices, in order to avoid bloodshed, agreed to rule Thebes in alternate years. After the first year, Eteocles refused to step down, leading Polynices to raise an army of Argives (captained by the eponymous Seven) to take Thebes by force. This is where Aeschylus' tragedy starts.

== Plot summary ==
Seven Against Thebes features little action; instead, the bulk of the play consists of rich dialogues between the citizens of Thebes and their king Eteocles regarding the threat of the hostile army before their gates. Dialogues show aspects of Eteocles' character. There is also a lengthy description of each of the seven captains that lead the Argive army against the seven gates of the city of Thebes as well as the devices on their respective shields. Eteocles, in turn, announces which Theban commanders he will send against each Argive attacker. Finally, the commander of the troops before the seventh gate is revealed to be Polynices, the brother of the king. Then Eteocles remembers and refers to the curse of their father Oedipus. Eteocles resolves to meet and fight his brother in person before the seventh gate and exits. Following a choral ode, a messenger enters, announcing that the attackers have been repelled but that Eteocles and Polynices have killed each other in battle. Their bodies are brought on stage, and the chorus mourns them.

Due to the popularity of Sophocles' play Antigone, the ending of Seven Against Thebes was rewritten about fifty years after Aeschylus' death. While Aeschylus wrote his play to end with somber mourning for the dead brothers, it now contains an ending that serves as a lead-in of sorts to Sophocles' play: a messenger appears, announcing a prohibition against burying Polynices; his sister Antigone, however, announces her intention to defy this edict.

The seven attackers and defenders in the play are:

#	Attacker	Defender
1	Tydeus	Melanippus
2	Capaneus	Polyphontes
3	Eteoclus	Megareus
4	Hippomedon	Hyperbius
5	Parthenopaeus	Actor
6	Amphiaraus	Lasthenes
7	Polynices	Eteocles

== Mythic content ==
The mytheme of the "outlandish" and "savage" Seven who threatened the city has traditionally seemed to be based on Bronze Age history in the generation before the Trojan War, when in the Iliad's Catalogue of Ships only the remnant Hypothebai ("Lower Town") subsists on the ruins of Thebes. Yet archaeologists have been hard put to locate seven gates in "seven-gated Thebes": In 1891 Ulrich von Wilamowitz-Moellendorff declared that the seven gates existed only for symmetry with the seven assailants, whose very names vary: some have their own identity, like Amphiaraus the seer, "who had his sanctuary and his cult afterwards... Others appear as stock figures to fill out the list," Burkert remarks. "To call one of them Eteoklos, vis-à-vis Eteokles the brother of Polyneikes, appears to be the almost desperate invention of a faltering poet" Burkert follows a suggestion made by Ernest Howald in 1939 that the Seven are pure myth led by Adrastos (the "inescapable") on his magic horse, seven demons of the Underworld; Burkert draws parallels in an Akkadian epic text, the story of Erra the plague god, and the Seven (Sibitti), called upon to destroy mankind, but who withdraw from Babylon at the last moment. The city is saved when the brothers simultaneously run each other through. Burkert adduces a ninth-century relief from Tell Halaf which would exactly illustrate a text from II Samuel 2: "But each seized his opponent by the forelock and thrust his sword into his side so that all fell together."

The mythic theme passed into Etruscan culture: a fifth-century bronze mirrorback is inscribed with Fulnice (Polynices) and Evtucle (Eteocles) running at one another with drawn swords. A particularly gruesome detail from the battle, in which Tydeus gnawed on the living brain of Melanippos in the course of the siege, also appears, in a sculpted terracotta relief from a temple at Pyrgi, ca. 470–460 BC.

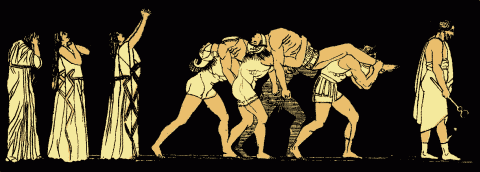
Eteocles and Polynices being carried away, dead, after the Battle of Thebes, by Alfred John Church

The Epigoni, the sons of the Seven against Thebes, were the mythic theme of the second war of Thebes, which occurred ten years after their fathers had fought in the first war of Thebes.

== Laius, Oedipus and The Sphinx ==
Of the other two plays that made up the trilogy that included Seven Against Thebes, Laius and Oedipus, and of its satyr play The Sphinx, few fragments have survived. The only fragment definitively assigned to Oedipus is a line translated by Herbert Weir Smyth as "We were coming on our journey to the place from which three highways part in the branching roads, where we crossed the junction of the triple roads at Potniae." The only two fragments definitively assigned to The Sphinx were translated by Smyth as "For the stranger a garland, an ancient crown, the best of bonds, as Prometheus said," and "The Sphinx, the Watch-dog that presideth over evil days."

== Critical reception ==
Translators David Grene and Richmond Lattimore wrote that "the rise of German Romanticism, and the consequent resurgence of enthusiasm for Aeschylus' archaic style and more direct and simple dramaturgy," resulted in the elevation of Seven Against Thebes as an early masterpiece of Western drama. From the nineteenth century onwards, however, it has not generally been regarded as among the tragedian's major works. Translators Anthony Hecht and Helen H. Bacon wrote that the play "has been accused of being static, undramatic, ritualistic, guilty of an interpolated and debased text, archaic, and in a word, boring," though they themselves disagree with such a description.

== Translations ==
- Robert Potter, 1777 - verse: full text
- Anna Swanwick, 1886 - verse: (full text available at Wikisource)
- A. S. Way, 1906 – verse
- E. D. A. Morshead, 1908 - verse: (full text available at Wikisource)
- Edwyn Bevan, 1912 – verse
- G. M. Cookson, 1922 - verse: (full text available at Wikisource)
- Herbert Weir Smyth, 1922 - prose: (full text available at Wikisource)
- David Grene, 1956 – verse
- Philip Vellacott, 1961 – verse
- Helen H. Bacon and Anthony Hecht, 1973 - verse
- Will Power, 2001 – verse, lyric
- George Theodoridis, 2010, prose: full text
- Ian C. Johnston, 2012, verse: full text

== See also ==
- Lille Stesichorus, a papyrus fragment of the Theban myth by the lyric poet Stesichorus
- Thebaid, an epic poem depicting the same battle by the Roman author Statius, published c. 91–92 AD.
