= Hipponous =

Several figures in Greek mythology

In Greek mythology, Hipponous (Ancient Greek: Ἱππόνοος) referred to several people:

- Hipponous, the Olenian father of Capaneus and Periboea by Astynome. He was son of Iocles, grandson of Astacus and great-grandson of Hermes and Astabe, a daughter of Peneus.
- Hipponous, one of the fifty sons of Priam. He may have been one of the last Trojans whom Achilles killed before his death.
- Hipponous, an Achaean warrior killed by Hector.
- Hipponous, son of Triballus. He was the father of Polyphonte by Thrassa, the daughter of Ares and Tereine.
- Hipponous, who together with his father, son of Adrastus, were said to have thrown themselves into fire in obedience to an oracle of Apollo.
- Hipponous, the birth name of Bellerophon.
