= Parthenopaeus =

Greek mythological figure

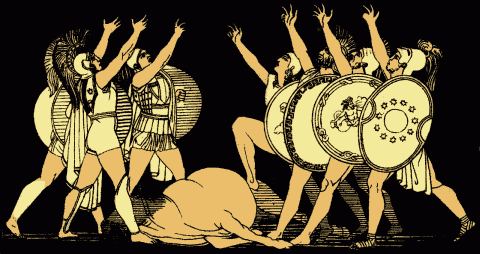
The Oath Of The Seven Chiefs

In Greek mythology, Parthenopaeus or Parthenopaios (/pɑːrˌθɛnəˈpiːəs/; Ancient Greek: Παρθενοπαῖος, romanized: Parthenopaîos, lit. 'virgin woman's son') was one of the Seven against Thebes, a native of Arcadia, described as young and outstandingly good-looking, but at the same time arrogant, ruthless and over-confident, although an unproblematic ally for the Argives.

== Mythology ==
=== Early life ===
Parthenopaeus was the son of Atalanta by either her husband Melanion, or by Meleager, or Ares. A less common version makes him a son of Talaus and Lysimache (which would make him a close relative of the other members of the Seven and thereby a motive for his involvement in the war). Hyginus writes that he was left exposed by Atalanta on Mount Parthenius ("virginal") in Arcadia, so that she could conceal the fact that she was not a virgin anymore; the name Parthenopaeus is accordingly interpreted by Hyginus as "seemingly-virginal" or the like, as if referring to the fact that his mother was pretending to still be a virgin. He was subsequently rescued by a shepherd, along with Telephus, the son of Auge and Heracles, who had been abandoned on the same mountain, and the two boys became good friends. Parthenopaeus went with Telephus to Teuthrania, where he helped him repulse Idas's invasion of the kingdom of Teuthras.

Euripides noted that Parthenopaeus moved from Arcadia to Argos at a young age, and seemed to have enjoyed a friendly reception from the Argives.

=== War on Thebes ===
Parthenopaeus was persuaded by Adrastus to join in the war against Thebes. During the attack on Thebes, Parthenopaeus was the assailant on the Electran Gates, or, alternatively, the Neitian Gates. In Aeschylus' Seven Against Thebes, he is portrayed carrying a shield with the image of the Sphinx devouring Thebans, and swearing by his spear (which, it was said, was for him more sacred than the gods, and more precious than his own sight) to destroy the city even despite the will of Zeus. Yet according to Euripides, on the shield was depicted his mother shooting a wild boar. He was confronted by Actor at the gate. Parthenopaeus was killed by either Periclymenus or Amphidicus (Asphodicus), a son of Astacus. According to Euripides, Periclymenus killed him by heaving a load of stones on his head.

Parthenopaeus is given a detailed treatment in Book 9 of Statius' Thebaid, which concludes with his aristeia and death, which differs considerably from those cited above. In the poem, Parthenopaeus fights fiercely and vigorously, killing a number of opponents, and dismisses the advice of his tutor Dorceus, who calls on him to be more careful. In the meantime, Atalanta, tormented by nightmares of his non-return, prays to Artemis that he may survive, or at least die a glorious death. Eventually Ares, instigated by his mistress Aphrodite, makes Artemis retreat from the battlefield and causes Dryas, a son of Orion, to attack and dissolve the Arcadian contingent. Parthenopaeus, intimidated, still attempts to shoot Dryas but the latter mortally wounds him with a thrown spear, and is himself instantly killed by someone whose identity remains unrevealed. Parthenopaeus dies in the arms of his companions, giving last instructions to Dorceus, and admitting that he must have been too young to go to war.

In the Aeneid, the ghost of Parthenopaeus, along with those of other members of the Seven, is glimpsed by Aeneas in the Underworld.

The son of Parthenopaeus by the nymph Clymene, variously named Promachus, Tlesimenes or Stratolaus, was one of the Epigoni.
