= Eteocles =

Mythological king of Thebes

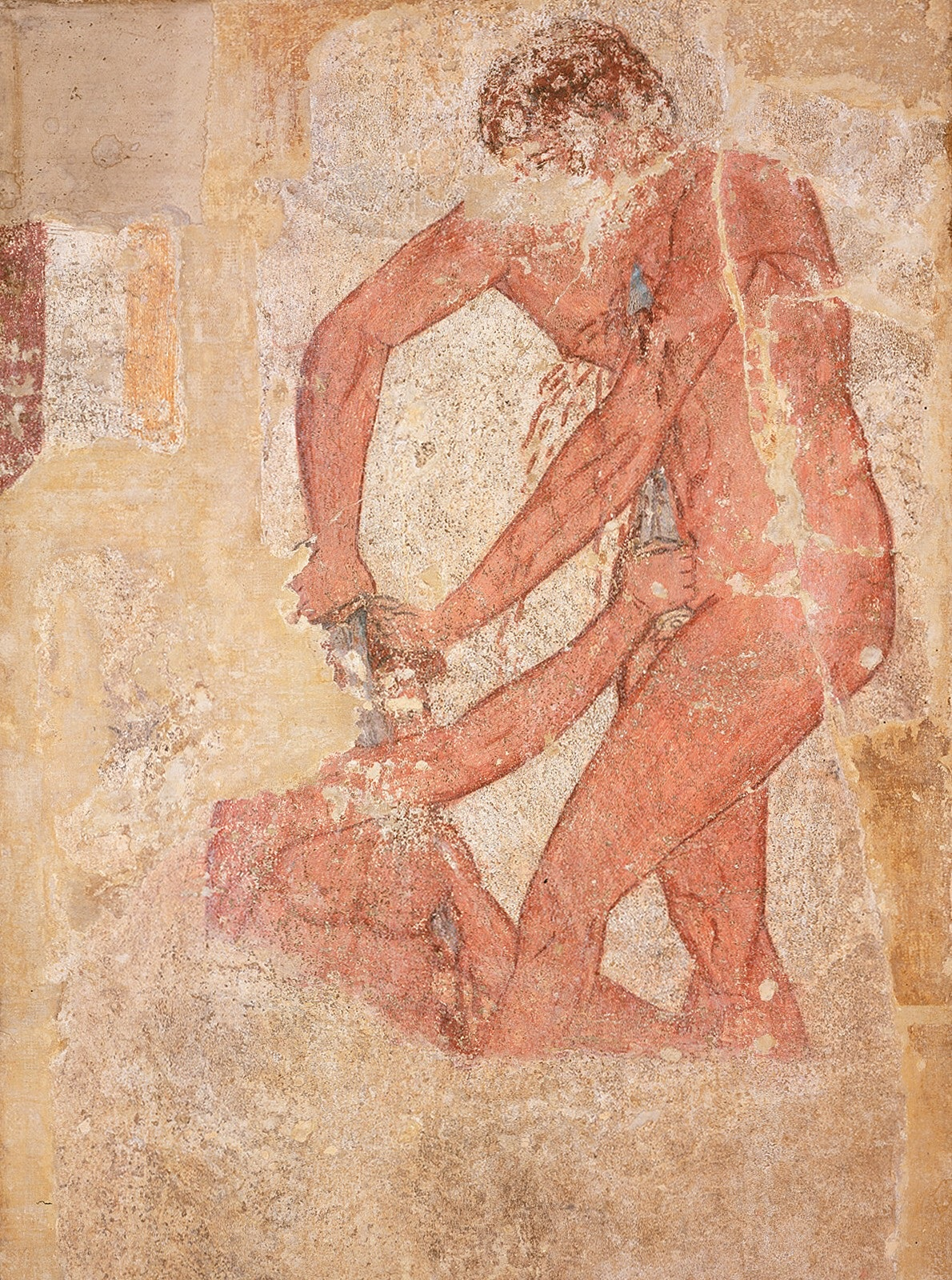
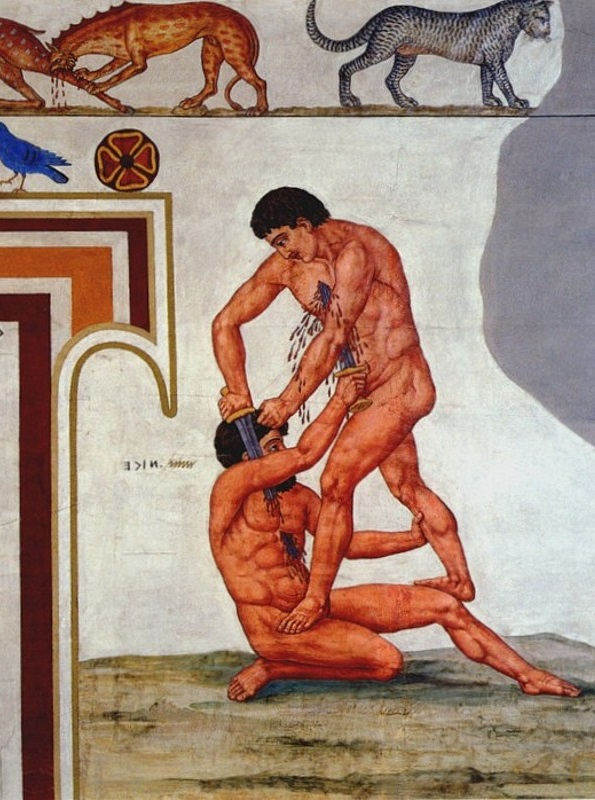
Mural of Eteocles and Polynices (left) and a recreation of it (right) in the François Tomb from Vulci, 4th century BC.

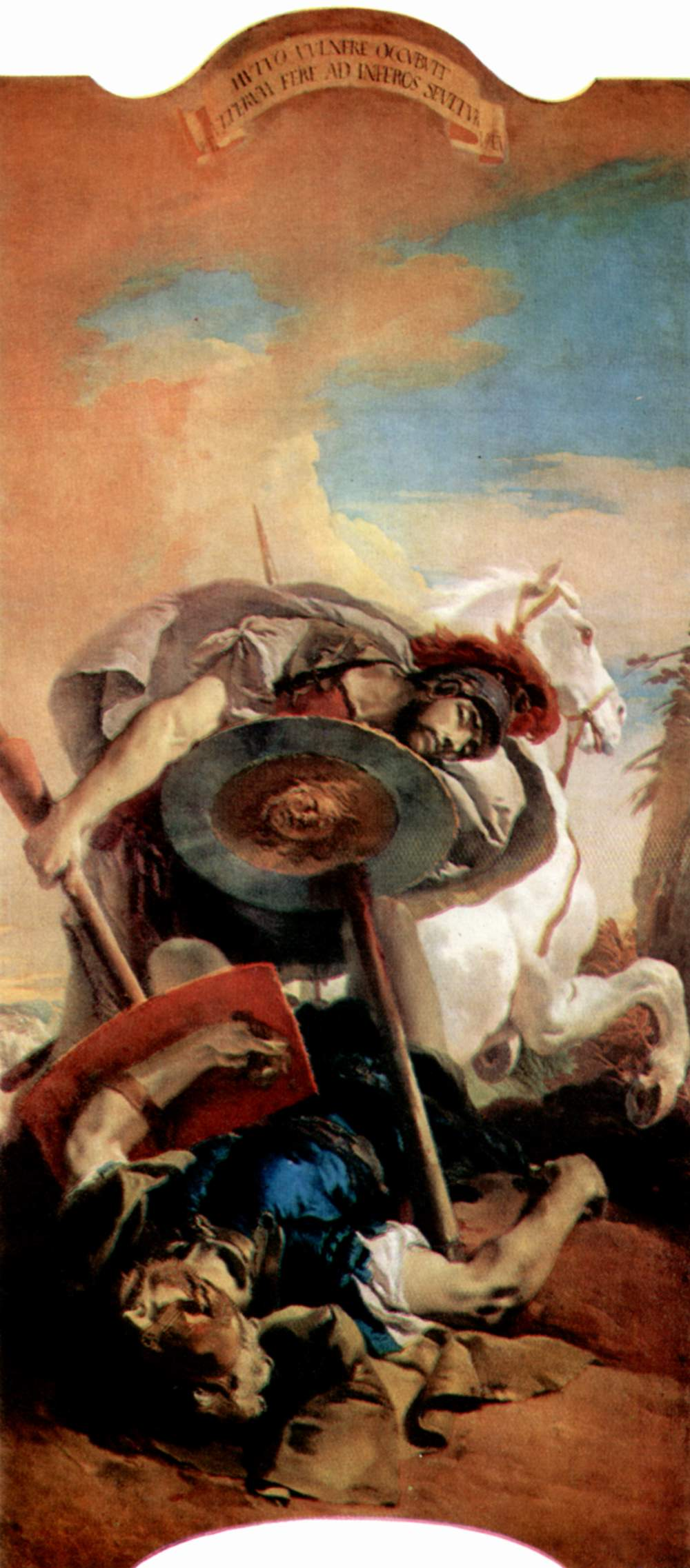
Eteocles and Polynices, by Giovanni Battista Tiepolo, from the Ca' Dolfin Tiepolos.

In Greek mythology, Eteocles (/ɪˈtiːəkliːz/; Ancient Greek: Ἐτεοκλῆς, romanized: Eteoklês, lit. 'true glory') was a king of Thebes, the son of Oedipus and either Jocasta or Euryganeia. Oedipus killed his father Laius and married his mother without knowing his relationship to either.

When the relationship was revealed, he was expelled from Thebes. The rule passed to his sons Eteocles and Polynices. However, because of a curse from their father, the two brothers did not share the rule peacefully and died as a result, ultimately killing each other in battle for control of the city. Upon his death, Eteocles was succeeded by his uncle, Creon.

== Etymology ==
The name translates as "truly glorious", from Ancient Greek: ἐτεός eteós ‘true’ and κλέος kleos ‘glory’. The name appears in earlier form *Etewoklewes (Ἐτεϝοκλέϝης), indicated by Mycenaean Greek e‍–‍te‍–‍wo‍–‍ke‍–‍le‍–‍we‍–‍i‍–‍jo, ‘his son’, ending in possessive case ‍–‍i‍–‍jo. Tawagalawas is thought to be the Hittite rendition of the Greek name.

== Oedipus's curse ==
In the Thebaid, the brothers were cursed by their father for their disrespect towards him on two occasions. The first of these occurred when they served him using the silver table of Cadmus and a golden cup, which he had forbidden. The brothers then sent him the haunch of a sacrificed animal, rather than the shoulder, which he deserved. Enraged, Oedipus prayed to Zeus that the brothers would die by each other's hands. However, in Sophocles's Oedipus at Colonus, Oedipus desired to stay in Thebes but was expelled by Creon. His sons argued over the throne, but Eteocles gained the support of the Thebans and expelled Polynices, who went to Oedipus to ask for his blessing to retake the city, but instead was cursed to die by his brother's hand.

== Quarrel over Thebes ==
There are several accounts of how Eteocles and Polynices shared the rule after Oedipus's departure from the city. In Hellanicus's account, Eteocles offers his brother his choice of either the rule of the city or a share of the property. In Pherecydes, however, Eteocles expels Polynices by force, and keeps the rule of Thebes and the inheritance. The Bibliotheca and Diodorus state that the brothers agree to divide the kingship between them, switching each year. Eteocles, however, was allotted the first year, and refused to surrender the crown.

In all of these versions, Polynices gathered the support of the Argives and attacked Thebes, in the war of Seven against Thebes, the subject of Aeschylus' tragedy Seven Against Thebes. Although Eteocles's forces were victorious, the brothers killed each other.

== Genealogy ==
Royal house of Thebes family tree
- Solid lines indicate descendants.
- Dashed lines indicate marriages.
- Dotted lines indicate extra-marital relationships or adoptions.
- Kings of Thebes are numbered with bold names and a light purple background.
  - Joint rules are indicated by a number and lowercase letter, for example, 5a. Amphion shared the throne with 5b. Zethus.
- Regents of Thebes are alphanumbered (format AN) with bold names and a light red background.
  - The number N refers to the regency preceding the reign of the N^{th} king. Generally this means the regent served the N^{th} king but not always, as Creon (A9) was serving as regent to Laodamas (the 10th King) when he was slain by Lycus II (the usurping 9th king).
  - The letter A refers to the regency sequence. "A" is the first regent, "B" is the second, etc.
- Deities have a yellow background color.

Harmonia	1. Cadmus	Polyxo	A4. Nycteus (Regent)	Dirce	B4 & A6. Lycus (Regent)
Zeus	Zeus
Ino	Agave	Echion	3. Polydorus	Nycteis	Antiope
Semele	Autonoë
Dionysus	2. Pentheus	Epeiros	4. Labdacus	5a. Amphion	5b. Zethus
Menoeceus
Eurydice	A7, A8 & A9. Creon (Regent)	Jocasta	6. Laius	Merope	Polybus
Hipponome	Alcaeus
Zeus
Alcmene	Amphitryon	Perimede	7. Oedipus
Megara	Heracles	Iphicles	Anaxo
Henioche	Megareus	Haemon	Antigone	8b. Eteocles	Argea	8a. Polynices
Pyrrha	Lycomedes	Ismene	9. Lycus II
A12. Peneleos (Regent)	10. Laodamas	Demonassa	11. Thersander
Opheltes	12. Tisamenus
14. Damasichthon	13. Autesion
15. Ptolemy	Theras	Argeia	Aristodemus
16. Xanthos	Eurysthenes	Procles

== See also ==
- Epigoni
- The Thebans

== Notes ==
Regnal titles
Preceded by Creon	Mythical King of Thebes	Succeeded by Creon
