= Epigoni =

Legendary figures in the second Argos-Thebes war in Greek mythology

In Greek mythology, the Epigoni or Epigonoi (/ɪˈpɪɡənaɪ/; from Ancient Greek: Ἐπίγονοι, meaning "offspring") are the sons of the Argive heroes, the Seven against Thebes, who had fought and been killed in the first Theban war, the subject of the Thebaid, in which Polynices and his allies attacked Thebes because Polynices' brother, Eteocles, refused to give up the throne as promised. The second Theban war, also called the war of the Epigoni, occurred ten years later, when the Epigoni, wishing to avenge the death of their fathers, attacked Thebes.

== List of Epigoni ==
According to the mythographer Apollodorus, they were:

- Aegialeus, son of Adrastus
- Alcmaeon, son of Amphiaraus
- Amphilochus, son of Amphiaraus
- Diomedes, son of Tydeus
- Euryalus, son of Mecisteus
- Promachus, son of Parthenopaeus
- Sthenelus, son of Capaneus
- Thersander, son of Polynices

To this list, the geographer Pausanias also adds:

- Polydorus, son of Hippomedon
- Adrastus and Timeas, sons of Polynices

Hyginus also makes note of:

- Biantes and Tlesimenes, sons of Parthenopaeus

Comparative Table of Epigoni's List
Epigoni	Father among Seven	Sources		
Epigoni	Against Thebes	Apollodorus	Pausanias	Hyginus
Aegialeus	Adrastus	✓	✓	✓
Alcmaeon	Amphiaraus	✓	✓	✓
Amphilochus	Amphiaraus	✓	✓	
Diomedes	Tydeus	✓	✓	✓
Euryalus	Mecisteus	✓	✓	
Promachus	Parthenopaeus	✓	✓	
Sthenelus	Capaneus	✓	✓	✓
Thersander	Polynices	✓	✓	✓
Polydorus	Hippomedon		✓	✓
Adrastus	Polynices		✓	
Timeas	Polynices		✓	
Biantes				✓
Tlesimenes				✓

== The war ==
Both Apollodorus and Pausanias tell the story of the war of the Epigoni, although their accounts differ in several respects. According to Apollodorus, the Delphic oracle had promised victory if Alcmaeon was chosen their leader, and so he was. Aegialeus was killed by Laodamas, son of Eteocles, but Alcmaeon killed Laodamas. The Thebans were defeated and, by the counsel of the seer Teiresias, fled their city. However, Pausanias says that Thersander was their leader, that Laodamas fled Thebes with the rest of the Thebans, and that Thersander became king of Thebes.

== As a poetic theme ==
Epigoni was an early Greek epic on this subject; it formed a sequel to the Thebaid and therefore was grouped by Alexandrian critics in the Theban cycle. Some counted it not as a separate poem but as the last part of the Thebaid. Only the first line is now known:

Now, Muses, let us begin to sing of younger men ...

Epigoni was a lost Greek tragedy by Sophocles. A few lines from this text have long been known because they were quoted in commentaries and lexica by ancient scholars. An additional fragment of several lines was discovered in 2005.

== In art ==
There were statues of the Epigoni at Argos and Delphi.
