= Hippomedon =

Several figures in Greek mythology

Hippomedon (/hɪˈpɒmɪdən/; Ἰππομέδων, gen.: Ἰππομέδοντος) may refer to several figures in Greek mythology:

- Hippomedon, one of the Seven against Thebes.
- Hippomedon, father of Ereuthalion.
- Hippomedon, son of Maenalus (or Hippasus) and the nymph Ocyrhoe, a defender of Troy killed by Neoptolemus.
- Hippomedon, father of Menoites. His son was another defender of Troy and was killed by Teucer.
