= Tydeus =

Figure in Greek mythology

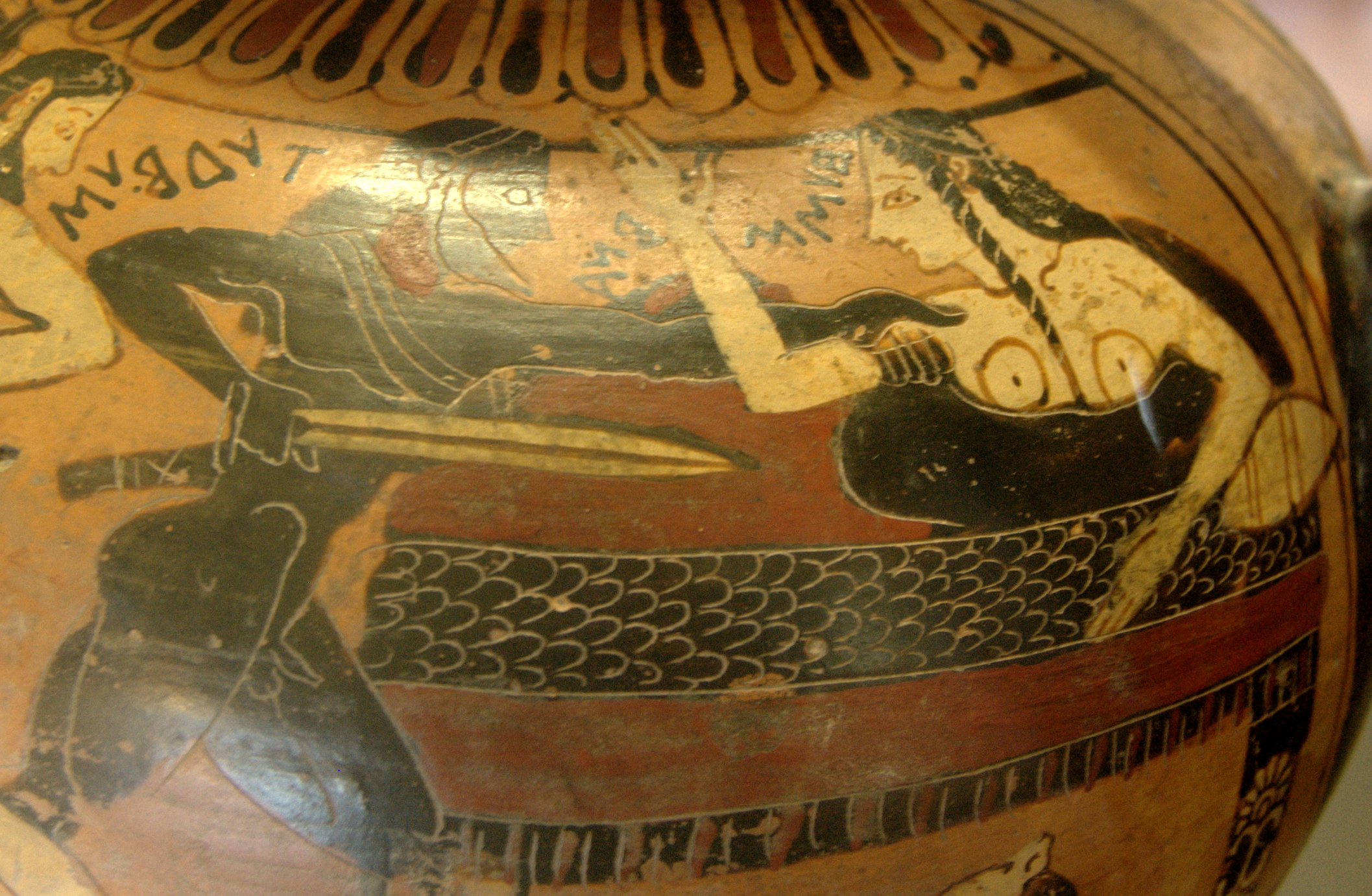
Tydeus kills Ismene, Corinthian black-figure amphora, c. 560 BC, Louvre (E 640).

Tydeus (/ˈtaɪdiəs, -djuːs, ˈtɪdiəs/; Ancient Greek: Τυδεύς Tūdeus) was an Aetolian hero in Greek mythology, belonging to the generation before the Trojan War. He was one of the Seven against Thebes, and the father of Diomedes, who is frequently known by the patronymic Tydides.

== Life ==
Tydeus was a son of Oeneus and either Periboea, Oeneus's second wife, or Gorge, Oeneus's daughter. He was the husband of Deipyle, the mother of Diomedes.

Tydeus was banished from Calydon by his uncle Agrius because he had killed either his brother or a different uncle or six of his cousins. He travelled to Argos, where he married Deipyle, daughter of king Adrastus.

=== Seven against Thebes ===
==== Gathering of the Seven ====
While housing Tydeus, King Adrastus of Argos also lodged Polynices, the exiled son of Oedipus who had shared the rule of Thebes with his brother Eteocles before he was expelled by the latter. Late one night, the two young exiles got into a fierce dispute over the guest room in Adrastus's palace. Awakened by the clamor, Adrastus rushed to the hall to find the two men locked in a brawl. It was then that Adrastus recalled a prophecy that had instructed him to "yoke his daughters to a boar and a lion". Adrastus recognized Tydeus as the boar and Polynices as the lion (either by the ferocious manner in which they fought, the animals emblazoned on their shields, or the animal skins they wore) and wed his daughters to them, keeping them as his sons-in-law in Argos.

Through marriage into Adrastus's family, Polynices and Tydeus became princes of Argos, had children, and generally lived well. Adrastus promised that he would help restore their kingdoms to them (or in other versions of the myth, Polynices asks Adrastus to help him take back Thebes) and he organized the expedition of the Seven against Thebes, and their army raised from Argolis (the area around Argos), the largest army that had ever appeared in Greece to that time.

==== Nemean Games ====
Shortly after the expedition arrived in Nemea, the young son of King Lycourgos was killed by a snake. In turn, Adrastus's men killed the serpent, buried the boy and held the first Nemean Games in his honor (other stories cite Heracles' triumph over the Nemean Lion as the cause of the first games). Tydeus won the boxing event at these games.

==== Envoy to Thebes ====
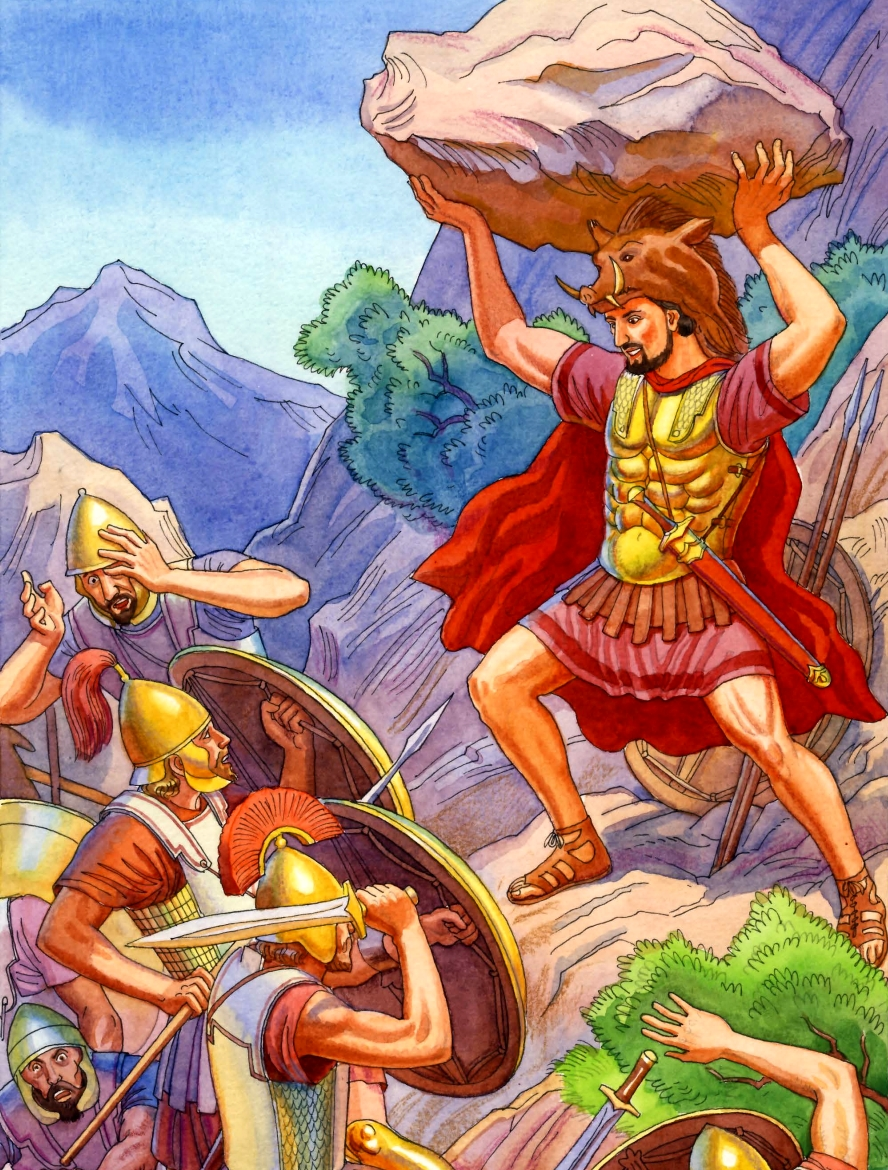
Tydeus, fighting with the soldiers of Eteocles

When the expedition reached Cithaeron, Tydeus was sent ahead to demand that the Thebans reinstate Polynices. Frustrated with being ignored by Eteocles, Tydeus issued one-on-one challenges to multiple men and vanquished each one with power granted to him by Athena.

While Tydeus returned to his allies, the Thebans amassed a force of fifty men, led by Maeon and Polyphontes, and ambushed him. Tydeus killed every man with the exception of Maeon, whom he allowed to live due to signs from the gods.

==== Cannibalism ====
During the war, Tydeus was mortally wounded by Melanippus, the son of Astacus. The goddess Athena intended to make Tydeus immortal, but the seer Amphiaraus, knowing this and hating Tydeus, cut off Melanippus' head and gave it to Tydeus, who proceeded to eat the brains of his killer. As was Amphiaraus's intention, Athena was so appalled that she changed her mind and let Tydeus die.

== In literature and art ==
The seventh-century-BC poet Mimnermus attributes the murder of Ismene, the sister of Antigone, to Tydeus. No other classical writer mentions the story, but the scene is represented on a 6th-century Corinthian black-figure amphora now housed in the Louvre.

Tydeus is mentioned multiple times in the Iliad. One of the most notable mentions is in Book IV where Agamemnon reminds Diomedes of the deeds of his father Tydeus. Agamemnon recites the events told in the section above.

Tydeus also appears, as one of the "Seven," in Aeschylus's play Seven Against Thebes and Euripides' The Phoenician Women. In Seven Against Thebes he kills the defender Melanippus, but is mortally wounded himself. In other versions of the myth, the detail is added that the goddess Athena had planned to make him immortal but changed her mind after Tydeus in a hubristic fit devoured the brain of the dead Melanippus.

In the Divine Comedy (Inf. XXXII.130–131), Dante compares the way Ugolino gnaws on the head of Ruggieri to the way Tydeus gnawed the temples of Melanippus. (Dante misspells the name "Menalippo [sic]," which is followed in some translations.)
