= The Phoenician Women =

Ancient Greek tragedy by Euripides

- Farewell of Oedipus to the Corpses of His Wife and Sons by Édouard Toudouze
- Original language: Ancient Greek
- Written by: Euripides
- Chorus: Phoenician Women
- Characters: Jocasta; Tutor; Antigone; Polynices; Eteocles; Creon; Teiresias; Menoeceus; First Messenger; Second Messenger; Oedipus
- Mute: daughter of Teiresias guards attendants
- Genre: Tragedy
- Setting: Before the royal palace of Ancient Thebes (Boeotia)

Premiere
- Place: Athens

The Phoenician Women (Ancient Greek: Φοίνισσαι, Phoinissai) is a tragedy by Euripides, based on the same story as Aeschylus' play Seven Against Thebes. It was presented along with the tragedies Hypsipyle and Antiope. With this trilogy, Euripides won the second prize. The title refers to the Greek chorus, which is composed of Phoenician women on their way to Delphi who are trapped in Thebes by the war. Unlike some of Euripides' other plays, the chorus does not play a significant role in the plot, but represents the innocent and neutral people who very often are found in the middle of war situations. Patriotism is a significant theme in the story, as Polynices talks a great deal about his love for the city of Thebes but has brought an army to destroy it; Creon is also forced to make a choice between saving the city and saving the life of his son.

== Plot ==
The play opens with a summary of the story of Oedipus and its aftermath told by Jocasta, who in this version has not committed suicide. She explains that after her husband blinded himself upon discovering that he was her son, his sons Eteocles and Polynices locked him away in hopes that the people might forget what had happened. He cursed them, proclaiming that neither would rule without killing his brother. To avert this, they have agreed to split the country – Polynices allows Eteocles to rule for one year. When the year expired, Eteocles was to abdicate, allowing his brother to rule for a year. He refused to do so, forcing his brother into exile instead. While exiled, Polynices went to Argos, where he married the daughter of Adrastus, king of the Argives. He then persuaded Adrastus to send a force to help him reclaim the city. Jocasta has arranged for a cease-fire so that she can mediate between her two sons.

She converses with Polynices about what his life in exile was like, and then listens to both of their arguments. Polynices re-explains the situation, and that he is the rightful king. Eteocles replies, saying that he desires power above all else and will not surrender it unless forced to. Jocasta reprimands them both, telling Eteocles his ambition may destroy the city and criticizing Polynices for bringing an army to sack the city he loves. They argue, but are unable to reach any agreement.

Eteocles then meets with his uncle, Creon, to plan for the coming battle; since the Argives are sending one company against each gate, the Thebans select one company to defend each of the seven gates. Eteocles also asks Creon to ask Teiresias for advice, and gives the order that anyone who buries Polynices in Theban soil is to be executed.

Teiresias reveals that Creon must kill his son Menoeceus. He explains that when the city was founded, it was by men who had sprung from the ground where Cadmus sowed the teeth of a serpent he had killed, but the serpent was sacred to Ares, who would punish Thebes unless a sacrifice was made. As only Creon and his son were pure-blooded descendants of the men who sprouted from the ground, Menoeceus was the only choice. Creon is told he can only save the city by sacrificing his son, and instructs Menoeceus to flee to the oracle at Dodona; Menoeceus agrees but secretly goes to the serpent's lair to sacrifice himself and appease Ares.

Jocasta then receives a messenger, who tells her about the progress of the war and that her sons are both alive, but have agreed to fight one-on-one for the throne. She and her daughter Antigone go to try to stop them. Shortly after they depart, Creon hears about how the duel has gone. Eteocles mortally wounded Polynices, who was able to deliver a fatal blow to his brother; the two died at the same instant. Jocasta, overcome with grief, kills herself immediately.

Antigone enters, lamenting the fate of her brothers; Oedipus emerges from the palace and she tells him what has happened. After he has a little while to mourn, Creon banishes him from the country and orders Eteocles but not Polynices to be buried in the city. Antigone fights him over the order and breaks off her engagement with his son Haemon. She decides to accompany her father into exile, and the play ends with them departing for Athens.

== The text ==
The text of the play is very poor, and scholars have detected several interpolations in the text. Over the centuries large and small interpolations have been inserted into this tragedy. Some scholars even believe that the whole play is post-Euripidean, written in the style of the late Euripides. For more about interpolations in the text, see Donald J. Mastronarde, Phoenissae.

== Translations ==
- Robert Potter, 1781 – verse: full text
- Edward P. Coleridge, 1891 – prose: "The Phoenician Maidens". The Plays of Euripides Translated into English Prose From the Text of Paley by Edward P. Coleridge. Vol. II. London: G. Bell and Sons, Ltd. 1913. pp. 217–273 – via Internet Archive.
- Arthur S. Way, 1912 – verse
- Elizabeth Wyckoff, 1958 – verse
- Andrew Wilson, 1994 – prose: full text
- Liz Lochhead, 2003 – dramatic adaptation as "Thebans", comprising Oedipus the King and Antigone by Sophocles and The Phoenician Women by Euripides
- John Davie, 2005 – Penguin Books – prose
- George Theodoridis, 2012 – prose, full text
- Brian Vinero, 2025 – rhymed verse,

== Remakes and literary adaptations ==
The Phoenician Women of Euripides was produced in a classical Meitei language version of a play, titled Hojang Taret, shown in multiple theatrical events of India, including but not limited to Mahindra Excellence in Theatre Awards (META), 19th Bharat Rang Mahotsav, 8th Theatre Olympics, among many.

== See also ==
- Papyrus Oxyrhynchus 224
