= Capaneus =

Son of Hipponous in Greek mythology

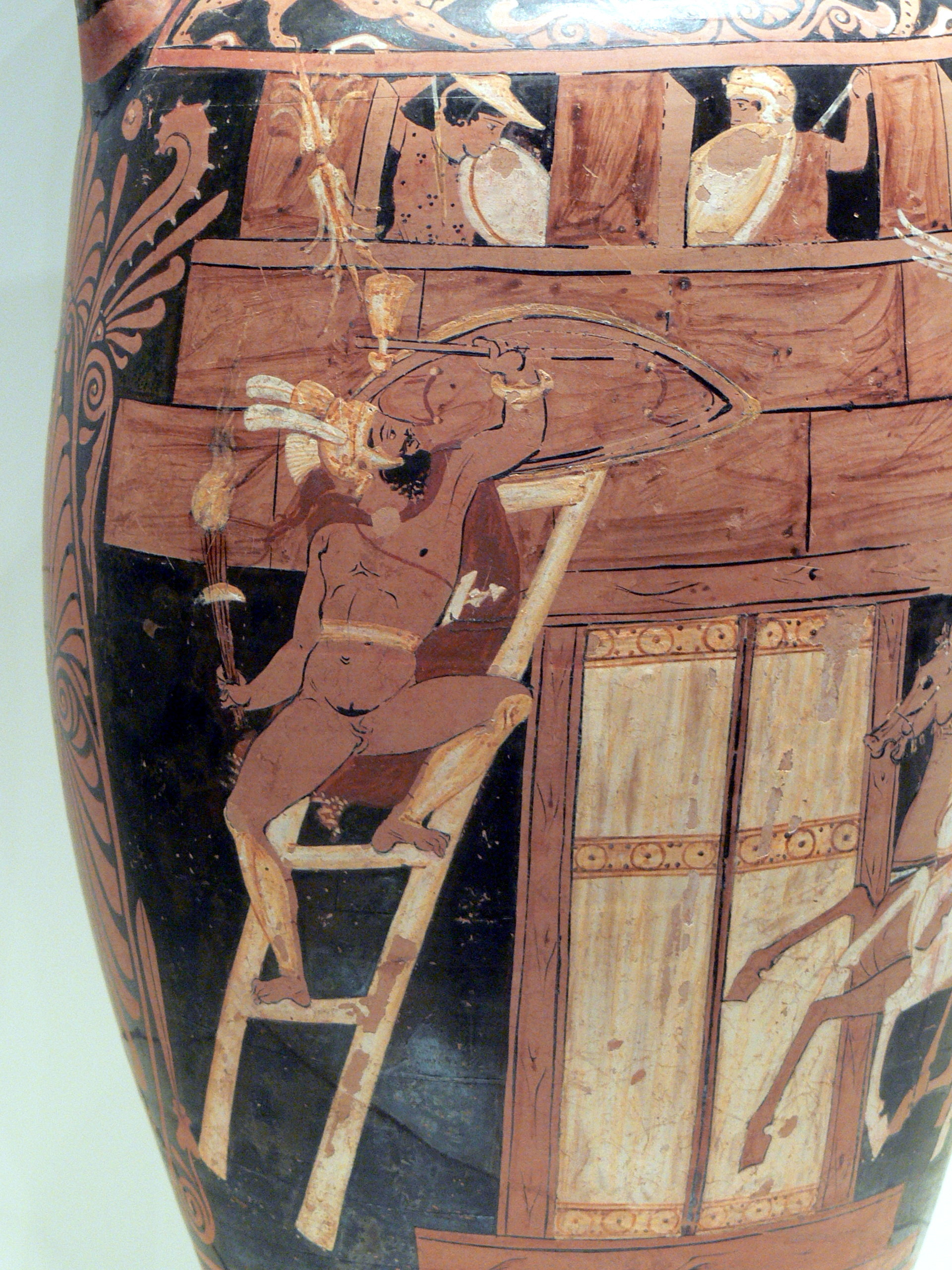
Capaneus scales the city wall of Thebes, Campanian red-figure Neck-amphora attributed to the Caivano Painter, ca. 340 BC, J. Paul Getty Museum (92.AE.86).

In Greek mythology, Capaneus (/kəˈpæn.juːs/; Ancient Greek: Καπανεύς Kapaneús) was a son of Hipponous and either Astynome (daughter of Talaus) or Laodice (daughter of Iphis), and husband of Evadne, with whom he fathered Sthenelus. Some call his wife Ianeira.

== Mythology ==
According to the legend, Capaneus had immense strength and body size and was an outstanding warrior. He was also notorious for his arrogance. He stood just at the wall of Thebes during the war of the Seven against Thebes and shouted that Zeus himself could not stop him from invading it. Vegetius refers to him as the first to use ladders in a siege. In Aeschylus, he bears a shield with a man without armour withstanding fire, a torch in hand, which reads 'I will burn the city,' in token of this. While he was mounting the ladder, Zeus struck and killed Capaneus with a thunderbolt, and Evadne threw herself on her husband's funeral pyre and died. His story was told by Aeschylus in his play Seven Against Thebes, by Euripides in his plays The Suppliants and The Phoenician Women, and by the Roman poet Statius.

== Popular culture ==
- In the fourteenth canto of his Inferno, Dante sees Capaneus in the seventh circle (third round) of Hell. Along with the other blasphemers, or those "violent against God", Capaneus is condemned to lie supine on a plain of burning sand while fire rains down on him. He continues to curse the deity (whom, being a pagan, he addresses as "Jove" [Jupiter]) despite the ever harsher pains he thus inflicts upon himself, so that God "thereby should not have glad vengeance."
- In Ezra Pound's poem Hugh Selwyn Mauberley, Capaneus is mentioned, with the implication that Mauberly (and by extension Pound himself) shared the ancient hero's daring and over-confidence.
- In Geoffrey Chaucer's collection The Canterbury Tales, in The Knight's Tale, Theseus meets a woman who declares herself to be the widow of Capaneus and criticizes her for crying and wailing, accusing her of being envious of his honour.

== See also ==
- List of mortals in Greek mythology
