= List of kings of Argos =

Before the establishment of a democracy, the Ancient Greek city-state of Argos was ruled by kings. Most of them are probably mythical or only semi-historical. This list is based on that largely given by Eusebius of Caesarea.

An alternative version supplied by Tatian of the original 17 consecutive kings of Argos includes Apis and Argios between Argos and Triopas.

== Inachid Dynasty ==
Inachos, the supposed son of Oceanos and Tethys, is affirmed to have been the founder of this kingdom. He married his sister Melia, by whom he had two sons, Phoroneus and Aegialeus: he is supposed to be the father of Io, and therefore the Greeks are sometimes called "Inachoi" after him (see also the names of the Greeks).

- Inachos.
- Phoroneus. Son of Inachos.
- Apis. Son of Phoroneus.
- Argos Pelasgos or Argeos. Son of Zeus and Niobe, the daughter of Phoroneus.

Argos named the kingdom after himself.

- Criasos or Pirasos or Peranthos. Son of Argos.
- Phorbas. Son of either Argos or Criasos.
- Triopas. Son of Phorbas.
- Jasos. According to different sources, he was son of either Phoroneus, Argos Pelasgos, Argos Panoptes, or Triopas.
- Agenor. Son of Triopas.
- Crotopos. Son of Agenor.
- Sthenelos.
- Pelasgos Gelanor. He gave Danaus his kingdom in response to an oracle or omen.

== Danaid Dynasty ==
- Danaos. Son of Belus, a mythical king of Egypt. Danaus had fifty daughters, the Danaides.
- Lynceus. Son of Aigyptos. Killed Danaus and married Danaus's daughter Hypermnestra.

Lynceus means "lynx-eyed".

== Abantiad Dynasty ==
- Abas. Son of Lynceus.
- Proetos. A son of Abas.
- Acrisios. A son of Abas. Twin brother of Proetos; they were rivals since the womb. Acrisios defeated and exiled Proetos and later shared the kingdom with him, surrendering to him Tiryns and eastern Argolis.
- Perseus Eurymedon. Son of Zeus and Danaë (the daughter of Acrisios). Perseus never reigned at Argos, traded the kingdom of Argos for that of Tiryns (which had been ruled by Megapenthes) and established the city and kingdom of Mycenae.
- Megapenthes. Son of Proetos.
- Argeos. Son of Megapenthes.

=== Lineage of Anaxagoras ===
- Anaxagoras. A descendant of Megapenthes. The kingdom of Argos was divided into three parts. One third was given to Melampos and another to Bias (brother of Melampos) while Anaxagoras and his lineage continued to rule the central region.
- Alector. Son of Anaxagoras.
- Iphis. Son of Alector.
- Sthenelos. Regained the portion of the kingdom given to Melampus upon the death of Amphilochus.
- Cylarabes, or Cylarabos, or Cylasabos. Son of Sthenelos. Regained the portion of the kingdom given to Bias upon the death of Cyanippus.

=== Lineage of Melampus ===
- Melampos.
- Antiphates.
- Oicles or Oikles or Oecles.
- Amphiaraus or Amphiaraos.
- Amphilochos. Son of Alcmaeon; he bequeathed his portion of the kingdom of Argos to Sthenelos.

=== Lineage of Bias ===
- Bias
- Talaus or Talaon. Son of Bias. One of the Argonauts.
- Adrastos. Son of Talaos. Name is translated traditionally as "nonparticipant" or "uncooperative". Reigned during the war of the Seven Against Thebes.
- Diomedes. According to legend, Cometes, son of Sthenelos, had an affair with Diomedes's wife Aegiale while Diomedes was away for the Trojan War.
- Cyanippus. Son of Aegialeus and grandson of Adrastus. Upon his death, Cylarabes assumed control of his kingdom, thus reuniting Argolis.

== Pelopid Dynasty ==
- Orestes. King of Mycenae and son of Agamemnon of the Trojan War. Orestes gained the throne of Argos and Sparta upon the death of Cylarabes.
- Tisamenos. Son of Orestes. He was the final king of Argos, Mycenae and Sparta before the kingdom was conquered by the Heracleidae.

== Heraclid Dynasty ==
Kings claimed to be descendants of the mythological hero Heracles, many themselves mythological, include

- Temenus. Son of Aristomachos. Ancestor of the royal Macedonian dynasty, the Temenids.
- Pheidon I. Son of Temenus.
- Deiphontes. Son-in-law of Temenos.
- Cisos or Ceisos. Temenos had left his kingdom to his son in law Deiphontes even though he had natural sons of his own. In consequence of this, Deiphontes was slain by the stratagems of the sons of Temenos, the eldest of whom, Cisos, became king.
- Medon. Son of Ceisos.
- Maron. Son of Ceisos.
- Thestros(also known as thestios). Son of Maron.
- Akoos(or Acous) or Merops. Sons of Thestros.
- Aristodamidas(or Aristodamis). Son of Akoos or Merops.
- Eratos(Eratus), a contemporary king to Nicander of Sparta
- Pheidon II. Son of Aristodamidas.
- Damocratidas(dated by G.Huxley at around 600 B.C).
- unknown
- Leokedes or Lacidas son of Pheidon.
- Meltas. Son of Lacidamos, grandson of Pheidon.

In historical times, kings of Argos lacked historical power, the tyrant king Pheidon excepted.

== Non-Heraclid Dynasty ==
This is the king after the heraaclids fell out.

- Aigon (Aegon). (According to Plutarch in Moralia)
