= Sthenelus (son of Capaneus) =

Figure in Greek mythology

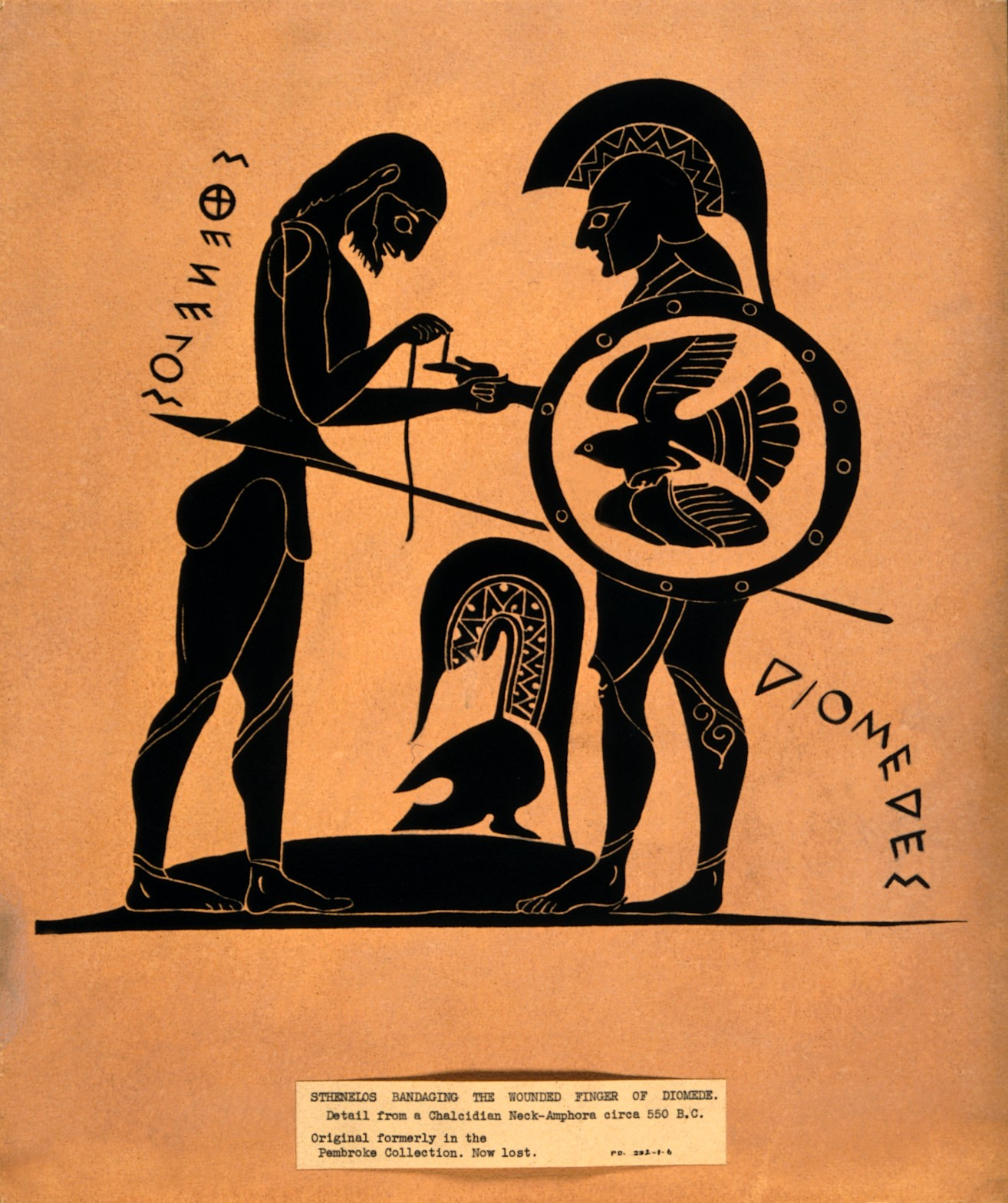
Drawing showing Sthenelus bandaging wounded Diomedes

In Greek mythology, Sthenelus (/ˈsθɛnələs, ˈstɛn-/; Ancient Greek: Σθένελος Sthénelos, "strong one" or "forcer", derived from sthenos "strength, might, force") was one of the Achaean Leaders. He was also counted as one of the Epigoni and a suitor of Helen.

In one account, he was described as "a good size and towering, gray-eyed, with an aquiline nose, fairly long-haired, ruddy, and hot-blooded."

== Family ==
Sthenelus was the son of Capaneus and Evadne. He was the father of Cylarabes and Cometes, lover of Aegialia.

== Mythology ==
Sthenelus' father Capaneus was one of the Seven Against Thebes. He was an outstanding warrior, but he was also notorious for his arrogance. He stood just at the wall of Thebes during the war of the Seven against Thebes and shouted that Zeus himself could not stop him from invading it. While he was mounting the ladder, Zeus struck and killed Capaneus with a thunderbolt. At his funeral, Sthenelus watched as his mother Evadne threw herself on her husband's funeral pyre and died.

The sons of the Seven Against Thebes, including Sthenelus, swore to avenge their fathers, after which they were called the Epigoni. Ten years later, they defeated the Thebans and took the city. Sthenelus ruled Iphis' half of Argos, along with Diomedes, after both Adrastus and Aegialeus had died.

Sthenelus fought alongside Diomedes and the other Argives in the Trojan War and brought 25 ships to Troy. At Mysia, Sthenelus, Diomedes, and Palamedes fought with and killed Haimos, a son of Ares.

In the Iliad, Agamemnon insults Sthenelus and Diomedes by comparing them to their fathers. While Diomedes keeps his composure, Sthenelus cannot contain his anger. He boasts that they are better than their fathers, because they were able to capture Thebes when their fathers had not been able to do so. This may indicate that he, like his father, is arrogant. However, when Diomedes advises him not to argue with Agamemnon further, he heeds Diomedes' counsel, showing that he is capable of thinking rationally, even in the heat of anger.

According to Philostratus, it was Sthenelus who fought and killed Pandarus, rather than Diomedes. Sthenelus also opposed the building of the Achaean wall in their camp, and called the Trojan Horse a theft of battle.

The Iliad portrays Sthenelus and Diomedes as close companions both on and off the battlefield. Sthenelus drives Diomedes' chariot and advises him in battle. Their close relationship is emphasized by Diomedes when he proclaims that, even if all the other Achaeans lose faith and return home, he and Sthenelus will stand together and fight until Troy falls.

Sthenelus was one of the men who hid in the Trojan horse.

When Diomedes returned to Argos after the fall of Troy, he learned that his wife Aegiale was having an affair with Cometes, the son of Sthenelus. They plotted to kill Diomedes, but he was able to escape and travel to Italy. It is unknown if Sthenelus joined him or stayed in Argos. He was succeeded by his son Cylarabes. During Cylarabes' reign, Argos was finally reunited after having been divided into three parts since the reign of Anaxagoras.

== Namesakes ==
Minor planet 3794 Sthenelos is named after him.

Regnal titles
Preceded by Iphis	King of Argos	Succeeded by Cylarabes
