= Bias (son of Amythaon) =

Mythical character

In Greek mythology, Bias (/ˈbaɪ.əs/; Ancient Greek: Βίας), was one of the three kings of Argos when the kingdom was divided into three domains. The other kings were his brother Melampus and Anaxagoras. From Bias, they say, a river in Messenia was called.

== Family ==
According to Pausanias, Amythaon was the father of Bias and the seer Melampus by Idomene, daughter of Pheres or Abas of Argos; otherwise their mother was called Aglaia. Bias was the father of Talaus by his first wife Pero while together with Iphianassa, daughter of Proetus, had a daughter Anaxibia (Alphesiboea) who married Pelias, to whom she bore Acastus and several daughters. It is mentioned by Apollonius of Rhodes that Bias had three sons: Talaus, Arëius, and Leodocus who were crew of the Argo. One source, named the children of Bias as Perialces, Aretos and Alphesiboea.

== Mythology ==
Bias married his cousin Pero who was the daughter of Neleus. It was said that Neleus would not allow his daughter to marry anyone unless the suitor brought him the oxen of Iphiclus. These Melampus achieved with courage and using his supernatural abilities of speaking with animals, upon winning the challenge he arranged the marriage of Pero and Bias. The couple had one child together, Talaus.

When Pero died, Bias remarried Iphianassa, daughter of Proetus, after Melampus had cured her, her sisters and the Argive women from madness. He received one third of Proetus's kingdom all of which he gave to Bias. According to Pausanias, the Biantidae continued to rule in Argos for four generations: Bias – Talaus – Adrastus – Diomedes – Cyanippus.
