= Amphalces =

Mythological Greek prince

In Greek mythology, Amphalces (Ancient Greek: Ἀμφάλκης) was an Argive prince as son of King Antiphates and Zeuxippe, daughter of Hippocoon. He was the brother of Oicles, father of the seer Amphiaraus.
