= Iphianeira =

Disambiguation article

In Greek mythology, the name Iphianeira (/ˌɪfiəˈnaɪərə/; Ancient Greek: Ἰφιάνειρα) may refer to two women, great-grandmother and great-granddaughter:

- Iphianeira, daughter of Megapenthes and wife of Melampus, mother of Antiphates, Bias, Pronoe and Manto.
- Iphianeira, granddaughter of the precedent's son Antiphates and Zeuxippe, daughter of Oicles and Hypermnestra, sister of Amphiaraus and Polyboea.
