= Proetids =

Argive princesses in Greek mythology

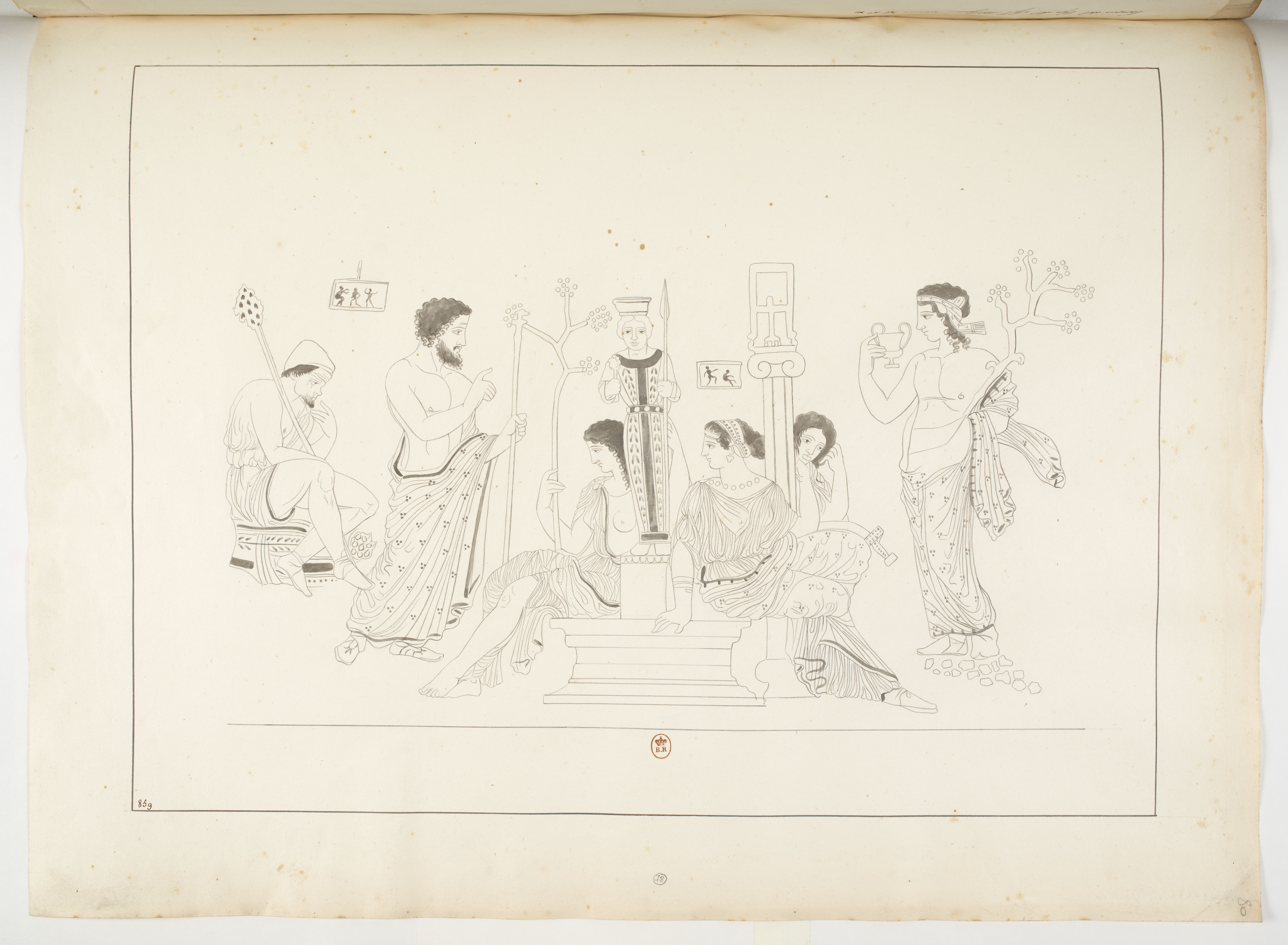
Melampus and the Proetids in the temple of Artemis, by Aubin-Louis Millin (1759–1818).

In ancient Greek and Roman mythology, the Proetids or Proetides (Ancient Greek: Προιτίδες, romanized: Proitídes, lit. 'daughters of Proetus') are three Argive princesses–namely Lysippe, Iphinoë, and Iphianassa–daughters of King Proetus and Queen Stheneboea (or Antea) of Argos, an ancient Greek city-state. The three of them were arrogant and vain, and were driven mad for disrespecting the gods. They roamed the countryside of the Argolid and even the rest of the Peloponnese in a frenzied fashion, sometimes causing other women to join them as well. They were only healed when the seer Melampus purified them, who then got two thirds of the kingdom and Iphianassa's hand in marriage as a prize.

== Family and names ==
The Proetids were the daughters of King Proetus and his queen Stheneboea (also called Antea), and their names were Iphinoë, Lysippe and Iphianassa. Some traditions mention only Lysippe and Iphianassa, dropping Iphinoë. At least two authors placed the events of the myths during the reign of Anaxagoras, their nephew, instead of Proetus.

== Mythology ==
=== Crime and punishment ===
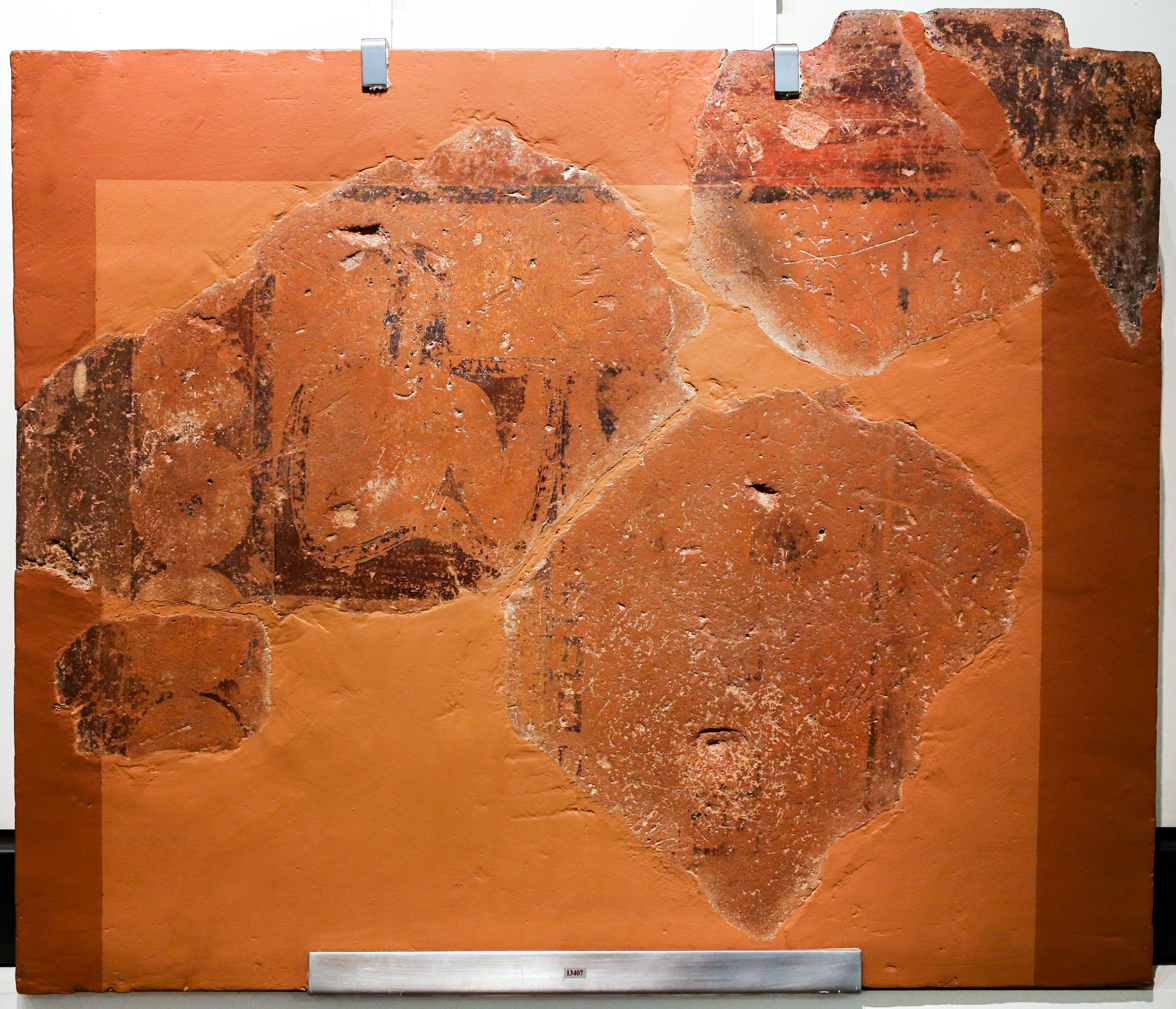
A painted terracotta metope from the temple of Apollo at Thermos depicting two bare-breasted women, perhaps the Proetids, circa 630s BC.

Many men courted the three beautiful princesses, but they were insolent against the gods, though their exact act of hubris varies depending on version; some authors wrote that they rejected the worship and divinity of Dionysus, or that they incurred the wrath of Hera, either by disregarding her beauty and seeing their own as superior, insulting the sacred wooden image of the goddess, claiming their wealth and palace were grander than Hera's, or stealing gold from her cult statue in order to adorn themselves in their vanity.

The result of all versions is that the offended deity drove the girls mad, who then proceeded to rave uncontrollably. Late accounts that follow the Hera version record that the queen of the gods made the Proetids think they were cows (an animal sacred to Hera), resulting in them bellowing like bovines and looking for horns in their heads, or even actually turning them into cows. Hesiod wrote that they contracted some skin disease that gave them spots, made their hair fall and exhibit lewd behaviour, their youth vanishing.

A Roman-era writer, Aelian, named the goddess Aphrodite as the culprit, who cursed the women (here called Elege and Celaene) with excessive sexual desire that made them race across the Peloponnese nude and out of their minds. Aelian does not name Aphrodite's motivation for the punishment. The Proetids roamed the countryside in wild state for thirteen months or even as much as ten years, bringing despair to their father Proetus who even contemplated suicide, but he was restrained by his spearmen.

=== Melampus ===
In Bacchylides Proetus prayed to Artemis who then convinced Hera to lift the curse, but most versions have it that it was the renowned seer Melampus who fixed the king's sorrows. Melampus agreed to cure the Proetids if he received one third of Proetus' kingdom for his services (or sometimes even half or it). Proetus found the price outrageous and refused. The frenzy of the Proetids continued, only this time several Argolid women joined them in their madness and started killing their children. Sometimes, the site of their ravanging is given as Clitor in Arcadia.

Even more desperate than before, Proetus re-approached Melampus and asked him again to cure his daughters and the other women. This time Melampus asked for one third of the kingdom for himself and another third for his brother Bias. Proetus, fearing that more delays would lead to bigger catastrophes and even higher prices, agreed. Melampus took some men and chased the women around the mountains of Sicyon with shouts and a frenzied dance. The eldest Proetid, Iphinoë, perished, but all the other women were cured. Other accounts say that Melampus saved them at the sanctuary of Artemis in Lusi, earning the goddess the epithet ‘Hemerasia’ (the soother), or that he appeased Hera and purified the spring from which the Proetids had drunk water. According to a different tradition, Melampus used water from a spring near the river Anigrus (a small stream in Elis) whose cleansing water had the ability to cure leprosy, elephantiasis, and scabies, or just threw them into the river itself.

After the two surviving Proetids came back to their senses, Iphianassa was given as a bride to Melampus, and Lysippe married Bias, and each got one third of the kingdom of Proetus as agreed. The king then built a temple for Apollo at Sicyon.

== Interpretation ==
The story of the Proetids might be connected to rituals about maiden girls reaching maturity and subsequently the tension created between a newlywed woman's attachment to her birthplace and the need to leave it behind for her marriage. Melampus being a seer of Dionysus, and the Proetids killing children in some versions, point to some intermingling with the myth of the Minyads. It has been noted that the Proetids belongs to a mythological motif where Dionysus clashes with a non-believer that refuses to honour him, and the mortal suffers disastrous consequences. The versions with Dionysus and Hera might had been separate traditions involving Argive women that were combined.

The Proetids were included in the fragmentary Catalogue of Women (or Ehoiai), a seventh-century BC work with all the legendary women, their myths and their offsprings, which connected their malady with wantonness. Melampus' cure of them was included in both the Ehoiai and the Melampodia, the lost epic poem that recounted the seer's adventures.

The myth illustrates how in Greek mythology female nakedness, especially among maiden girls, is to be preserved and concealed behind clothing, unlike male nudeness which signifies empowerment and does not need aidos (modesty) as a body in control of itself and its desires. The lust that consumes the Proetids is a most inappropriate behaviour for virgins, and the word used in the ancient Greek text, makhlosune, 'belongs to the discourse of prostitution.' This is made apparent in the way the myth describes as having lost their bloom, while the cow sounds (a rare case of the female animal being deeper than the male) show the inversion of the natural order.

== See also ==
Other hubris myths related to Hera:

- Gerana
- Antigone
- Side
- Aëdon

== Bibliography ==
=== Primary sources ===
- Aelian, Historical Miscellany, edited and translated by N. G. Wilson, published by Harvard University Press, Loeb Classical Library 486, 1997. ISBN 0-674-99535-X. Google books.
- Apollodorus, Apollodorus, The Library, with an English Translation by Sir James George Frazer, F.B.A., F.R.S. in 2 Volumes. Cambridge, MA, Harvard University Press; London, William Heinemann Ltd. 1921. Online version at the Perseus Digital Library.
- Bacchylides, Epinician Odes, translated into English by Diane Arnson Svarlien. 1991. Online version at the Perseus Digital Library.
- Diodorus Siculus, Library of History, Volume III: Books 4.59-8, translated by C. H. Oldfather, Loeb Classical Library No. 340. Cambridge, Massachusetts, Harvard University Press, 1939. ISBN 978-0-674-99375-4. Online version at Harvard University Press. Online version by Bill Thayer.
- Herodotus, The Histories, with an English translation by A. D. Godley. Cambridge. Harvard University Press. 1920. Online version available at The Perseus Digital Library.
- Hesiod (1967). Merkelbach, Reinhold; West, Martin Litchfield (eds.). Fragmenta Hesiodea. Oxford University Press.
- Lactantius Placidus (1898). Lactantii Placidi qui dicitur Commentarios in Statii Thebaida it Commentarium in Achilleida [Lactantius Placidus' Commentary on Statius's Thebaid and Achilleid] (in Latin). Translated by Jahnke, Richard. Lipsiae: in aedibvs B. G. Tevbneri. LCCN 06008769. OL 21778486M.
- Ovid, Metamorphoses, with an English prose translation by A. S. Kline, 2000. Text available online at Poetry in Translation.
- Pausanias, Description of Greece with an English Translation by W.H.S. Jones, Litt.D., and H.A. Ormerod, M.A., in 4 Volumes. Cambridge, MA, Harvard University Press; London, William Heinemann Ltd. 1918. Online version at the Perseus Digital Library.
- Pepin, Ronald E. (2008). The Vatican Mythographers. New York City: Fordham University Press. ISBN 978-0-8232-2892-8.
- Servius, In Vergilii carmina comentarii. Servii Grammatici qui feruntur in Vergilii carmina commentarii; recensuerunt Georgius Thilo et Hermannus Hagen. Georgius Thilo. Leipzig. B. G. Teubner. 1881. Online version at the Perseus Digital Library.
- Stephanus of Byzantium, Ethnica, edited by August Meineike (1790–1870), published 1849. A few entries from this important ancient handbook of place names have been translated by Brady Kiesling. Available online at Topos Text.
- Strabo, The Geography of Strabo. Edition by H.L. Jones. Cambridge, Mass.: Harvard University Press; London: William Heinemann, Ltd. 1924. Online version at the Perseus Digital Library.
- Virgil, The Eclogues, translated into English by J. B. Greenough. Boston. Ginn & Co. 1895. Available online at Perseus Digital Library.

=== Secondary sources ===
- Bell, Robert E. (1991). Women of Classical Mythology: A Biographical Dictionary. ABC-Clio. ISBN 9780874365818.
- Bremmer, Jan N. (October 1, 2006). "Proetids". In Cancik, Hubert; Schneider, Helmuth (eds.). Brill's New Pauly. Translated by Christine F. Salazar. Groningen: Brill Reference Online. ISSN 1574-9347.
- Ferrari, Gloria (2002). Figures of speech: Men and Maidens in ancient Greece. University of Chicago Press. ISBN 0-226-24436-9.
- Gantz, Timothy (1993). Early Greek Myth: A Guide to Literary and Artistic Sources. Vol. I. Johns Hopkins University Press. ISBN 978-0-8018-5360-9.
- Grimal, Pierre (1987). The Dictionary of Classical Mythology. Wiley-Blackwell. ISBN 0-631-13209-0.
- Hard, Robin (2004). The Routledge Handbook of Greek Mythology: Based on H. J. Rose's "Handbook of Greek Mythology". Routledge. ISBN 9780415186360.
