= Cylarabes =

Cylarabes (Greek: Κυλαράβης), or Cylarabos, or Cylasabos, son of Sthenelus, was a mythological king of Argos.

== Mythology ==
He succeeded to the throne upon the death of his father. During his reign Argos was finally reunited after having been divided into three parts since the reign of Anaxagoras. Anaxagoras had given one third of his kingdom to Melampus and the other to Bias while Anaxagoras and his line continued to rule the central region. Cylarabes regained the portion of the kingdom given to Bias upon the death of Cyanippus. (The portion belonging to the line of Melampus had been regained by his father Sthenelus, upon the death of Amphilocus). Cylarabes died without an heir and his vacant throne was seized by Orestes, the king of Mycenae.

Regnal titles
Preceded by Sthenelus	King of Argos	Succeeded by Orestes
