= Antiphates =

Set of mythological Greek characters

In Greek mythology, Antiphates (/ænˈtɪfətiːz/; Ancient Greek: Ἀντιφάτης) is the name of five characters.

- Antiphatês, son of Melampus and Iphianeira, the daughter of Megapenthes. He married Zeuxippe, the daughter of Hippocoon. Their children were Oecles and Amphalces.
- Antiphates, one of Greek warriors who hid in the Trojan horse.
- Antíphates, a Trojan warrior, slain by Leonteus, commander of the Lapiths during the Trojan War.
- Antiphates, King of the Laestrygones, a mythological tribe of gigantic cannibals. He was married and had a daughter. When he was visited by a scouting party sent by Odysseus, he ate one of the men on the spot and raised a hue-and-cry to ensure most of the rest of Odysseus' company would be hunted down.
- Antiphates, son of Sarpedon, who accompanied Aeneas to Italy where he was killed by Turnus.
