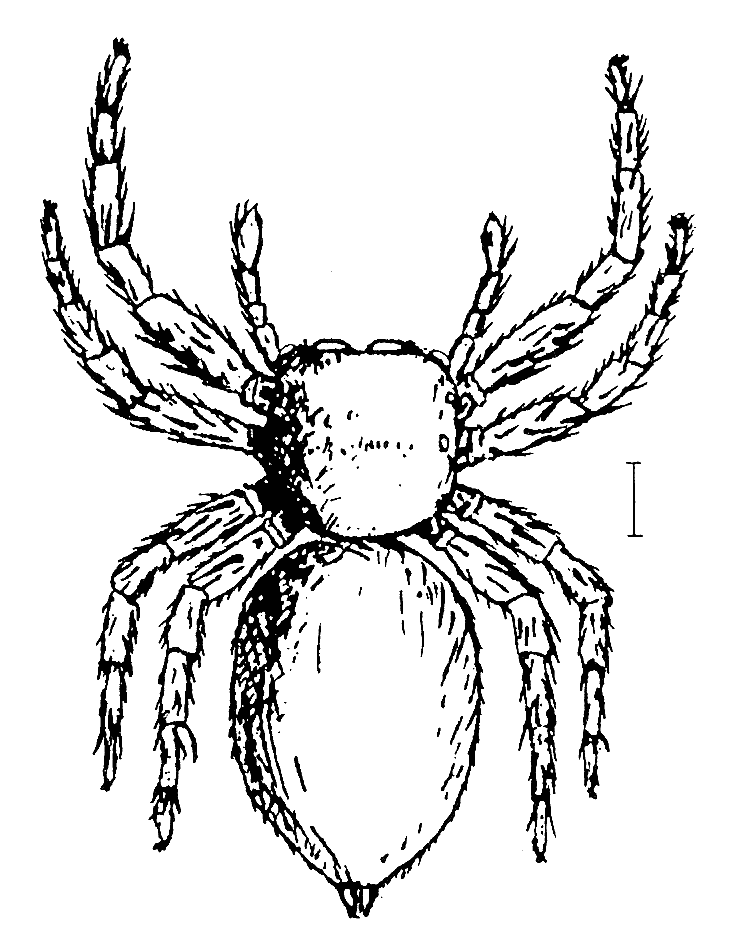
- female M. russatus

Scientific classification
- Kingdom: Animalia
- Phylum: Arthropoda
- Subphylum: Chelicerata
- Class: Arachnida
- Order: Araneae
- Infraorder: Araneomorphae
- Family: Salticidae
- Subfamily: Salticinae
- Genus: Mantius; Thorell, 1891

Type species
- Mantius russatus Thorell, 1891

Species
- See text.

= Mantius (spider) =

Genus of spiders

Mantius is a spider genus of the jumping spider family, Salticidae.

There is no recent information on any of the five described species from south east Asia. The genus is said to be close to Ptocasius.

== Description ==
Females are 5 to 8 mm (0.20 to 0.31 in) long, males 6 to 10 mm (0.24 to 0.39 in). The cephalothorax is often dark reddish brown. The abdomen is yellowish brown with whitish hairs and plump oval. The legs are yellowish brown except for the front pair, which is reddish brown.

== Name ==
Mantius was the son of Melampus and Lysippe in Greek mythology.

== Species ==
- Mantius armipotens Peckham & Peckham, 1907 – Borneo
- Mantius difficilis Peckham & Peckham, 1907 – Borneo
- Mantius frontosus (Simon, 1899) – Java
- Mantius ravidus (Simon, 1899) – Sumatra
- Mantius russatus Thorell, 1891 – Malaysia
