= Megapenthes (son of Proetus) =

Greek mythological king

In Greek mythology, Megapenthes (/ˌmɛɡəˈpɛnˌθiːz/; Ancient Greek: Μεγαπένθης, romanized: Megapénthēs, lit. 'great sorrow' or 'great grief') was a king of Argos.

== Family ==
Megapenthes was the son and successor of Proetus and father of either Argeus or Anaxagoras (in some accounts, Anaxagoras was his grandson through Argeus). He also had a daughter Iphianeira, who married Melampus.

== Mythology ==
Megapenthes exchanged kingdoms (Argos for Tiryns) with his cousin Perseus whom he killed much later.

Regnal titles
Preceded by Proetus	King of Tiryns	Succeeded by Perseus

Regnal titles
Preceded by Perseus	King of Argos	Succeeded by Argeus or Anaxagoras
