= Polypheides =

Mythological Greek characters

In Greek mythology, the name Polypheides or Polyphides (/ˌpɒlɪˈfaɪdiːz/; Ancient Greek: Πολυφείδης, romanized: Polypheidēs) may refer to:

- Polypheides, son of Mantius and brother of Cleitus. He was granted prophetic skills by Apollo and became the best seer among mortals after the death of Amphiaraus; he dwelt in Hyperesia and had a son Theoclymenus. A slightly different account of his life was given by Pherecydes: according to it, Polypheides married Aechme, daughter of Haemon, and settled in Eleusis, where two sons, Theoclymenus and Harmonides, were born to him.
- Polypheides, lord of Sicyon, to whom Agamemnon and Menelaus were entrusted by their nurse or sent by Aegisthus after the murder of Atreus. He further sent them to Oeneus. According to Eusebius, he was the twenty-fourth king of the Sicyonians and reigned for thirty-one years. During his reign, Troy was captured.
