= Mantius =

Ancient Greek character

Mantius is also a genus of jumping spiders.

In Greek mythology, Mantius (/ˈmæntiəs/; Ancient Greek: Μαντίος, lit. 'diviner, seer, prophet') was the son of Melampus and Iphianassa and the father of Cleitus, Polypheides and, in some versions, of Oicles.
