= 3794 Sthenelos =

Trojan asteroid

Discovery
- Discovered by: C. Shoemaker
- Discovery site: Palomar Obs.
- Discovery date: 12 October 1985

Designations
- Pronunciation: /ˈ(s)θɛnɪlɒs/
- Named after: Sthenelus (Greek mythology)
- Alternative designations: 1985 TF_{3} · 1949 SA; 1973 SU_{2}
- Minor planet category: Jupiter trojan Greek · background

Orbital characteristics
- Epoch 23 March 2018 (JD 2458200.5)
- Uncertainty parameter 0
- Observation arc: 68.67 yr (25,081 d)
- Aphelion: 5.9670 AU
- Perihelion: 4.4441 AU
- Semi-major axis: 5.2056 AU
- Eccentricity: 0.1463
- Orbital period (sidereal): 11.88 yr (4,338 d)
- Mean anomaly: 273.76°
- Mean motion: 0° 4^{m} 58.8^{s} / day
- Inclination: 6.0611°
- Longitude of ascending node: 343.20°
- Argument of perihelion: 35.374°
- Jupiter MOID: 0.2224 AU
- T_{Jupiter}: 2.9670

Physical characteristics
- Mean diameter: 34.53±0.36 km 46.30 km (calculated)
- Synodic rotation period: 12.877±0.016 h
- Geometric albedo: 0.057 (assumed); 0.112±0.020
- Spectral type: C (assumed); V–I = 1.070±0.048
- Absolute magnitude (H): 10.3; 10.4

3794 Sthenelos /ˈ(s)θɛnɪlɒs/ is a mid-sized Jupiter trojan from the Greek camp, approximately 40 kilometers (25 miles) in diameter. It was discovered on 12 October 1985, by American astronomer Carolyn Shoemaker at the Palomar Observatory in California. The presumed C-type asteroid has a rotation period of 12.9 hours. It was named after the Greek warrior Sthenelus from Greek mythology.

== Orbit and classification ==
Sthenelos is a dark Jovian asteroid in a 1:1 orbital resonance with Jupiter. It is located in the leading Greek camp at the Gas Giant's L_{4} Lagrangian point, 60° ahead on its orbit. It is also a non-family asteroid of the Jovian background population. It orbits the Sun at a distance of 4.4–6.0 AU once every 11 years and 11 months (4,338 days; semi-major axis of 5.21 AU). Its orbit has an eccentricity of 0.15 and an inclination of 6° with respect to the ecliptic.

The body's observation arc begins with its first observation as 1949 SA at Heidelberg Observatory in September 1949, or 36 years prior to its official discovery observation at Palomar.

== Physical characteristics ==
Sthenelos is an assumed, carbonaceous C-type asteroid, while most larger Jupiter trojans are D-type asteroids. It has a high V–I color index of 1.07.

=== Rotation period ===
In August 1995, a rotational lightcurve of Sthenelos was obtained from photometric observations by Italian astronomer Stefano Mottola using the Bochum 0.61-metre Telescope at ESO's La Silla Observatory in Chile. Lightcurve analysis gave a well-defined rotation period of 12.877±0.016 hours with a brightness amplitude of 0.27 magnitude (U=3).

=== Diameter and albedo ===
According to the survey carried out by the NEOWISE mission of NASA's Wide-field Infrared Survey Explorer, Sthenelos measures 34.53 kilometers in diameter and its surface has an albedo of 0.112, while the Collaborative Asteroid Lightcurve Link assumes a standard albedo for a carbonaceous asteroid of 0.057 and calculates a diameter of 46.30 kilometers based on an absolute magnitude of 10.4.

== Naming ==
This minor planet was named from Greek mythology after Sthenelus, a Greek warrior and companion of Diomedes during the Trojan War. He stole Aeneas' chariot horses and brought it back to the Greek camp. The official naming citation was published by the Minor Planet Center on 27 August 1988 (M.P.C. 13482).
