= Argeus of Argos =

Mythological king of Argos

In Greek mythology, Argeus (Ancient Greek: Ἀργεύς) was a king of Argos of the Abantiad Dynasty, the son of Megapenthes, and possibly the father of Anaxagoras.

Regnal titles
| Preceded by Megapenthes | King of Argos | Succeeded by Anaxagoras |
