= Anaxagoras (mythology) =

Greek mythological king

In Greek mythology, Anaxagoras (Ancient Greek: Αναξαγόρας) was a king of Argos. He was the son and successor of either King Megapenthes or by the latter's son, King Argeus.

== Family ==
With Megapenthes being his father, Anaxagoras was considered the brother of Iphianeira, wife of Melampus. Anaxagoras fathered Alector, the father of Iphis. In a rare account, he was recounted as the father of Hipponous, the father of Capaneus, one of the Seven Against Thebes.

== Mythology ==
The prince, Anaxagoras' son, suffered from a strange malady and the king offered a reward for anybody that could heal him. Melampus, a local seer, killed an ox and talked to the vultures that came to eat the corpse. The vultures said the last time they had such a feast was when the king made a sacrifice. They told Melampus that the prince had been frightened of the big, bloody knife and the king tossed it aside to calm the child. It had hit a tree and injured a hamadryad, who cursed the prince with the sickness. The hamadryad told Melampus that the boy would be healed if the knife was taken out of the trunk of the tree and boiled, then the rusty water that resulted drunk by the prince. Melampus followed her directions and demanded two thirds of the kingdom for himself, and one third for his brother, Bias. The king ultimately agreed.

When the women of Argos, or just the princesses Proetids, were driven mad by Dionysus, in the reign of Anaxagoras, Melampus was brought in to cure them, but demanded a third of the kingdom as payment. The king refused, but the women became wilder than ever, and he was forced to seek out Melampus again, who this time demanded both a third for himself and another third for his brother Bias. Sometimes, this story is told not of Anaxagoras, but of his grandfather, Proetus. Anaxagoras was succeeded by his son Alector. His house lasted longer than those of Bias and Melampus, and eventually the kingdom was reunited under its last member, Cylarabes.

Regnal titles
Preceded by Argeus	King of Argos	Succeeded by Alector
