= Zeuxippe =

Female name in Greek mythology

In Greek mythology, Zeuxippe (/zuːɡˈzɪpiː/; Ancient Greek: Ζευξίππη, romanized: Zeuxíppē, lit. 'she who yokes horses, from zeugos 'yoke of beasts' / 'pair of horses' and hippos 'horse'') was the name of several women. The name means ""

- Zeuxippe, a naiad nymph of Athens and the mother of Erechtheus, Butes, Procne, Philomela and possibly Teuthras by King Pandion I. She was the sister of Praxithea.
- Zeuxippe, the Athenian naiad-daughter of the river god Eridanos. She was the mother of Butes by Teleon.
- Zeuxippe, a Sicyonian princess as the daughter of King Lamedon (son of Coronus) and Pheno. She was the wife of Sicyon and the mother of Chthonophyle.
- Zeuxippe, daughter of Hippocoon and the mother of Oicles and Amphalces with Antiphates.
- Zeuxippe, daughter of Athamas and possibly the mother of Ptous by Apollo.
- Zeuxippe, a Trojan queen as the possible wife of King Laomedon and the mother of his children.
