= Argos, Peloponnese =

City in Argolis, Greece

Argos Άργος
- Municipal unit
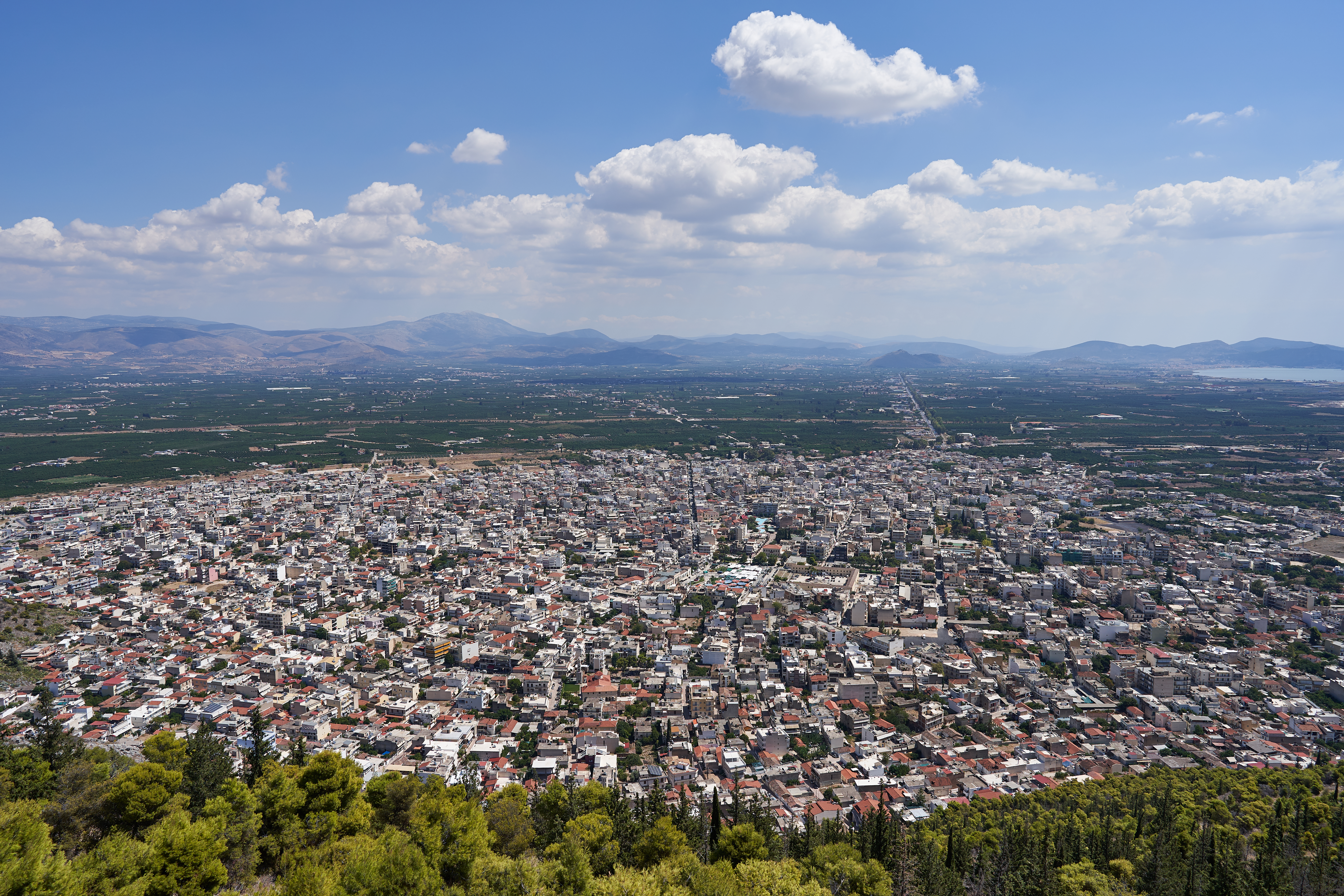
- Panoramic view of Argos

- Seal

- Location within the regional unit

- Location within Greece
- Coordinates: 37°37′N 22°43′E
- Country: Greece
- Administrative region: Peloponnese
- Regional unit: Argolis
- Municipality: Argos-Mykines

Area
  - Municipal unit: 138.138 km^{2} (53.335 sq mi)
- Elevation: 40 m (130 ft)

Population (2021)
  - Municipal unit: 26,069
  - Municipal unit density: 188.72/km^{2} (488.77/sq mi)
  - Community: 21,891
- Time zone: UTC+2 (EET)
  - Summer (DST): UTC+3 (EEST)
- Postal code: 21200
- Area code: 2751
- Vehicle registration: AP

Argos (/ˈɑːrɡɒs, -ɡəs/; Greek: Άργος [ˈarɣos]; Ancient: Ἄργος [árɡos]) is a city and a former municipality in the Peloponnese region of Greece, and one of the oldest continuously inhabited cities in the world. It is the largest city in Argolis, having nearly twice the population of its capital, Nafplio.

Since the 2011 local government reform it has been part of the municipality of Argos-Mykines, of which it is a municipal unit. The municipal unit has an area of 138.138 km^{2}. It is 11 kilometres (7 miles) from Nafplio, which was its historic harbour. A settlement of great antiquity, Argos has been continuously inhabited as at least a substantial village for the past 7,000 years.

A resident of the city of Argos is known as an Argive (/ˈɑːrɡaɪv/ AR-ghyve, /-dʒaɪv/ -jyve; Ancient Greek: Ἀργεῖος). However, this term is also used to refer to those ancient Greeks generally who assaulted the city of Troy during the Trojan War; the term is more widely applied by the Homeric bards.

Numerous ancient monuments can be found in the city today. Agriculture is the mainstay of the local economy.

== Etymology ==
There are several proposed etyma. The name is associated with the legendary Argus, the third king of the city in ancient times, who renamed it after himself, thus replacing its older name Phoronikon Asty (Φορωνικόν Άστυ, "Citadel of Phoroneus"). Both the personal name and placename are linked to the word argós (αργός), which meant "white" or "shining"; possibly, this had to do with the visual impression given of the Argolic plain during harvest time. According to Strabo, the name could have even originated from the word agrós (αγρός) 'field' by metathesis of the consonants.

== History ==
=== Antiquity ===
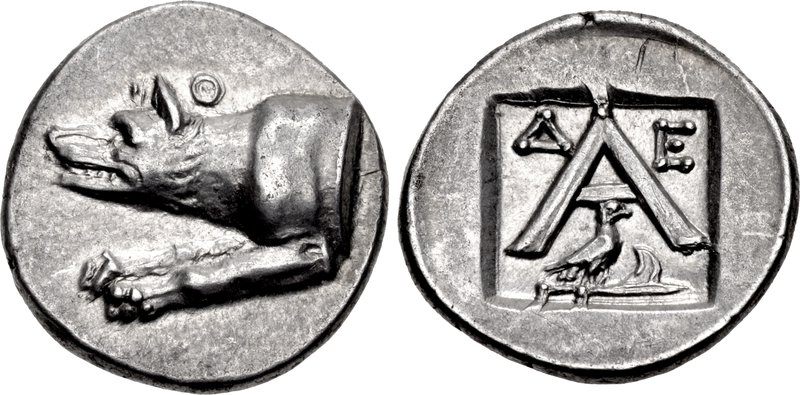
Triobol of Argos, struck c. 270–250 BC. Obv.: forepart of a wolf, alluding to Apollo Lykeios, the patron-god of the city; rev.: large A (for Argos) within an incuse square.

Herodotus first recorded the myth of the traditional story of Argos being the origin of the ancient Macedonian royal house of the Argead dynasty (Greek: Ἀργεάδαι, Argeádai) of Philip II and Alexander the Great. As a strategic location on the fertile plain of Argolis, Argos was a major stronghold during the Mycenaean era. In classical times, Argos was a powerful rival of Sparta for dominance over the Peloponnese, but was eventually shunned by other Greek city-states after remaining neutral during the Greco-Persian Wars.

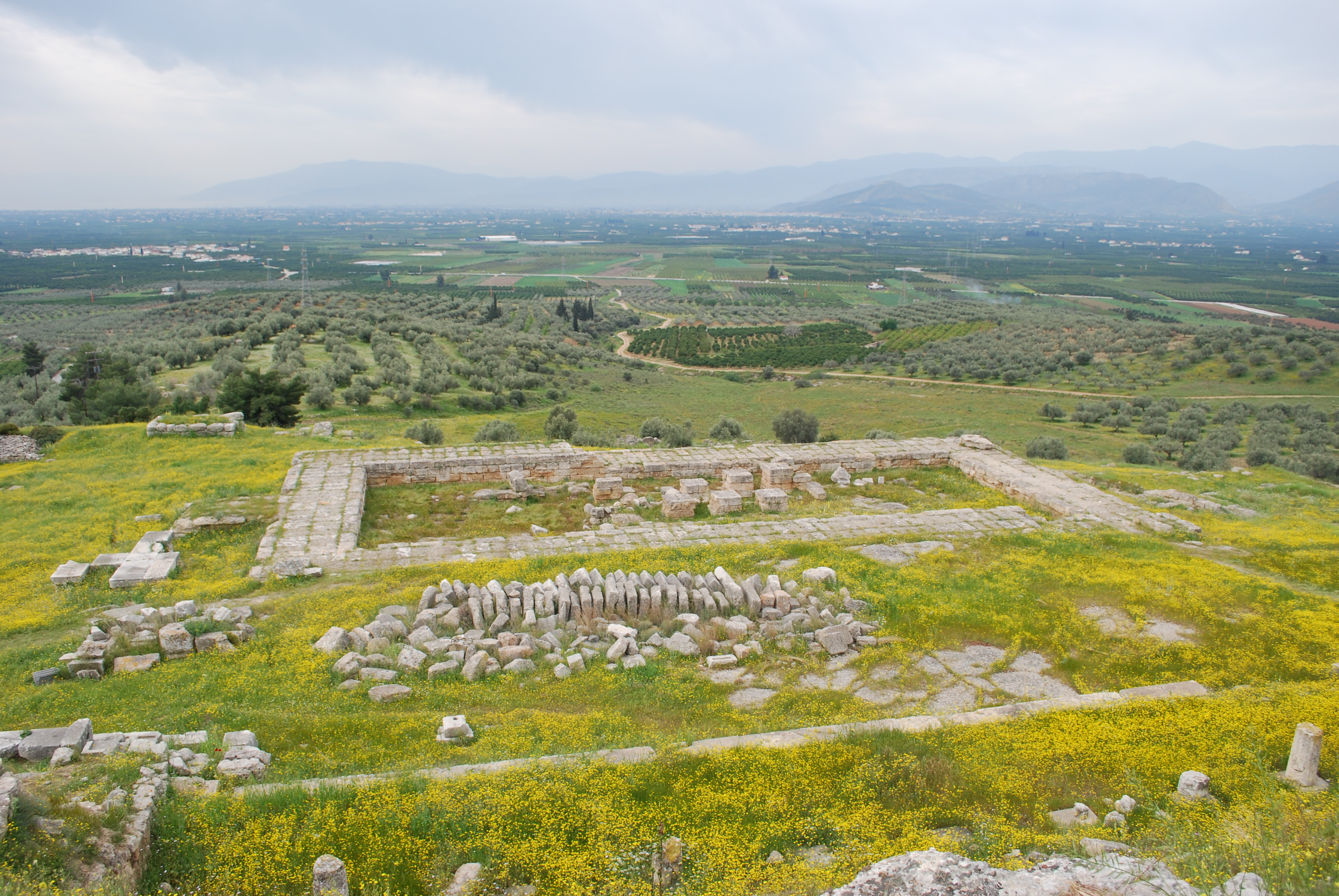
The Heraion of Argos

Ancient Peloponnese

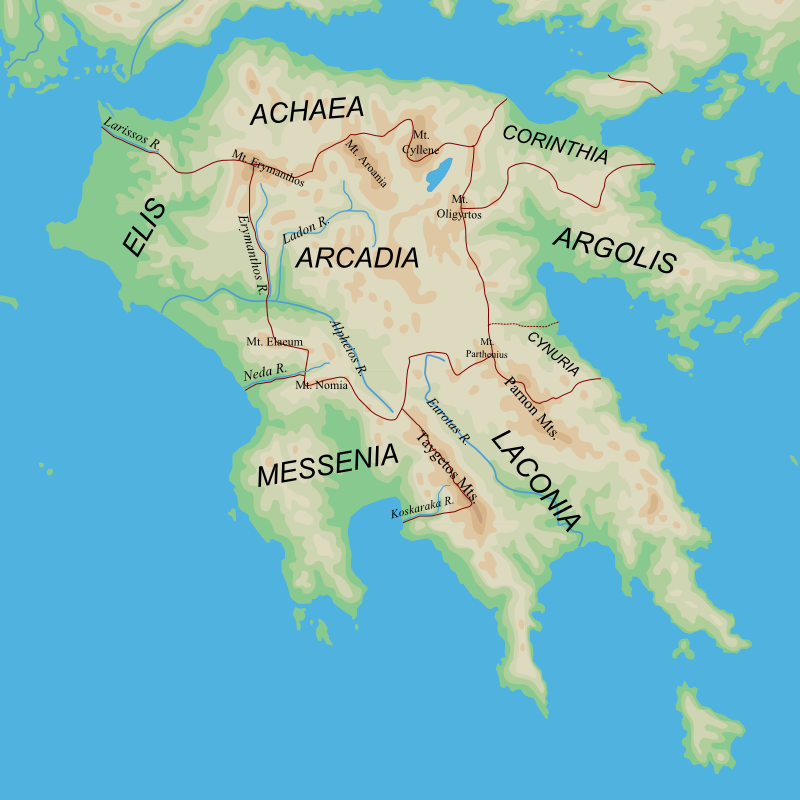
Ancient regions of Peloponnese (southern mainland Greece).

There is evidence of continuous settlement in the area starting with a village about 7,000 years ago in the late Neolithic, located on the foot of Aspida hill. Since that time, Argos has been continually inhabited at the same geographical location.

The city is located at a rather propitious area, among Nemea, Corinth and Arcadia. It also benefitted from its proximity to lake Lerna, which, at the time, was at a distance of one kilometre from the south end of Argos.

=== Mycenaean Argos ===
Argos was a major stronghold of Mycenaean times, and along with the neighbouring acropolis of Mycenae and Tiryns became a very early settlement because of its commanding positions in the midst of the fertile plain of Argolis.

=== Archaic Argos ===
Argos experienced its greatest period of expansion and power under the energetic 7th century BC ruler King Pheidon. Under Pheidon, Argos regained sway over the cities of the Argolid and challenged Sparta's dominance of the Peloponnese. Spartan dominance is thought to have been interrupted following the Battle of Hyssiae in 669–668 BC, in which Argive troops defeated the Spartans in a hoplite battle. During the time of its greatest power, the city boasted a pottery and bronze sculpturing school, pottery workshops, tanneries and clothes producers. Moreover, at least 25 celebrations took place in the city, in addition to a regular local products exhibition. A sanctuary dedicated to Hera was also found at the same spot where the monastery of Panagia Katekrymeni is located today. Pheidon also extended Argive influence throughout Greece, taking control of the Olympic Games away from the citizens of Elis and appointing himself organizer during his reign. Pheidon is also thought to have introduced reforms for standard weight and measures in Argos, a theory further reinforced with the unearthing of six "spits" of iron in an Argive Heraion, possibly remainders of a dedication from Pheidon.

=== Classical Argos ===
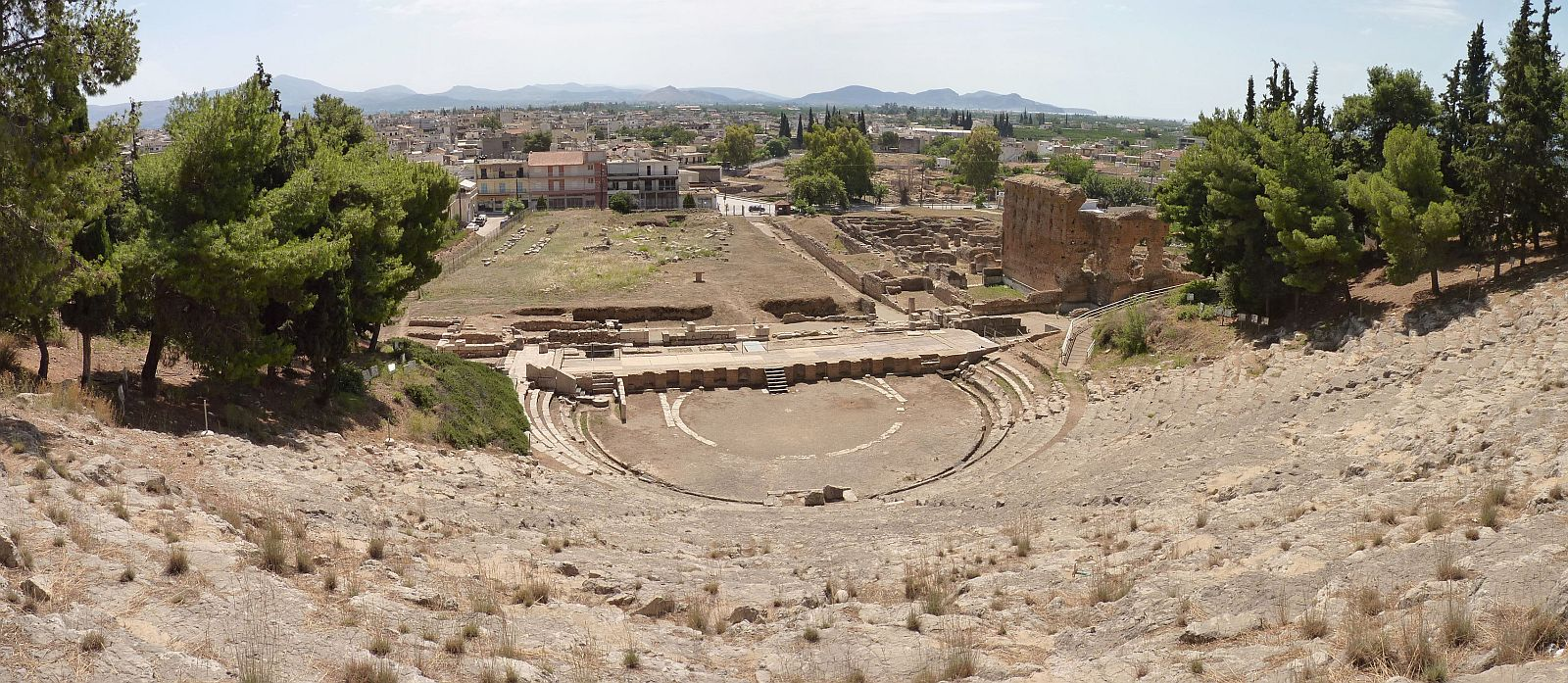
View of the ancient theatre

In 494 BC, Argos suffered a crushing defeat at the hands of its regional rival, Sparta, at the Battle of Sepeia. Following this defeat, Herodotus tells that the city suffered a form of stasis. The political chaos is thought to have resulted in a democratic transition in the city. Argos did not participate in the Hellenic Alliance against the Persian Invasion of 480 BC. This resulted in a period of diplomatic isolation, although there is evidence of an Argive alliance with Tegea prior to 462 BC.

In 462 BC, Argos joined a tripartite alliance with Athens and Thessaly. This alliance was somewhat dysfunctional, however, and the Argives are only thought to have provided marginal contributions to the alliance at the Battle of Oenoe and Tanagra. For example, only 1,000 Argive hoplites are thought to have fought alongside the Athenians at the Battle of Tanagra. Following the allies' defeat at Tanagra in 457 BC, the alliance began to fall apart, resulting in its dissolution in 451 BC.

Argos remained neutral or the ineffective ally of Athens during the Archidamian War between Sparta and Athens. Argos's neutrality resulted in a rise of its prestige among other Greek cities, and Argos used this political capital to organize and lead an alliance against Sparta and Athens in 421 BC. This alliance included Mantinea, Corinth, Elis, Thebes, Argos, and eventually Athens. This alliance fell apart, however, after the allied loss at the Battle of Mantinea in 418 BC. This defeat, combined with the raiding of the Argolid by the Epidaurians, resulted in political instability and an eventual oligarchic coup in 417 BC. Although democracy was restored within a year, Argos was left permanently weakened by this coup. This weakening led to a loss of power, which in turn led to the shift of commercial focus from the Ancient Agora to the eastern side of the city, delimited by Danaou and Agiou Konstadinou streets.

Argos played a minor role in the Corinthian Wars against Sparta, and for a short period of time considered uniting with Corinth to form an expanded Argolid state. For a brief period of time, the two poleis combined, but Corinth quickly rebelled against Argive domination, and Argos returned to its traditional boundaries. After this, Argos remained an important but politically inconsistent polis in the Peloponnese. Although it was counted among the four major Greek cities by Isokrates in 346 BC, alongside Athens, Sparta, and Thebes, this was primarily due to its symbolic status as the legendary birthplace of the Argead dynasty, the royal house of Macedon. In reality, Argos was militarily and politically weakened, plagued by internal strife and civic violence throughout the 4th century BC.

In the 350s BC, Argos joined Messene and Megalopolis in resisting renewed Spartan aggression, particularly during Archidamus III’s campaigns against the anti-Spartan alliance. The Argives participated in defending Megalopolis but quickly withdrew after a defeat at Orneai and the arrival of Theban reinforcements, reflecting a broader pattern of military reluctance and limited effectiveness.

After the Peace of Philocrates in 346 BC, Argos increasingly engaged with Philip II of Macedon. While Demosthenes accused Argive leaders of collaborating with Macedon, this relationship appears to have been driven more by strategic concerns than ideological alignment. Macedonian sympathizers, including Myrtis, Teledamos, and Mnaseas, held power in the city by 330 BC. However, Argos maintained a cautious neutrality during key conflicts, such as the Battle of Chaironeia in 338 BC, where it sent no troops to support either side.

Despite Argos’s neutral stance, Philip II rewarded the polis in 337 BC with Spartan territory as part of a broader reordering of Peloponnesian borders intended to weaken Sparta and reward its rivals. Argos received either the contested region of Thyreatis, the eastern seaboard of Mount Parnon, or both, though the exact territorial allocation remains debated. This expansion made Argos one of the largest territorial states in the Peloponnese, controlling an area reaching up to 1,400 km².

The decision to grant Argos territory was likely influenced by its symbolic connection to the Argeads and its longstanding enmity with Sparta. However, Philip’s limited trust in Argos, due to its earlier alliance with Athens in 342 BC and its absence at Chaironeia, may have tempered the extent of his generosity. Later Macedonian kings, such as Antigonus III Doson, would reaffirm Argive control over disputed areas like Zarax.

=== Democracy in Classical Argos ===
Argos was a democracy for most of the classical period, with only a brief hiatus between 418 and 416. Democracy was first established after a disastrous defeat by the Spartans at the Battle of Sepeia in 494. So many Argives were killed in the battle that a revolution ensued, in which previously disenfranchised outsiders were included in the state for the first time.

Argive democracy included an Assembly (called the aliaia), a Council (the bola), and another body called 'The Eighty,' whose precise responsibilities are obscure. Magistrates served six-month terms of office, with few exceptions, and were audited at the end of their terms. There is some evidence that ostracism was practiced.

=== Hellenistic Argos ===
Following the death of Alexander the Great in 323 BC, Argos joined the anti-Macedonian coalition during the Lamian War alongside Athens, Aitolia, Messenia, and others. This shift from its previous ambivalence under Philip II reflected the rise of anti-Macedonian sentiment and leadership within the city. However, Argos’s commitment was limited; like other Peloponnesian poleis, it showed little resolve in sustained military engagement, and after early enthusiasm, returned to a pattern of defensive caution.

In 318 BC, when Polyperchon, the regent of Macedon, issued a diagramma ordering the restoration of regimes as they had been under Philip II and Alexander. He addressed a specific letter to Argos and the other cities, urging the exile or execution of pro-Antipatrid leaders and the confiscation of their property. The fact that Argos was the only polis explicitly named underscores its symbolic significance as the legendary homeland of the Argead dynasty. The Argive assembly initially aligned itself with Polyperchon and his son Alexandrer; however, in the summer of 316 BC, Cassander installed Apollonides as the strategos of Argos and garrisoned the city. While Apollonides campaigned in Arcadia the following year, the Argives invited Polyperchon’s son Alexander to retake the city. Apollonides's campaign was successful (he captured Stymphalus in a night attack), but was cut short. Upon hearing of the Argives' treachery, Apollonides returned to Argos enacted a brutal purge: approximately 500 supporters of Polyperchon were burned alive in the prytaneion. The conspirators not burned alive were either exiled or put to death. This event was only the second major purge in Argive history after the infamous Scytalism (Σκυταλισμός, Skytalismós) of 370 BC and may have eliminated as much as 5% of the hoplite citizen class.

This “decapitation” of the political leadership likely contributed to Argos’s declining engagement in inter-polis affairs and its later detachment from emerging federal formations such as the Achaean League. Cassander likely certainly installed a pro-Macedonian oligarchy afterward, which remained in control until 303 BC when Argos joined several northern and central Peloponnesian poleis which defected to Demetrius. The liberation of Argos was mythologized by the Argives themselves in inscriptions that attributed the city’s freedom to divine intervention, notably from Apollo, while omitting Demetrius entirely.

The political status of Argos after the Antigonid defeat at the Battle of Ipsus in 301 BC is unclear. While Plutarch refers to Demetrius recovering various Peloponnesian cities that had turned against him, he does not identify them by name, so Argos’s inclusion remains speculative. Other poleis in the Argolic Akte like as Troizen were likely brought back under Demetrius’s influence in 295 BC. Troizen’s later contribution of ships and troops to his Asian expedition in 286 BC suggests that at least some level of Antigonid control or cooperation persisted. After Demetrius’s death, the broader control of the Argolic cities becomes difficult to trace. It is uncertain whether Gonatas inherited authority over these areas. Troizen did continue to host a Macedonian garrison into the early 270s, which was expelled during a campaign by the Spartan regent Cleonymus. However, no comparable military activity is recorded for Argos during this time.

By 272 BC, during the Epirote king Pyrrhus’s invasion of the Peloponnese, Argos appears to have been autonomous but politically fractured. While Pyrrhus was campaigning in the Peloponnese, the Argives invited him to intervene in a civic dispute. Since Antigonus Gonatas was approaching too, Pyrrhus hastened to enter the city with his army by stealth, only to find the place crowded with hostile troops. During the confused Battle of Argos in the narrow city streets, Pyrrhus was trapped. While he was fighting an Argive soldier, the soldier's old mother, who was watching from a rooftop, threw a tile which knocked him from his horse and broke part of his spine, paralyzing him. Whether he was alive or not after the blow is unknown, but his death was assured when a Macedonian soldier named Zopyrus, though frightened by the look on the face of the unconscious king, hesitantly and ineptly beheaded his motionless body. This story is later recounted by Plutarch in his Life of Pyrrhus.

=== Roman and Byzantine period ===
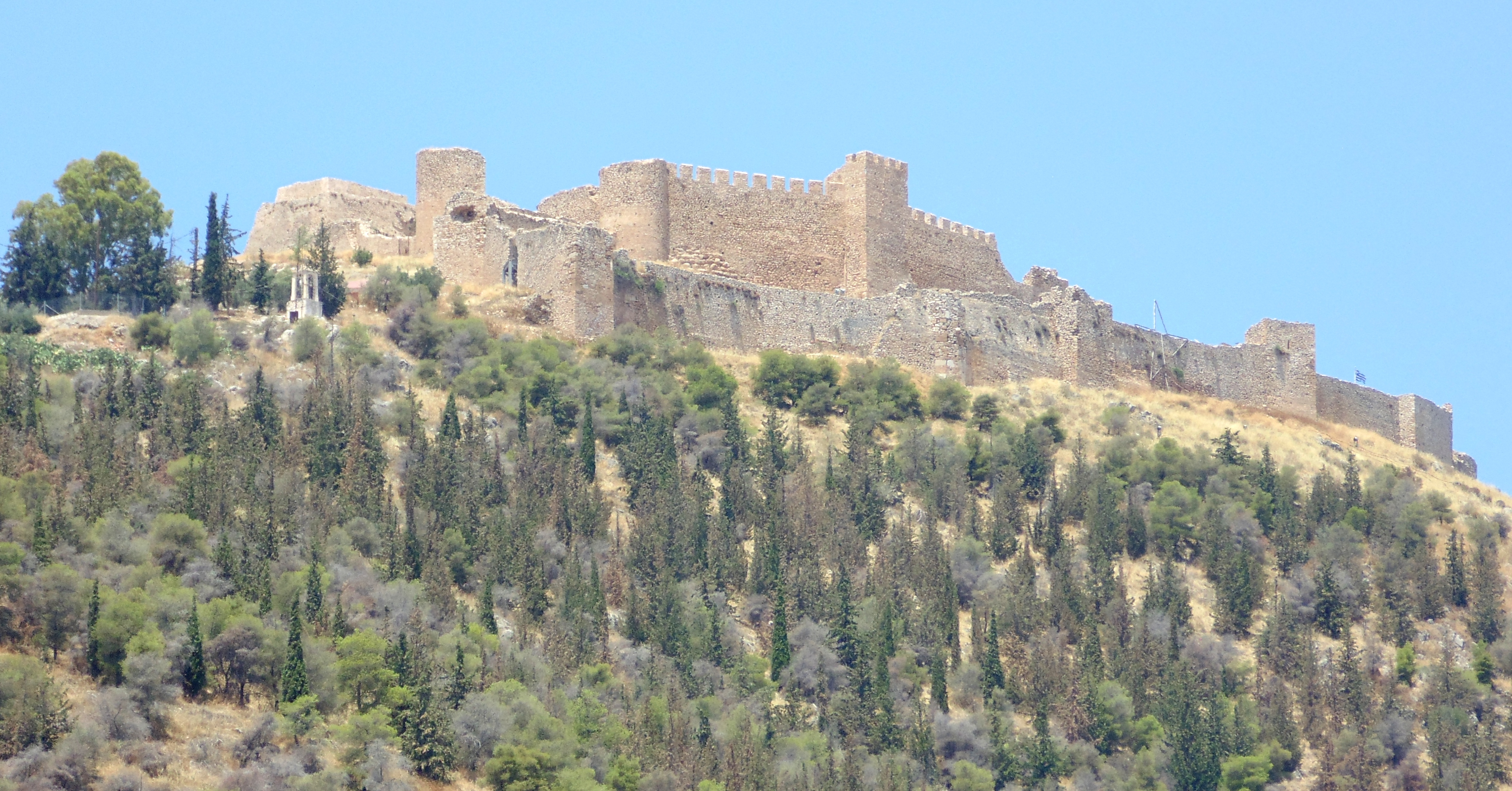
The castle on Larissa Hill

Under Roman rule, Argos was part of the province of Achaea. While prosperous during the early principate, Argos along with much of Greece and the Balkans experienced disasters during the Crisis of the 3rd Century when external threats and internal revolts left the Empire in turmoil. During Gallienus's reign, marauding bands of Goths and Heruli sailed down from the Black Sea in AD 267 and devastated the Greek coastline and interior. Athens, Sparta, Corinth, Thebes and Argos were all sacked. Gallienus finally cut off their retreat north and destroyed them with great slaughter at Naissus in Moesia.

With the death of the last emperor over a unified Empire, Theodosius I, the Visigoths under their leader Alaric I descended into Greece in 396–397 A.D., sacking and pillaging as they went. Neither the eastern or western Roman warlords, Rufinus (consul) or Stilicho, made an effective stand against them due to the political situation between them. Athens and Corinth were both sacked. While the exact level of destruction for Argos is disputed due to the conflicting nature of the ancient sources, the level of damage to the city and people was considerable. Stilicho finally landed in western Greece and forced the Visigoths north of Epirus. Sites said to have been destroyed in Argos include the Hypostyle hall, parts of the agora, the odeion, and the Aphrodision. In the late 7th century, it became part of the Theme of Hellas, and later of the Theme of the Peloponnese.

=== Crusader and Ottoman rule ===
In the aftermath of the Fourth Crusade, the Crusaders captured the castle built on Larisa Hill, the site of the ancient acropolis, and the area became part of the lordship of Argos and Nauplia. In 1388, it was sold to the Republic of Venice, but was taken by the Despot of the Morea Theodore I Palaiologos before the Venetians could take control of the city; he sold it anyway to them in 1394. The Crusaders established a Latin bishopric. Venetian rule lasted until 1463, when the Ottomans captured the city.

In 1397, the Ottomans plundered Argos, carrying off part of the population, to sell as slaves. The Venetians repopulated the town and region with Albanian settlers, granting them long-term agrarian tax exemptions. Together with the Greeks of Argos, they supplied stratioti troops to the armies of Venice. Throughout the Ottoman–Venetian wars, many Albanians died or were captured in service to the Venetians; at Nafpaktos, Nafplio, Argos, Methoni, Koroni and Pylos. Furthermore, 8,000 Albanian stratioti, most of them along with their families, left the Peloponnese to continue their military service under the Republic of Venice or the Kingdom of Naples. At the end of the Ottoman–Venetian wars, a large number of Albanians had fled from the Peloponnese to Sicily. Some historians consider the French military term "argoulet" to derive from the Greek "argetes", or inhabitant of Argos, as a large number of French stratioti came from the plain of Argos.

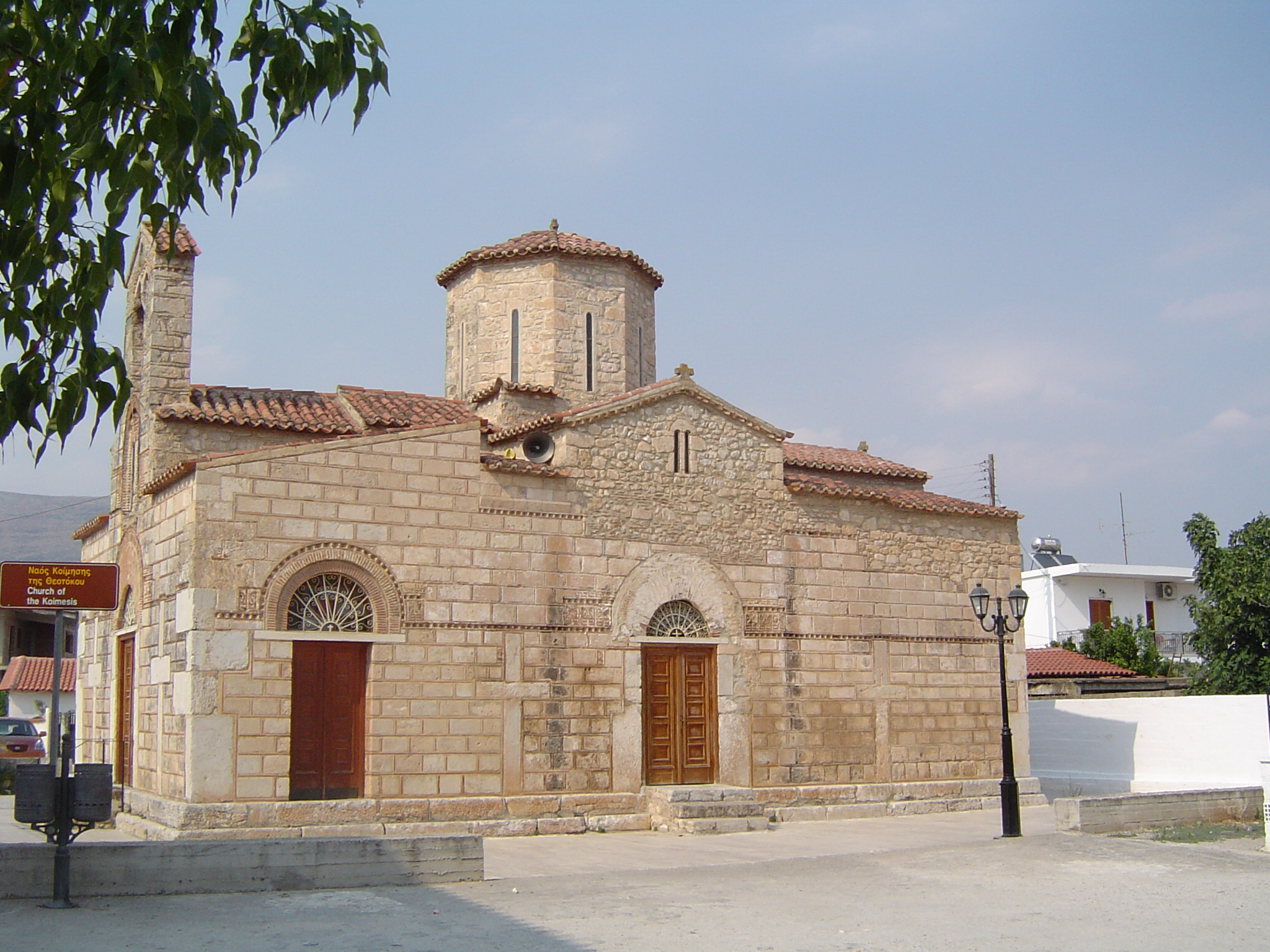
The church of the Kimisis (Dormition) of the Virgin in Neo Ireo

During Ottoman rule, Argos was divided in four mahalas, or quarters; the Greek (Rûm) mahala, Liepur mahala, Bekir Efenti mahala and Karamoutza or Besikler mahala, respectively corresponding to what is now the northeastern, the northwestern, the southwestern and southeastern parts of the city. The Greek mahala was also called the "quarter of the unfaithful of Archos town" in Turkish documents, whereas Liepur mahala (the quarter of the rabbits) was composed mostly of Albanian emigrants and well-reputed families. Karamoutza mahala was home to the most prominent Turks and boasted a mosque (modern-day church of Agios Konstadinos), a Turkish cemetery, Ali Nakin Bei's serail, hammams and a Turkish school. It is also at this period when the open market of the city is first organised on the site north to Kapodistrias's barracks, at the same spot where it is held in modern times. A mosque would have existed there, too, according to the city planning most Ottoman cities followed.

Argos grew exponentially during this time, with its sprawl being unregulated and without planning. As French explorer Pouqueville noted, "its houses are not aligned, without order, scattered all over the place, divided by home gardens and uncultivated areas". Liepur mahala appears to have been the most organised, having the best layout, while Bekir mahala and Karamoutza mahala were the most labyrinthine. However, all quarters shared the same type of streets; firstly, they all had main streets which were wide, busy and public roads meant to allow for communication between neighbourhoods (typical examples are, to a great extent, modern-day Korinthou, Nafpliou and Tripoleos streets). Secondary streets were also common in all four quarters since they lead to the interior of each mahala, having a semi-public character, whereas the third type of streets referred to dead-end private alleys used specifically by families to access their homes. Remnants of this city layout can be witnessed even today, as Argos still preserves several elements of this Ottoman type style, particularly with its long and complicated streets, its narrow alleys and its densely constructed houses.

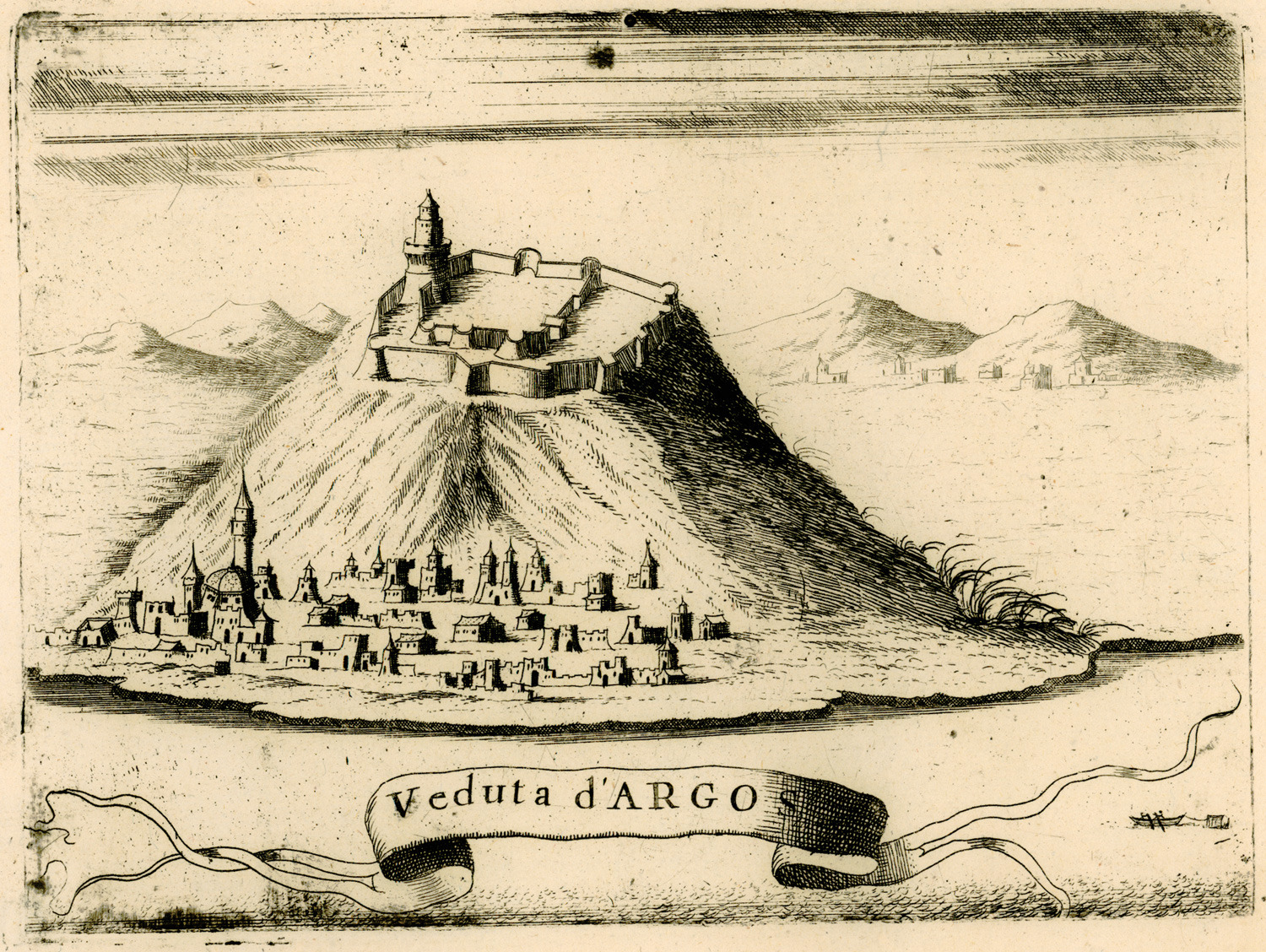
Illustration of Argos by Vincenzo Coronelli, 1688

=== Independence and modern history ===
With the exception of a period of Venetian domination in 1687–1715, Argos remained in Ottoman hands until the beginning of the Greek War of Independence in 1821, when wealthy Ottoman families moved to nearby Nafplio due to its stronger walling.

At that time, as part of the general uprising, many local governing bodies were formed in different parts of the country, and the "Consulate of Argos" was proclaimed on 28 March 1821, under the Peloponnesian Senate. It had a single head of state, Stamatellos Antonopoulos, styled "Consul", between 28 March and 26 May 1821.

Later, Argos accepted the authority of the unified Provisional Government of the First National Assembly at Epidaurus, and eventually became part of the Kingdom of Greece. With the coming of governor Ioannis Kapodistrias, the city underwent efforts of modernisation. Being an agricultural village, the need for urban planning was vital. For this reason, in 1828, Kapodistrias himself appointed mechanic Stamatis Voulgaris as the creator of a city plan which would offer Argos big streets, squares and public spaces. However, both Voulgaris and, later, French architect de Borroczun's plans were not well received by the locals, with the result that the former had to be revised by Zavos. Ultimately, none of the plans were fully implemented. Still, the structural characteristics of de Borroczun's plan can be found in the city today, despite obvious proof of pre-revolutionary layout, such as the unorganised urban sprawl testified in the area from Inachou street to the point where the railway tracks can be found today.

In 1829, Argos housed the Fourth National Assembly, an important event in modern Greek history, which made major changes like establishing the Senate of Greece and adopting the phoenix as the country's first currency.

After talks concerning the intentions of the Greek government to move the Greek capital from Nafplio to Athens, discussions regarding the possibility of Argos also being a candidate as the potential new capital became more frequent, with supporters of the idea claiming that, unlike Athens, Argos was naturally protected by its position and benefited from a nearby port (Nafplio). Moreover, it was maintained that construction of public buildings would be difficult in Athens, given that most of the land was owned by the Greek church, meaning that a great deal of expropriation would have to take place. On the contrary, Argos did not face a similar problem, having large available areas for this purpose. In the end, the proposition of the Greek capital being moved to Argos was rejected by the father of king Otto, Ludwig, who insisted in making Athens the capital, something which eventually happened in 1834.

During the German occupation, Argos airfield was frequently attacked by Allied forces. One of the raids was so large that it resulted in the bombing of the city on 14 October 1943, with the casualties of about 100 dead Argives and several casualties, and 75 of the Germans. The bombing started from the airfield heading southeast, hitting the monastery of Katakrykmeni and several areas of the city, up to the railway station.

== Mythology ==
The mythological kings of Argos are (in order): Inachus, Phoroneus, Apis, Argus, Criasus, (Phorbas, Triopas is sometimes between Criasus and Iasus in some sources), Iasus, Agenor, (Crotopus and Sthenelus was between Agenor and Gelanor in some sources), Gelanor AKA Pelasgus, Danaus, Lynceus, Abas, Proetus, Acrisius, Perseus, Megapenthes, (Argeus and Anaxagoras comes after in some sources). An alternative version supplied by Tatian of the original 17 consecutive kings of Argos includes Apis, Argios, Kriasos and Phorbas between Argus and Triopas, explaining the apparent unrelation of Triopas to Argus.

The city of Argos was believed to be the birthplace of the mythological character Perseus, the son of the god Zeus and Danaë, who was the daughter of the king of Argos, Acrisius.

After the original 17 kings of Argos, there were three kings ruling Argos at the same time (see Anaxagoras), one descended from Bias, one from Melampus, and one from Anaxagoras. Melampus was succeeded by his son Mantius, then Oicles, and Amphiaraus, and his house of Melampus lasted down to the brothers Alcmaeon and Amphilochus.

Anaxagoras was succeeded by his son Alector, and then Iphis. Iphis left his kingdom to his nephew Sthenelus, the son of his brother Capaneus.

Bias was succeeded by his son Talaus, and then by his son Adrastus who, with Amphiaraus, commanded the disastrous war of the Seven against Thebes. Adrastus bequeathed the kingdom to his son, Aegialeus, who was subsequently killed in the war of the Epigoni. Diomedes, grandson of Adrastus through his son-in-law Tydeus and daughter Deipyle, replaced Aegialeus and was King of Argos during the Trojan war. This house lasted longer than those of Anaxagoras and Melampus, and eventually the kingdom was reunited under its last member, Cyanippus, son of Aegialeus, soon after the exile of Diomedes.

Plutarch writes that the Argives called Castor the "Associate-founder" (mixarchagetas; "μιξαρχαγέτας") and believed that he was buried in Argive territory.

== Ecclesiastical history ==
After Christianity became established in Argos, the first bishop documented in extant written records is Genethlius, who in 448 AD took part in the synod called by Archbishop Flavian of Constantinople that deposed Eutyches from his priestly office and excommunicated him. The next bishop of Argos, Onesimus, was at the 451 Council of Chalcedon. His successor, Thales, was a signatory of the letter that the bishops of the Roman province of Hellas sent in 458 to Byzantine Emperor Leo I the Thracian to protest the killing of Proterius of Alexandria. Bishop Ioannes was at the Third Council of Constantinople in 680, and Theotimus at the Photian Council of Constantinople (879). The local see is today the Greek Orthodox Metropolis of Argolis.

Under 'Frankish' Crusader rule, Argos became a Latin Church bishopric in 1212, which lasted as a residential see until Argos was taken by the Ottoman Empire in 1463 but would be revived under the second Venetian rule in 1686. Today the diocese is a Catholic titular see.

== Geography ==
=== Topography ===
Argos consists of a plain of approximately 250 km² with mountains nearby in the West from which the rivers run down. The site has two prominent hills: Larisa and Aspida.

=== Subdivisions ===
The former municipality and current municipal unit, is subdivided into the following communes and their respective settlements:

Commune	Settlements
Argos	Akova, Argos, Kokla, Timenio
Dalamanara	Dalamanara
Elliniko	Elliniko, Krya Vrysi, Kryoneri, Tourniki, Zogka
Ira	Ira
Inachos	Inachos, Tristrato
Kefalari	Kefalari, Magoula
Kourtaki	Kourtaki
Lalouka	Lalouka
Pyrgella	Pyrgella

=== Climate ===
Argos has a hot-summer Mediterranean climate (Köppen: Csa). It is one of the hottest places in Greece during summer. Argos has generally cold winters, although due to the local climate, some winter months may have little rainfall. The weather of Argos includes an abundant amount of sunny days throughout the year, even in the winter. Temperatures below zero degrees Celsius or 32 degrees Fahrenheit are recorded mostly in the nightly hours during the winter months. Snowfalls are generally rare there, although not unheard of. The most recent significant snowfall in Argos occurred in early January 2017 during a large European cold wave. There is also a degree of variation in the annual rainfall volumes in Argos, as rainfall in Argos usually is between 300 and 800 millimeters or 11.8 to 31.5 inches depending the year.

Climate data for Argos (1980–2010)
Month	Jan	Feb	Mar	Apr	May	Jun	Jul	Aug	Sep	Oct	Nov	Dec	Year
Mean daily maximum °C (°F)	14.6 (58.3)	14.7 (58.5)	17.4 (63.3)	21.3 (70.3)	26.5 (79.7)	31.4 (88.5)	34.0 (93.2)	33.7 (92.7)	29.7 (85.5)	24.7 (76.5)	19.2 (66.6)	15.5 (59.9)	23.6 (74.4)
Daily mean °C (°F)	8.2 (46.8)	8.4 (47.1)	10.9 (51.6)	14.9 (58.8)	20.3 (68.5)	25.1 (77.2)	27.5 (81.5)	26.8 (80.2)	22.6 (72.7)	18.0 (64.4)	13.0 (55.4)	9.6 (49.3)	17.1 (62.8)
Mean daily minimum °C (°F)	3.0 (37.4)	2.9 (37.2)	4.3 (39.7)	6.7 (44.1)	10.5 (50.9)	14.0 (57.2)	16.7 (62.1)	16.8 (62.2)	14.2 (57.6)	11.5 (52.7)	7.7 (45.9)	4.8 (40.6)	9.4 (49.0)
Average precipitation mm (inches)	66.5 (2.62)	52.5 (2.07)	52.2 (2.06)	33.7 (1.33)	18.7 (0.74)	8.9 (0.35)	9.1 (0.36)	13.0 (0.51)	20.3 (0.80)	44.3 (1.74)	82.5 (3.25)	69.7 (2.74)	471.4 (18.57)
Average precipitation days	10.3	10.1	9.7	8.6	6.2	3.0	2.1	2.5	5.0	6.9	9.4	12.2	86
Average relative humidity (%)	75.3	73.6	72.2	68.6	60.5	54.0	52.5	56.6	65.8	71.8	76.7	77.3	67.1
Source: Hellenic National Meteorological Agency

== Characteristics ==
=== Orientation ===
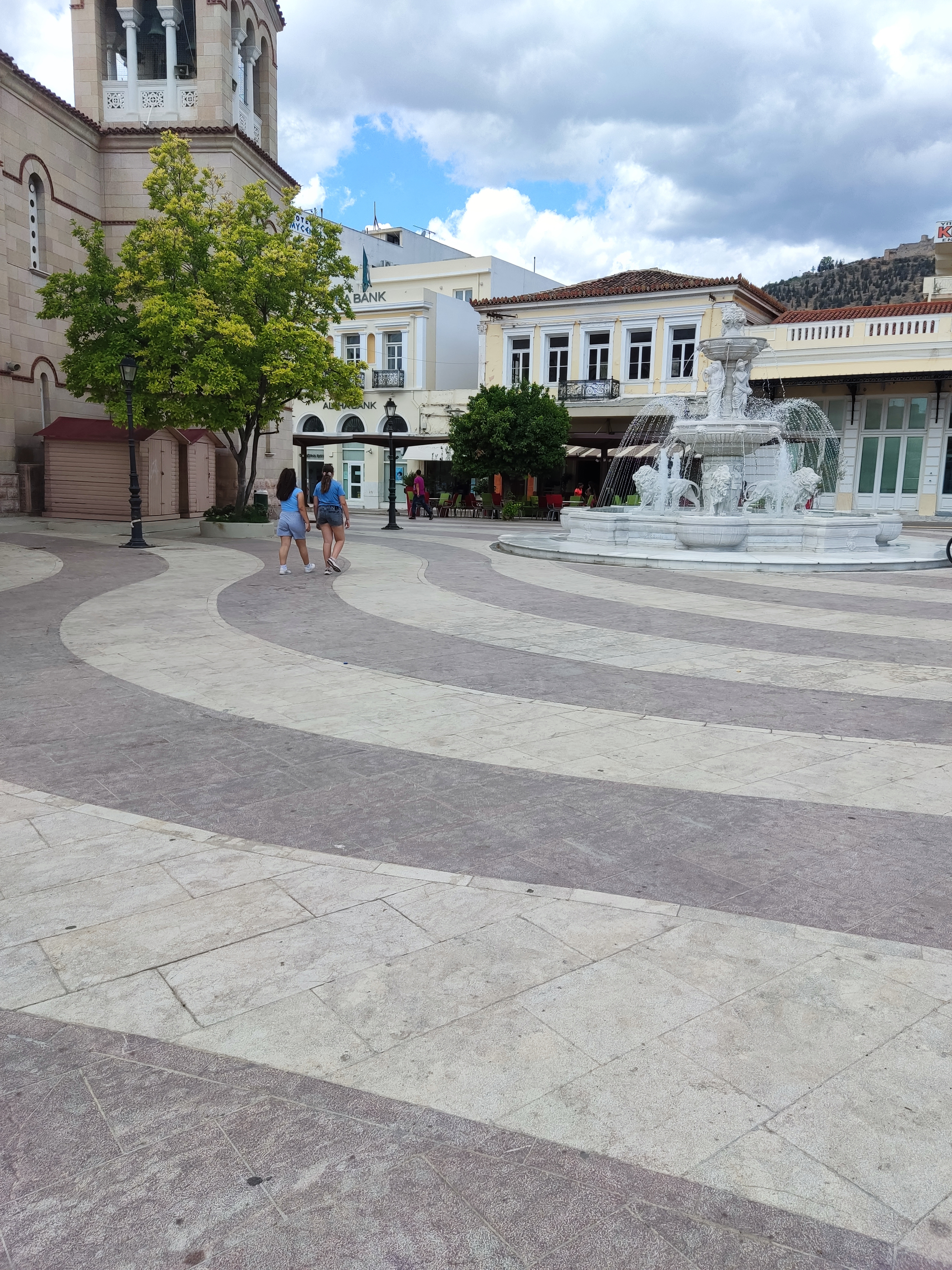
The fountain of Argos was unveiled in 2022.

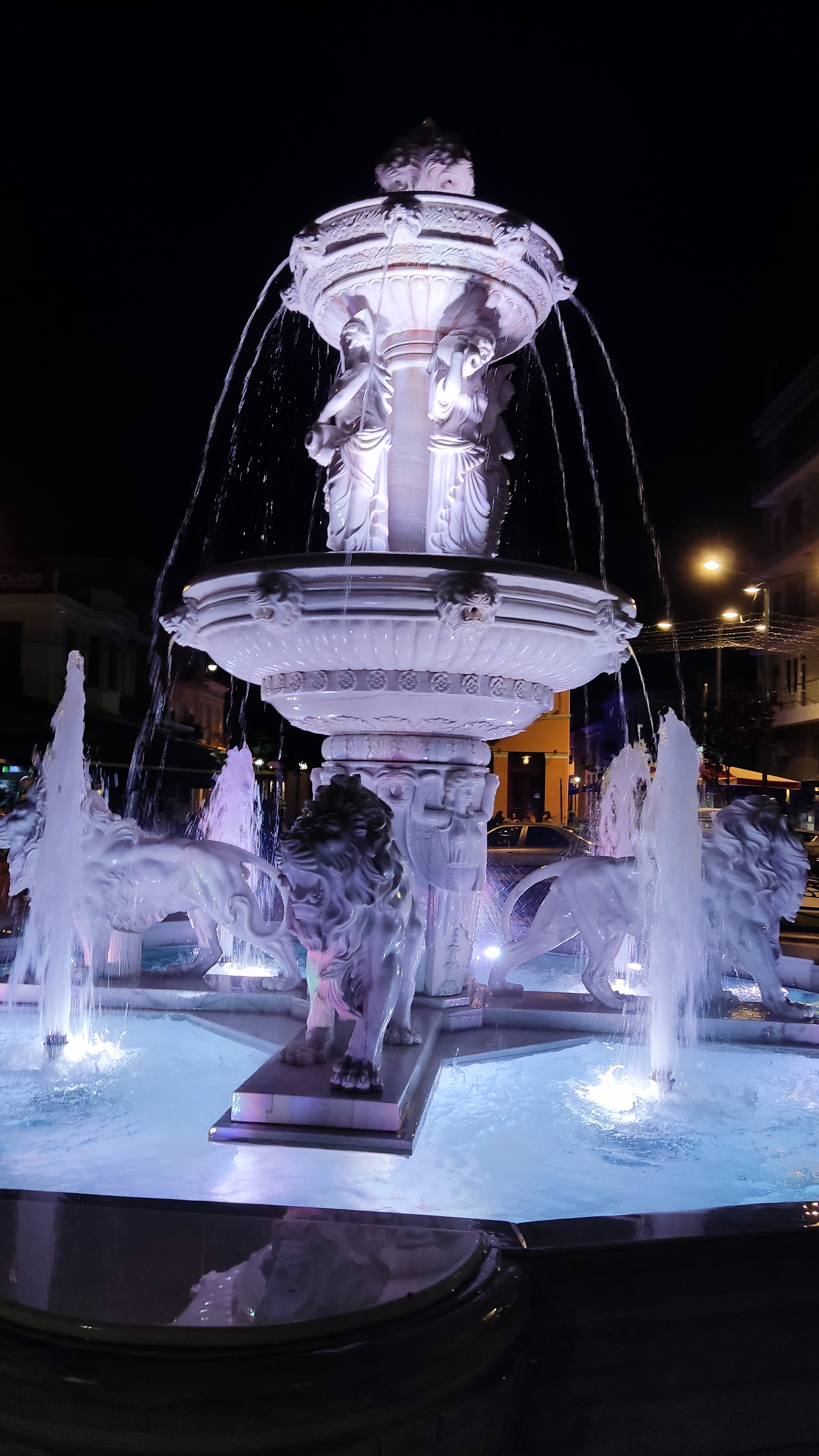
The Argos fountain at night.

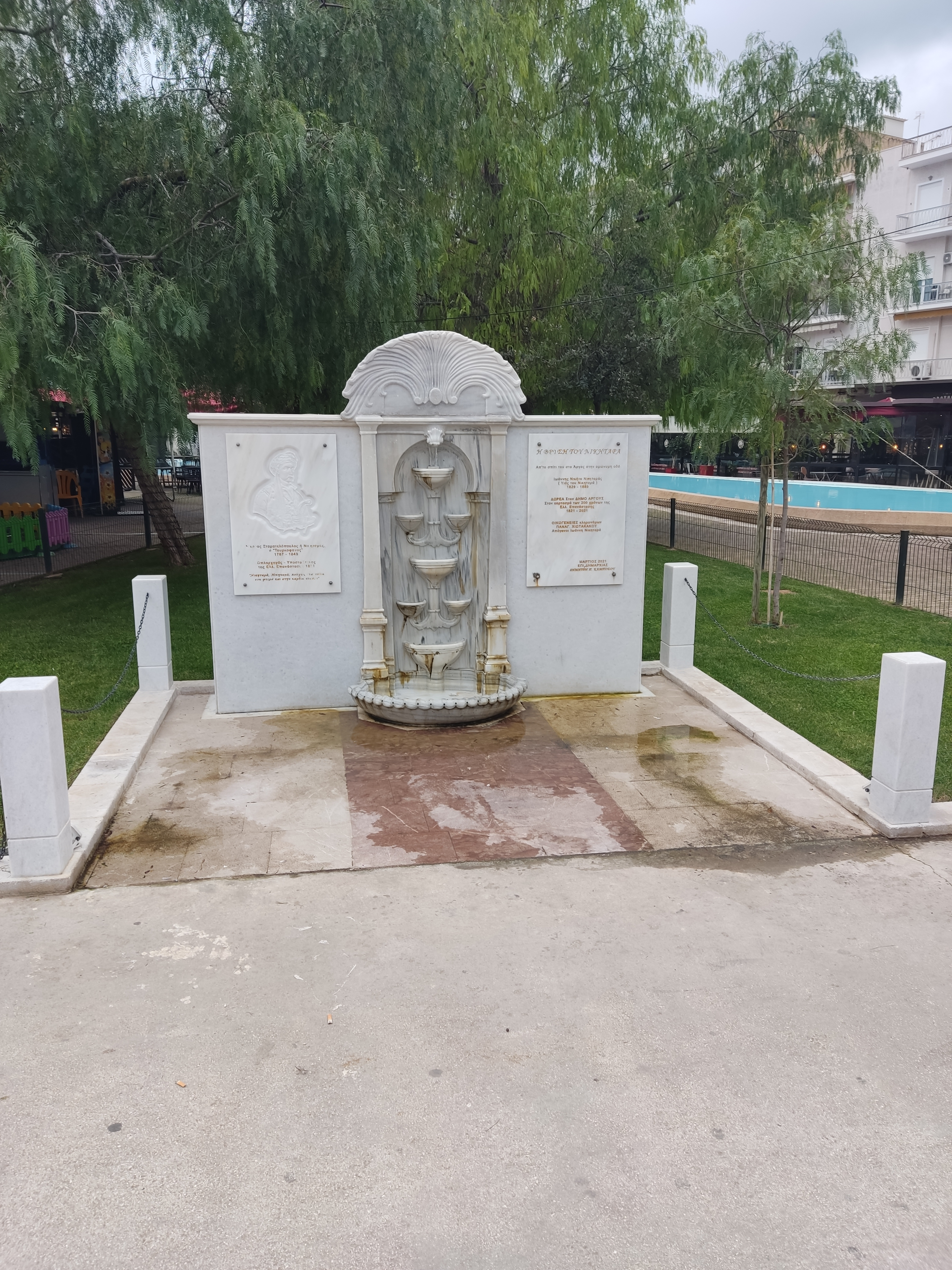
The Nikitaras tap was unveiled in March 2021.

The city of Argos is delimited to the north by dry river Xerias, to the east by Inachos river and Panitsa stream (which emanates from the latter), to the west by the Larissa hill (site of homonymous castle and of a monastery called Panagia Katakekrymeni-Portokalousa) and the Aspida Hill (unofficially Prophetes Elias hill), and to the south by the Notios Periferiakos road.

The Agios Petros (Saint Peter) square, along with the eponymous cathedral (dedicated to saint Peter the Wonderworker), make up the town centre, whereas some other characteristic town squares are the Laiki Agora (Open Market) square, officially Dimokratias (Republic) square, where, as implied by its name, an open market takes place twice a week, Staragora (Wheat Market), officially Dervenakia square, and Dikastirion (Court) square. Bonis Park is an essential green space of the city.

Currently, the most commercially active streets of the city are those surrounding the Agios Petros square (Kapodistriou, Danaou, Vassileos Konstantinou streets) as well as Korinthou street. The Pezodromi (Pedestrian Streets), i.e. the paved Michael Stamou, Tsaldari and Venizelou streets, are the most popular meeting point, encompassing a wide variety of shops and cafeterias. The neighborhood of Gouva, which extends around the intersection of Vassileos Konstantinou and Tsokri streets, is also considered a commercial point.

In the center of the city, next to the St. Peter's church, there is an artificial lake that was constructed and filled during an extensive redevelopment works in the city, which lasted between February 2015 and April 2016. During the work for the redevelopment of the city's square the floor of the old (now demolished) church of St. Nicholas was found, which was located north of the present-day church of St. Peter, that was built after 1865. Pursuant to a decision of the Central Archaeological Council, the floor and part of the sidewalls of the old church were covered with dirt in early March 2016.

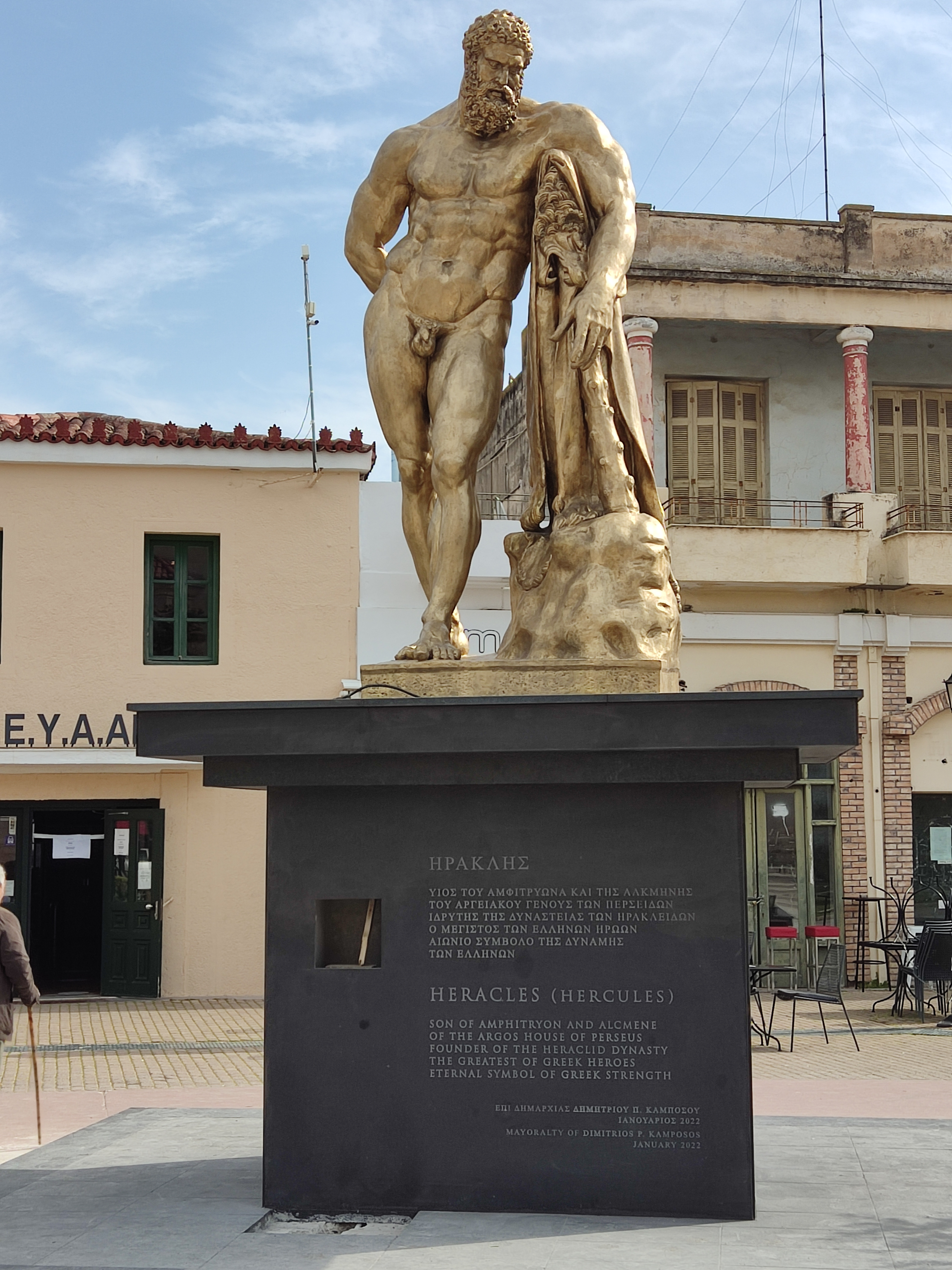
The statue of Hercules

On 15 February 2022 a new statue of Heracles was unveiled. It is a replica of a statue made by Lysippus of Sicyon in the 4th century BC. The Roman copy of Lysippus's statue is known as the Farnese Hercules, and it is exhibited in Naples, Italy.

In March 2022 the construction of the fountain in St. Peter's square was completed. In the base of the marble fountain there are four lions. Above the visitor can see four members of the Danaids. The fountain has a width of 7 meters and a height of 5 meters, while the fountain was designed in collaboration with the Supreme School of Fine Arts in Athens.

The city has three monasteries that are located in Larissa hill.

=== Population ===
In 700 BC there were at least 5,000 people living in the city. In the fourth century BC, the city was home to as many as 30,000 people. Today, according to the 2021 Greek census, the city has a population of 21,891. It is the largest city in Argolis, larger than the capital Nafplio.

=== Economy ===
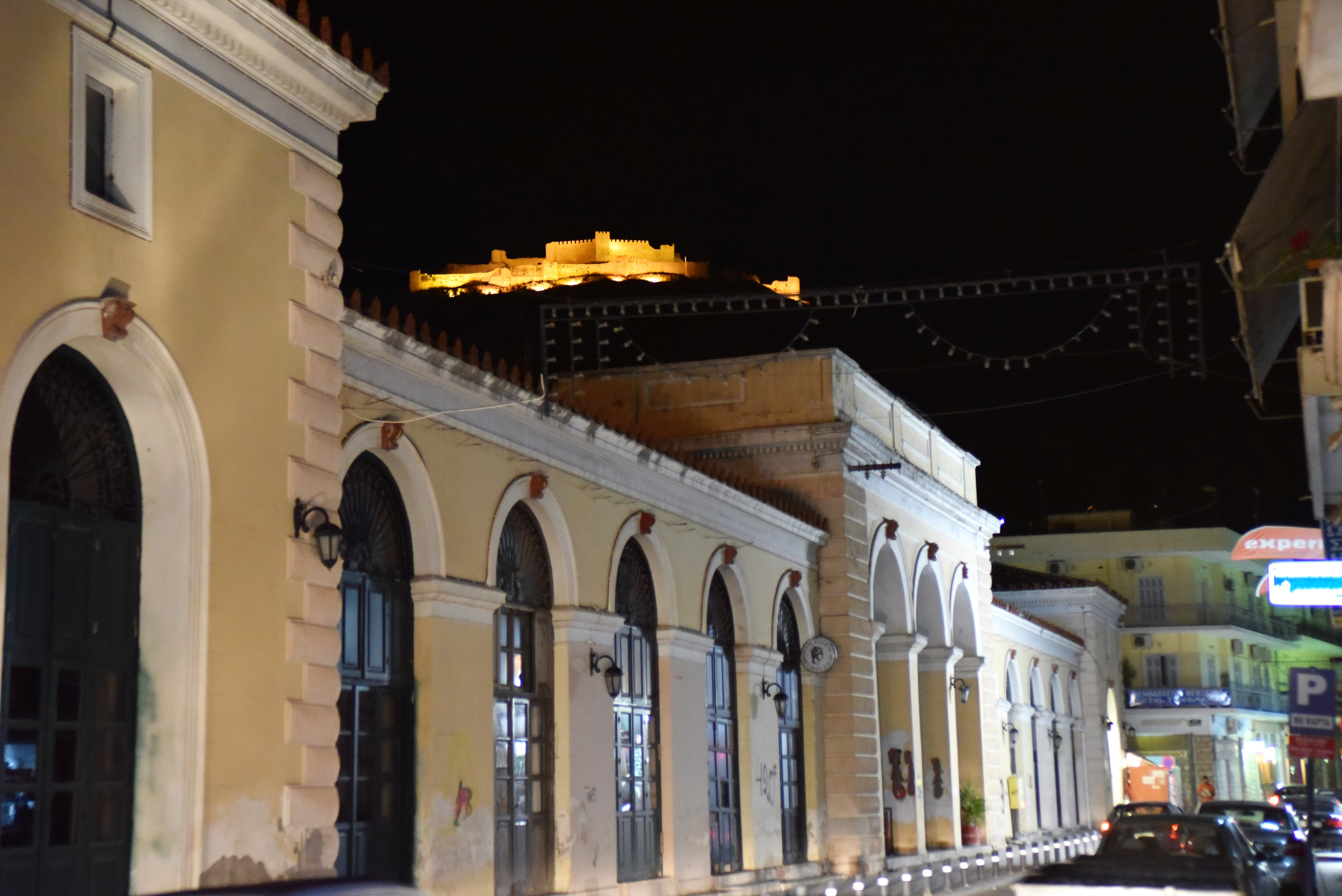
Municipal market

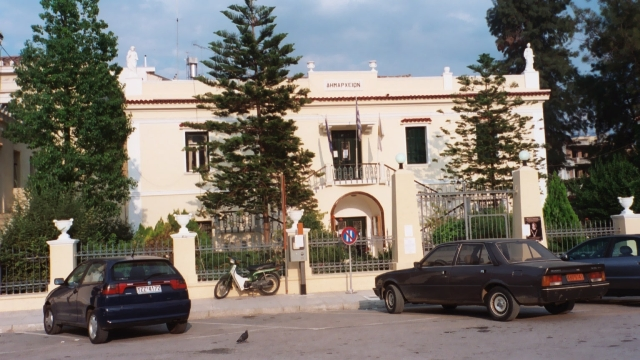
The old City Hall in 2002; built in 1830, it served as the headquarters of municipal government until 2012

The primary economic activity in the area is agriculture. Citrus fruits are the predominant crop, followed by olives and apricots. The area is also famous for its local melon variety, Argos melons (or Argitiko). There is also important local production of dairy products, factories for fruits processing.

Considerable remains of the ancient and medieval city survive and are a popular tourist attraction.

== Monuments ==
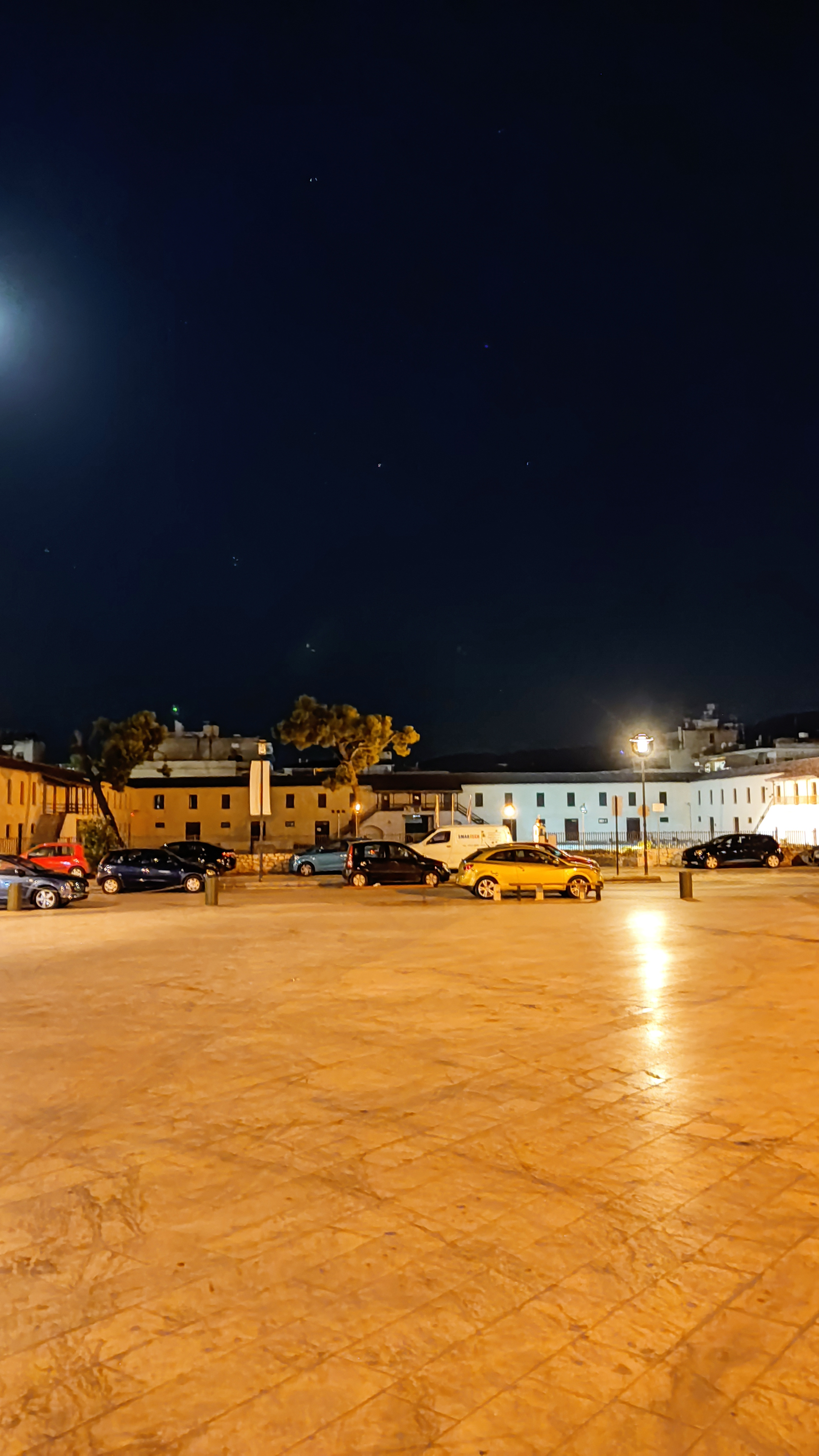
Capodistria's Barracks in Argos at night

Most of Argos's historical and archaeological monuments are currently unused, abandoned, or only partially renovated:

- The Larisa castle, built during prehistoric time, which has undergone several repairs and expansions since antiquity and played a significant historical role during the Venetian domination of Greece and the Greek War of Independence. It is located on top of the Larissa Hill, which also constitutes the highest spot of the city (289 m.). In ancient times, a castle was also found on neighbouring Aspida Hill. When connected with walls, these two castles fortified the city from enemy invasions.
- The ancient theatre, built in the 3rd century B.C with a capacity of 20,000 spectators, replaced an older neighbouring theatre of the 5th century BC and communicated with the ancient agora. It was visible from any part of the ancient city and the Argolic gulf. In 1829, it was used by Ioannis Kapodistrias for the Fourth National Assembly of the new Hellenic State. Today, cultural events are held at its premises during the summer months.
- The ancient agora, adjacent to the ancient theatre, which developed in the 6th century B.C., was located at the junction of the ancient roads coming from Corinth, Heraion and Tegea. Excavations in the area have uncovered a bouleuterion, built in 460 B.C. when Argos adopted the democratic regime, a Sanctuary of Apollo Lyceus and a palaestra.
- The "Criterion" of Argos, an ancient monument located on the southwest side of the town, on the foot of Larissa hill, which came to have its current structure during the 6th–3rd century BC period. Initially, it served as a court of ancient Argos, similar to Areopagus of Athens. According to mythology, it was at this area where Hypermnestra, one of the 50 daughters of Danaus, the first king of Argos, was tried. Later, under the reigns of Hadrian, a fountain was created to collect and circulate water coming from the Hadrianean aqueduct located in northern Argos. The site is connected via a paved path with the ancient theatre.
- The Barracks of Kapodistrias, a preservable building with a long history. Built in the 1690s during the Venetian domination of Greece, they initially served as a hospital run by the Sisters of Mercy. During the Tourkokratia, they served as a market and a post office. Later, in 1829, significant damage caused during the Greek revolution was repaired by Kapodistrias who turned the building into a cavalry barrack, a school (1893–1894), an exhibition space (1899), a shelter for Greek refugees displaced during the population exchange between Greece and Turkey (since 1920) and an interrogation and torture space (during the German occupation of Greece). In 1955–68, it was used by the army for the last time; it now accommodates the Byzantine Museum of Argos, local corporations and also serves as an exhibition space.
- The Municipal Neoclassical Market building (unofficially the "Kamares", i.e. arches, from the arches that it boasts), built in 1889, which is located next to Dimokratias square, is one of the finest samples of modern Argos's masterly architecture, in Ernst Ziller style. The elongated, two corridor, preservable building accommodates small shops.
- The Kapodistrian school, in central Argos. Built by architect Labros Zavos in 1830, as part of Kapodistrias's efforts to provide places of education to the Greek people, it could accommodate up to 300 students. However, technical difficulties led to its decay, until it was restored several times, the last of which being in 1932. Today, its neoclassical character is evident, with the building housing the 1st elementary school of the town.
- The old Town Hall, built during the time of Kapodistrias in 1830, which originally served as a venue for a justice of the peace, the local government of Argos, an arm of the carabineers and a prison. From 1987 to 2012, it housed the town hall, which is now located in Kapodistriou street.
- The house of philhellene Thomas Gordon, built in 1829 that served as an all-girls school, a dance school and was home to the 4th Greek artillery regiment. Today it accommodates the French Institute of Athens (Institut Français d' Athènes).
- The house of Spyridon Trikoupis (built in 1900), where the politician was born and spent his childhood. Also located in the estate, which is not open to public, is the Saint Charalambos chapel where Trikoupis was baptized.
- The house of general Tsokris, important military fighter in the Greek revolution of 1821 and later assemblyman of Argos.
- The temple of Agios Konstadinos, one of the very few remaining buildings in Argos dating from the Ottoman Greece era. It is estimated to have been built around 1570–1600, with a minaret also having existed in its premises. It served as a mosque and an Ottoman cemetery up to 1871, when it was declared a Christian temple.
- The chambered tombs of the Aspida hill.
- The Hellinikon Pyramid. Dating back to late 4th century B.C., it has elicited many theories as to its purpose (tumulus, fortress). Together with the widely accepted scientific chronology, there are some people who claim it was built shortly after the Great Pyramid of Giza as a symbol of the excellent relationship the citizens of Argos had with Egypt.

A great number of archaeological findings, dating from the prehistoric ages, can be found at the Argos museum, housed at the old building of Dimitrios Kallergis at Saint Peter's square. The Argos airfield, located in the homonymous area (Aerodromio) in the northwest outskirts of the city, is also worth mentioning. The area it covers was created in 1916–1917 and was heavily used during the Greco-Italian War and for the training of new Kaberos school aviators for the Hellenic Air Force Academy. It also constituted an important benchmark in the organization of the Greek air forces in southern Greece. Furthermore, the airfield was used by the Germans for the release of their aerial troops during the Battle of Crete. It was last used as a landing/takeoff point for spray planes (for agricultural purposes in the olive tree cultivations) up until 1985.

== Transportation ==
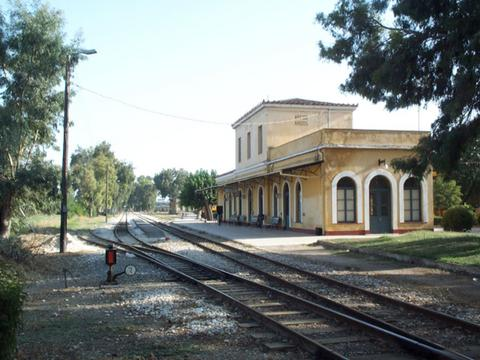
The railway station

Argos is connected via regular bus services with neighbouring areas as well as Athens. In addition, taxi stands can be found at the Agios Petros as well as the Laiki Agora square. A good road network ensures the connection of the city with the surrounding towns, villages and the rest of Peloponnese and the country.

The city also has a railway station which, at the moment, remains closed due to an indefinite halt to all railway services in the Peloponnese area by the Hellenic Railways Organisation. However, in late 2014, it was announced that the station would open up again, as part of an expansion of the Athens suburban railway in Argos, Nafplio and Korinthos, however the plan never came in fruition. Finally in mid 2020 it was announced by the administration of Peloponnese Region their cooperation with the Hellenic Railways Organisation for the metric line and stations maintenance for the purpose of the line's reoperation in the middle of 2021. As of April 2023, no steps have been taken to prepare for reopening of the railway lines, to the dismay of the local population.

== Education ==
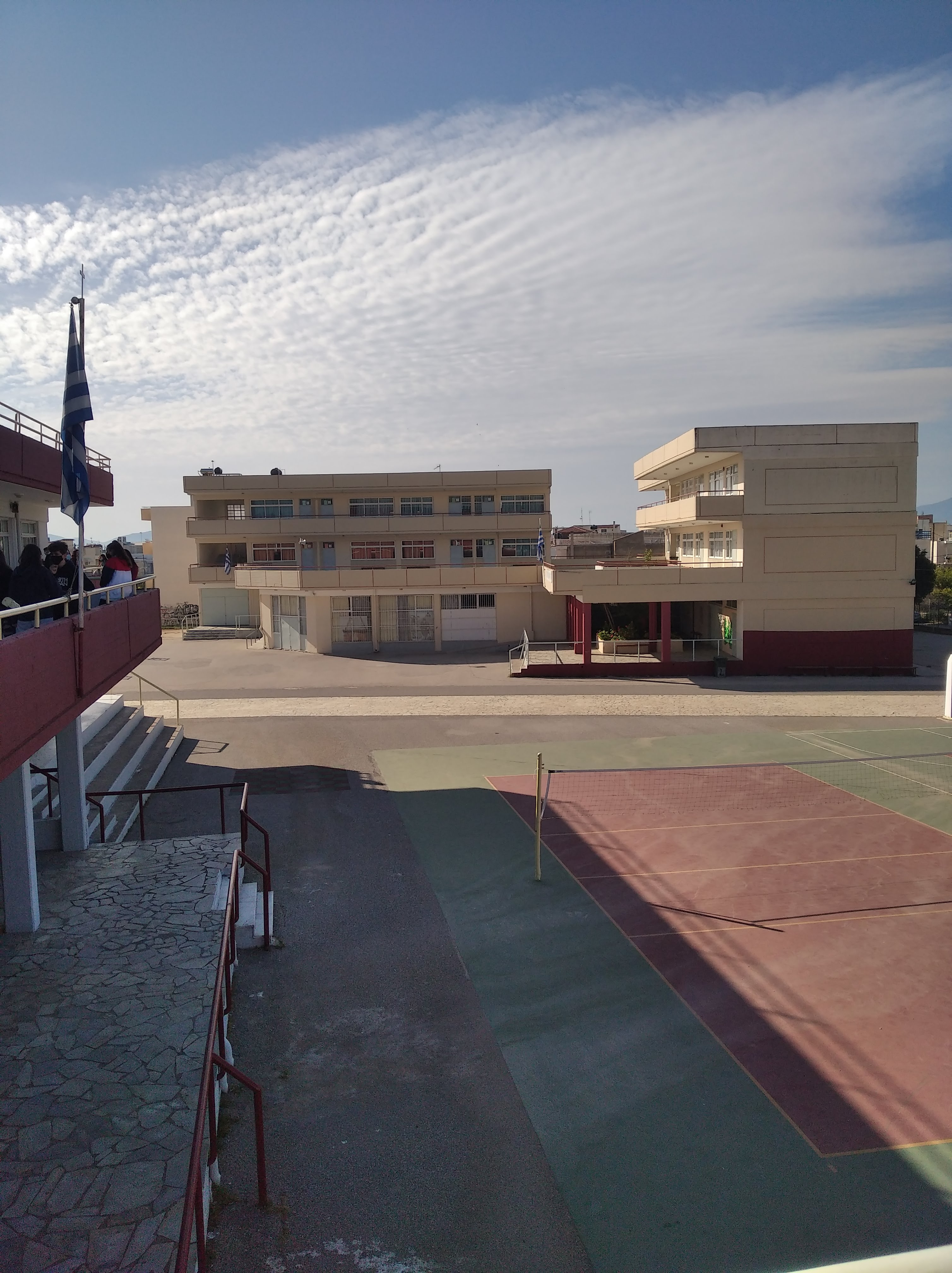
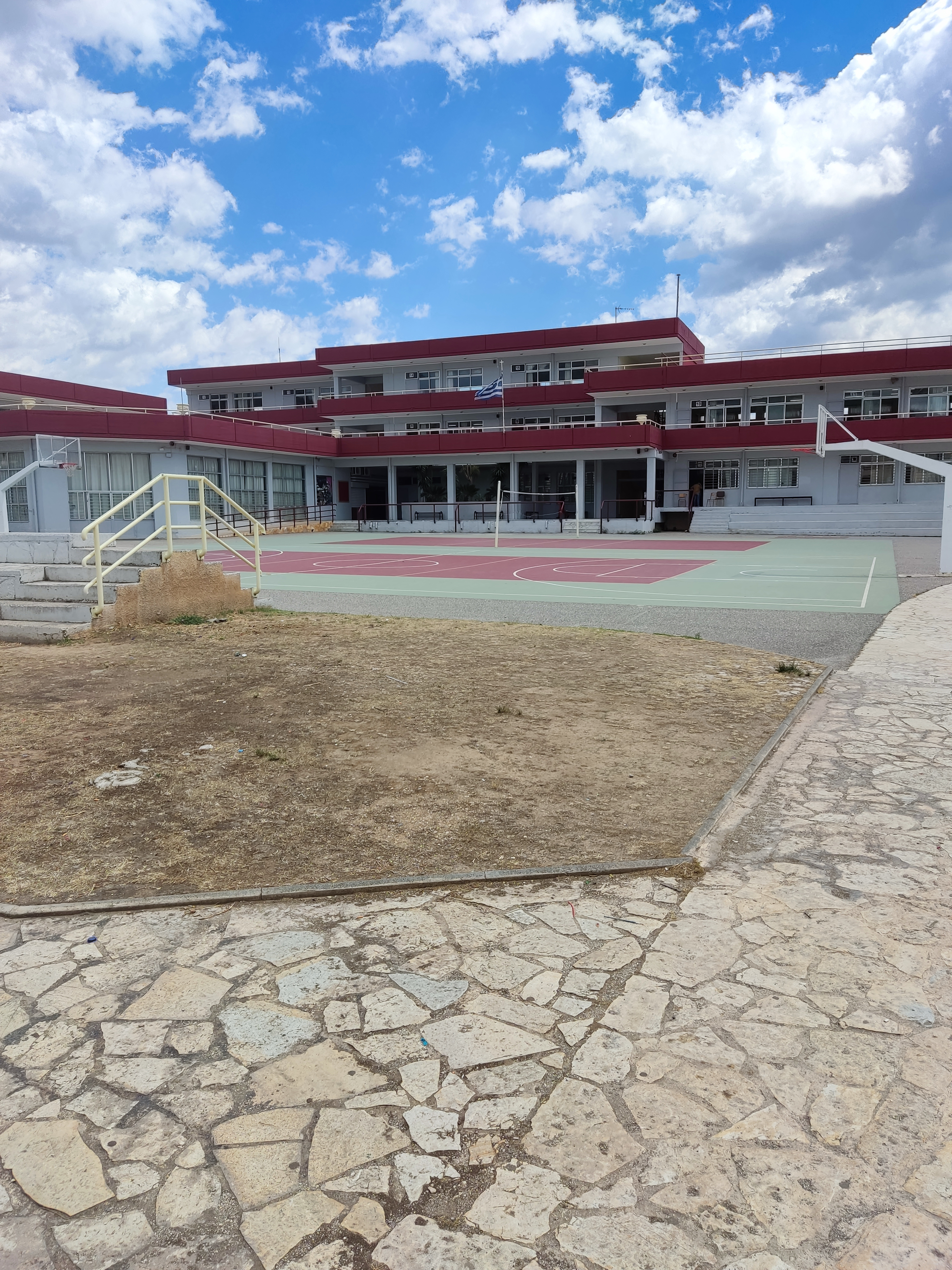
View of the second and third middle school of Argos, plus of the first high school of the city (top) Panoramic view of the First High School of Argos (bottom)

Argos has a wide range of educational institutes that also serve neighbouring sparsely populated areas and villages. In particular, the city has seven dimotika (primary schools), four gymnasia (junior high), three lyceums (senior high), one vocational school, one music school as well as a Touristical Business and Cooking department and a post-graduate ASPETE department. The city also has two public libraries.

For the academic year 2020–2021, the beginning of operations for a faculty of Rural Economy of the University of Peloponnese in Argos was planned. However, the creation of this faculty was cancelled by the Greek ministry of education.

There is a municipal children's-youth library next to the Bonis Park, and another one next to Aggeli Bobou street.

== Mayors of Argos ==
The municipality was established in 1834 and operated till 1914 and again since 1925 till 2010 when it was abolished. During 1914–1925, it was downgraded into community, due to having less than 10,000 population. Before the Kapodistrias reform in 1997, municipality of Argos contained only the community of Argos. First mayor was Hristos Vlassis.

- 1834–1838 Hristos Vlassis
- 1838–1841, 1852–1855 Konstantinos Vokos
- 1841–1848 Georgios Tsokris
- 1848–1852 Konstantinos Rodopoulos
- 1855–1858 Ioannis Vlassis (and congressman)
- 1858–1861 Petros Divanis (doctor)
- 1861–1866 Lambros Lambrinidis
- 1866–1870 Mihail Pashalinopoulos
- 1870–1874, 1879–1883 Mihail Papalexopoulos (doctor, congressman, governor)
- 1874–1875, 1883–1891, 1893–1899 Spilios Kalmouhos
- 1891–1893 Haralambos Mistakopoulos (1830–1894, died in office)
- 1899–1903 Emmanouil Roussos (doctor)
- 1903–1907 Dimitrios P. Kouzis (1870–1958) (senator and congressman)
- 1907–1914 Andreas Karatzas (lawyer)
- 1917–1918 Hristos Karagiannis (president of Argos Community)
- 1925-22 January 1928 Aggelis Bobos (1878–1928) merchant, (died in office)
- 1928–1941 Konstantinos Bobos (merchant). He succeeded his brother Angelis.
- 1941–1943 Efthimios Smirniotatkis (lawyer)
- 1943–1944 Georgios Papagiannopoulos (lawyer)
- 1944–1945 Konstantinos Dorovinis (dentist)
- ...
- 1951–1964 Efstathios Marinos (1902–1990)
- 1964–1967 Georgios Thomopoulos (1906–1995)
- 1967–1973 Theodoros Polihronopoulos
- 1973–1974 Marios Presvelos
- 1974–1975 (appointment by the government of national unity)
- 1975–1978 Dimitrios Bonis
- 1979–1986 Georgios Peirounis (1926–1999)
- 1987–1998 Dimitrios Papanikolaou (1937–2017)
- 1999–2002 Nikolaos Koligliatis
- 2003–2006 Dimitrios Platis
- 2007–2010 Vasileios Bouris
- 2011–2023 Dimitrios Kamposos
- 2024– Ioannis Maltezos

== Sports ==
Argos hosts two major sport clubs with presence in higher national divisions and several achievements, Panargiakos F.C. football club, founded in 1926 and AC Diomidis Argous handball club founded in 1976. Other sport clubs that are based in Argos: A.E.K. Argous, Apollon Argous, Aristeas Argous, Olympiakos Argous, Danaoi and Panionios Dalamanaras.

The city has a municipal sports' center, an indoor gym and a municipal swimming bath that was opened in May 2021.

Sport clubs based in Argos
Club	Founded	Sports	Achievements
Panargiakos F.C.	1926	Football	Earlier presence in Alpha Ethniki
AC Diomidis Argous	1976	Handball	Panhellenic and European titles in Greek handball

== Notable people ==
- Acrisius, mythological king
- Theoclymenus, mythological prophet
- Agamemnon, legendary leader of the Achaeans in the Trojan War
- Acusilaus (6th century BC), logographer and mythographer
- Ageladas (6th–5th century BC), sculptor
- Calchas (8th century BC), Homeric mythological seer
- Karanos (8th century BC), founder of the Macedonian Argead Dynasty
- Leo Sgouros (13th century), Byzantine despot
- Nikon the Metanoeite (10th century), Christian saint of Armenian origin, according to some sources born in Argos
- Pheidon (7th century BC), king of Argos
- Argus (7th century BC), king of Argos
- Polykleitos (5th–4th century BC), sculptor
- Polykleitos the Younger (4th century BC), sculptor
- Telesilla (6th century BC), Greek poet
- Bilistiche, hetaira and lover of pharaoh Ptolemy II Philadelphus
- Eleni Bakopanos (born 1954), Canadian politician
- Samuel Greene Wheeler Benjamin (1837–1914), American statesman

== International relations ==
=== Twin towns and sister cities ===
Argos is twinned with:

- Veria, Greece
- Abbeville, France
- Episkopi, Cyprus
- (Georgia (country)) Mtskheta, Georgia (1991)

== See also ==
- Argos (dog)
- Communities of Argos (municipal unit)
- Kings of Argos
- List of ancient Greek cities
- List of settlements in Argolis

== Sources and external links ==
- Official website
- Website of abolished Municipality of Argos (web archive)
- GCatholic with incumbent bio links
- The Theatre at Argos, The Ancient Theatre Archive, Theatre specifications and virtual reality tour of theatre
