= Cyanippus =

Name of various mythological characters

In Greek mythology, the name Cyanippus (Ancient Greek: Κυάνιππος) may refer to:

- Cyanippus, son of Aegialeus and Comaetho, or else son of Adrastus and Amphithea and brother of Aegialeus. He fought in the Trojan War and was one of the men who entered the Trojan Horse. According to Ibycus, he was the most handsome man who fought at Troy. For a while, he ruled over Argos. He died childless and was succeeded by Cylarabes, son of Sthenelus.
- Cyanippus, son of Pharax, from Thessaly. He fell in love with the beautiful Leucone and married her, but he was so fond of hunting that he would not spend any time with his young wife. Leucone, suspecting her husband of infidelity, followed him to the woods to spy on him. Cyanippus' hounds scented her hiding in the thicket and, taking her for a wild animal, rushed at the woman and tore her to pieces. Cyanippus himself came up too late; he set up a funeral pyre for his wife, slew his dogs upon it and then killed himself. The story is similar to that of Cephalus and Procris.
- Cyanippus, a Syracusan who did not venerate Dionysus. The god punished him by making him drunk, in which state Cyanippus raped his own daughter Cyane. She managed to take a ring off the rapist's finger, so that she could recognize him later, and gave the ring to her nurse. Soon after that, the city was affected with plague, and the oracle of Apollo pronounced that there was an impious man in the city who was to be sacrificed in order to put an end to the calamity. Cyane was the only one to understand the prophecy. She grabbed her father by the hair, cut his throat and then killed herself in the same manner.
