= Aegialeus (king of Argos) =

Prince of Argos, son of Adrastus

Aegialeus (Ancient Greek: Αἰγιαλεύς derived from αἰγιαλός aigialos "beach, sea-shore") also Aegealeus, Aigialeus, Egialeus, was the elder son of Adrastus, a king of Argos, and either Amphithea or Demonassa.

== Mythology ==
Aegialeus was identified as one of the Epigoni, who avenged their fathers' disastrous attack on the city of Thebes by retaking the city, by both Pausanias and Hellanikos. While his father was the only one of the Seven against Thebes who did not die in the battle, Aegialeus was the only one of the leaders of the Epigoni who was killed when they retook the city. Laodamas, the son of Eteocles, killed him at Glisas, and he was buried at Pagae in Megaris. Laodamas, his killer, is said to have either escaped to Illyria or have been killed by Alcmaon. Adrastus died of grief after his son's death, and Diomedes, Adrastus' grandson by his daughter Deipyle, succeeded him. Aegialeus' son was Cyanippus, who took the throne following the exile of Diomedes. He was worshipped as a hero at Pegae in Megaris, and it was believed that his body had been conveyed thither from Thebes and been buried there.
