= Oicles =

In Greek mythology, Oicles or Oecles (/ˈɛkliːz/; Ancient Greek: Οἰκλῆς, romanized: Oiklễs), also Oicleus or Oecleus (/ˈɛkljuːs/; Οἰκλεύς), was the father of the seer Amphiaraus. He accompanied Heracles on his campaign against Troy.

== Family ==
According to Homer's Odyssey, Oicles was the son of Antiphates, who was the son of Melampus. Diodorus Siculus adds that Oicles' mother was Zeuxippe, the daughter Hippocoon. According to the Catalogue of Women, Oicles wed "Godly" Hypermnestra and together they had Amphiaraus "leader of the people", the "lovely" Iphianeira, and Endeos "lord of men", while according to Diodorus, the children were Amphiaraus, Iphianeira, and Polyboea.

== Mythology ==
Oicles accompanied Heracles in his campaign against Troy. Upon arriving at the Troad, Oicles was put in charge of guarding the expedition's ships, while Heracles left with the main force to attack the city. Oicles' company was attacked by Laomedon the king of Troy, who was attempting to burn the invaders ships. Oicles was killed by Laomedon, but his men were able to save the ships by taking them out to sea. The tragedian Sophocles, possibly wrote a play titled Oicles, which dealt with this story.

By some accounts, Oicles lived for a time in Arcadia. According to the mythographer Apollodorus, after the capture of Thebes by the Epigoni, Oicles was visited there by his grandson Alcmaeon, the son of Ampiaraus. Pausanias reports seeing what was said to be the tomb of Oicles near Megalopolis in Arcadia.
