= Megapenthes =

Multiple Greek mythological figures

In Greek mythology, Megapenthes (/ˌmɛɡəˈpɛnˌθiːz/; Ancient Greek: Μεγαπένθης, romanized: Megapénthēs, lit. 'great sorrow' or 'great grief') is a name that refers to two characters:

- Megapenthes, a son of Proetus.
- Megapenthes, a son of Menelaus.
