= Melampus =

In Greek mythology, legendary soothsayer and healer

In Greek mythology, Melampus (/mɪˈlæmpəs/; Ancient Greek: Μελάμπους, romanized: Melámpous) was a legendary soothsayer and healer, originally of Pylos, who ruled at Argos.

Melampus was the introducer of the worship of Dionysus, according to Herodotus, who asserted that his powers as a seer were derived from the Egyptians and that he could understand the language of animals. A number of pseudepigraphal works of divination were circulated in Classical and Hellenistic times under the name Melampus. According to Herodotus and Pausanias (vi.17.6), on the authority of Hesiod, his father was Amythaon, whose name implies the "ineffable" or "unspeakably great"; thus Melampus and his heirs were Amythaides of the "House of Amythaon". Maurice de Guérin made him one of the characters of his prose poem, "The Centaur", in 1835.

== Mythology ==
=== Birth ===
According to Dieuchidas, the mother of Melampus was Dorippe and he gave the reason for the seer's name. After Melampus' mother gave birth to him, she exposed him in a wooded place but it happened that his feet were blackened by the sun because they were left unshaded whence comes the name Melampus, meaning "black-foot".

=== Soothsaying myths ===
==== Homer's account ====
In Homer's Odyssey, a digression concerning the lineage of Theoclymenus, "a prophet, sprung from Melampus' line of seers", sketches the epic narrative concerning Melampus with such brevity that its details must have been familiar to Homer's audience. With brief hints, a sequence of episodes is alluded to, in which we discern strife in Pylos between Melampus and Neleus, who usurps Melampus's "great high house", forcing him into heroic exile. Melampus spends a year as bondsman in the house of Phylacus, "all for Neleus' daughter Pero". At his extremity, Melampus is visited by "the mad spell a Fury, murderous spirit, cast upon his mind. But the seer worked free of death" and succeeded at last in rustling Phylacus's cattle back to Pylos, where he avenged himself on Neleus and gave Pero in marriage to his brother Bias. But Melampus's own destiny lay in Argos, where he lived and ruled, married and sired a long line, also briefly sketched in Homer's excursus.

==== King of Argos ====
At a later date the narrative was embellished with anecdotal detail: Melampus lived in Pylos during the reign of Anaxagoras or possibly Proetus. The king offered a reward for anybody that could heal his son, who suffered from a strange malady. Melampus killed an ox and talked to the vultures that came to eat the corpse. They said that the last time they had had such a feast was when the king had made a sacrifice. They told Melampus that the prince had been frightened of the big, bloody knife and the king tossed it aside to calm the child. It had hit a tree and injured a hamadryad, who cursed the prince with the sickness. The hamadryad told Melampus that the boy would be healed if the knife was taken out of the trunk of the tree and boiled, then the prince should drink the rusty water that resulted. Melampus followed her directions and, as payment for the cure, demanded two thirds of the kingdom for himself, and one third for his brother, Bias. The king agreed.

==== Proetids ====
In another version of Melampus' story, when the three Proetids or all the women of Argos were driven mad by Dionysus, in the reign of Anaxagoras or possibly Proetus, Melampus was brought in to cure them, but demanded a third of the kingdom as payment. The king refused, but the women became wilder than ever, and he was forced to seek out Melampus again, who this time demanded both a third for himself and another third for his brother Bias. The king felt he had no choice but to agree, and so Melampus led them to the city of Lusi where they were healed of their madness in a sanctuary of Artemis.

==== Gift of serpents ====
Melampus' reputation as a seer spawned myths that verge on anecdote, to account for his gift, the offering of serpents. In one, as a young boy, he told his servants not to kill two snakes. Grateful, the snakes gave Melampus the ability to speak with animals.

Another version says that he found a mother snake that had been crushed under a cart and two orphaned babies. Rather than leaving them he gave the snake a burial and raised the young ones. To thank him they licked his ears so clean that he was able to understand animals.

After this there were three kings ruling Argos at any time, one descended from each of Bias, Melampus, and Anaxagoras. Melampus was succeeded by his son Mantius, and his house of Melampus lasted down to the brothers Alcmaeon and Amphilochus, who fought in the Trojan War.

==== Melampus' kidnapping ====
Late in his life, Melampus was kidnapped. In his cell, he overheard two termites talking, claiming they would be finished eating through Melampus' ceiling the next morning. Melampus called his captors and demanded a move. He made such an uproar that the kidnappers agreed. When the ceiling collapsed the next morning, the kidnappers decided he was a prophet and that to hold on to him might offend the gods. They let him go.

=== Midas' secret ===
Melampus also figures in the tale of King Midas, the pleasure-loving King of Phrygia. King Midas was chosen to be a judge between the famous musical contest between Apollo and Marsyas. Although Apollo clearly had won, King Midas disagreed with the other judges. Apollo called the King an ass, and to prove his point he touched him on the head and gave Midas the ears of a donkey. Long and hairy they sprouted up, and Midas in a panic covered them up with a tall Phrygian cap, hoping nobody ever discovered his embarrassing secret. Only his barber knew of this disgraceful matter, but Midas had warned him that he would be put to death if ever he revealed to anyone the asinine state of the King's ears. The barber found himself bursting with the secret and couldn't bear to keep the gossip to himself, but was afraid for his life. So he dug a hole in the bank of the Pactolus river and, after making certain that nobody was listening, he whispered into the hole that "King Midas has ass's ears." Filling up the hole to forever bury the secret, the barber went away happy and at peace with himself.

All was well until the next spring, when a reed sprouted up from the hole and whispered to the other reeds that King Midas had the ears of a donkey. These reeds in turn whispered the secret to all creatures who passed. Soon the birds learned the news and brought it to Melampus. Melampus told all his friends and soon the entire kingdom knew about King Midas' miserable secret.

== Melampus' alleged writings ==
Three works have survived under the name "Melampus."

- Peri Palmon Mantike, an extended treatise on divination by twitches (palomancy), existing in a number of versions;
- Peri Elaion tou somatos, a short work on divination by moles
- An astrological lunarium. The twitch text begins with a dedication to a king Ptolemy, probably Ptolemy Philadelphus, which is also probably spurious.

A certain Melampus wrote a treatise on the laws of symmetry prior to the first century BC. (Vitruvius VII, introduction). This treatise is lost.

== Melampodia ==
A work attributed in antiquity to Hesiod exists (Melampodia) in such fragmentary quotations and chance remarks that its reconstruction, according to Walter Burkert, is "most uncertain." An attempt was made by I Löffler, Die Melampodie: Versuch einer Rekonstruction des Inhalts (1963).

== Bibliography ==
- Paulos Ntafoulis, Philippos Gourzis, and Constantinos Trompoukis, "Historical Note: Melampous: a psychiatrist before psychiatry," History of Psychiatry, 19,2 (2008), 242-246.
