= Dion (mythology) =

King of Laconia in Greek mythology

- King of Laconia, Sparta

Legendary King of Sparta
- Predecessor: Tisamenus
- Born: Laconia
- Parents: Orestes, Hermione

In Greek mythology, Dion (/ˈdaɪɒn, ən/; Ancient Greek: Δίων) was a King in Laconia and husband of Amphithea, the daughter of Pronax. By his wife, he became the father of Orphe, Lyco, and Carya.

== Mythology ==
The god Apollo, who had been kindly received by Dion and Amphithea, rewarded them by conferring upon their three daughters the gift of prophecy, on condition, however, that they should not betray the gods nor search after forbidden things.

Dion erected a temple to Dionysus, who also visited his house and fell in love with Carya. When Orphe and Lyco tried not to let their sister consort with the god (thus breaking the restrictions imposed by Apollo), Dionysus changed them into rocks and Carya into a walnut tree. The Lacedaemonians, on being informed of it by Artemis, dedicated a temple to Artemis Caryatis.

Regnal titles
Preceded by Tisamenus	King of Sparta; C. 1100s BC	Succeeded by unknown
