= Amphithea =

Name in Greek mythology

Amphithea (Ancient Greek: Ἀμφιθέα) is the name of several women in Greek mythology:

- Amphithea, who was, according to some, the wife of Lycurgus, king of Nemea, and mother of Opheltes (later called Archemorus).
- Amphithea, daughter of Pronax, son of King Talaus of Argos, and thus, sister to Lycurgus. She married Adrastus and was the mother of Argia, Deipyle, Aegiale, Aegialeus and Cyanippus. Another account refers to her as the wife of Dion and the mother of Carya, Lyco and Orphe.
- Amphithea, wife of Autolycus and mother of Anticlea (the mother of Odysseus), Polymede (possible mother of Jason), and a number of sons, including Aesimus (the father of Sinon).
- Amphithea, wife of Aeolus the Etrurian king, and mother of six sons and six daughters, the youngest boy being Macareus, who made his sister Canace pregnant. Both he and his sister killed themselves.
- Amphithea, an alternate name for Hemithea, the sister of Tenes.
