= Polybus of Sicyon =

Son of Hermes and Chthonophyle

In Greek mythology, Polybus (Ancient Greek: Πόλυβος) was the 20th king of Sicyon who reigned for 40 years.

== Family ==
Polybus was the son of Hermes and Chthonophyle, daughter of the eponym of Sicyon. He had a daughter Lysimache or Lysianassa whom he gave in marriage to Talaus of Argos, son of King Bias. Some authors considered the fisherman Glaucus to be Polybus's son by Euboea, daughter of Larymnus.

== Mythology ==
Polybus inherited the throne of Sicyon from his grandfather and during his reign, his grandson Adrastus came to him fleeing from Argos. Afterwards, at the death of Polybus, Adrastus succeeded his grandfather as the new ruler of the city.

Regnal titles
Preceded by Sicyon	King of Sicyon; 40 years	Succeeded by Adrastus
