= Eriphyle =

Figure in Greek mythology

- Member of the Argive royal family
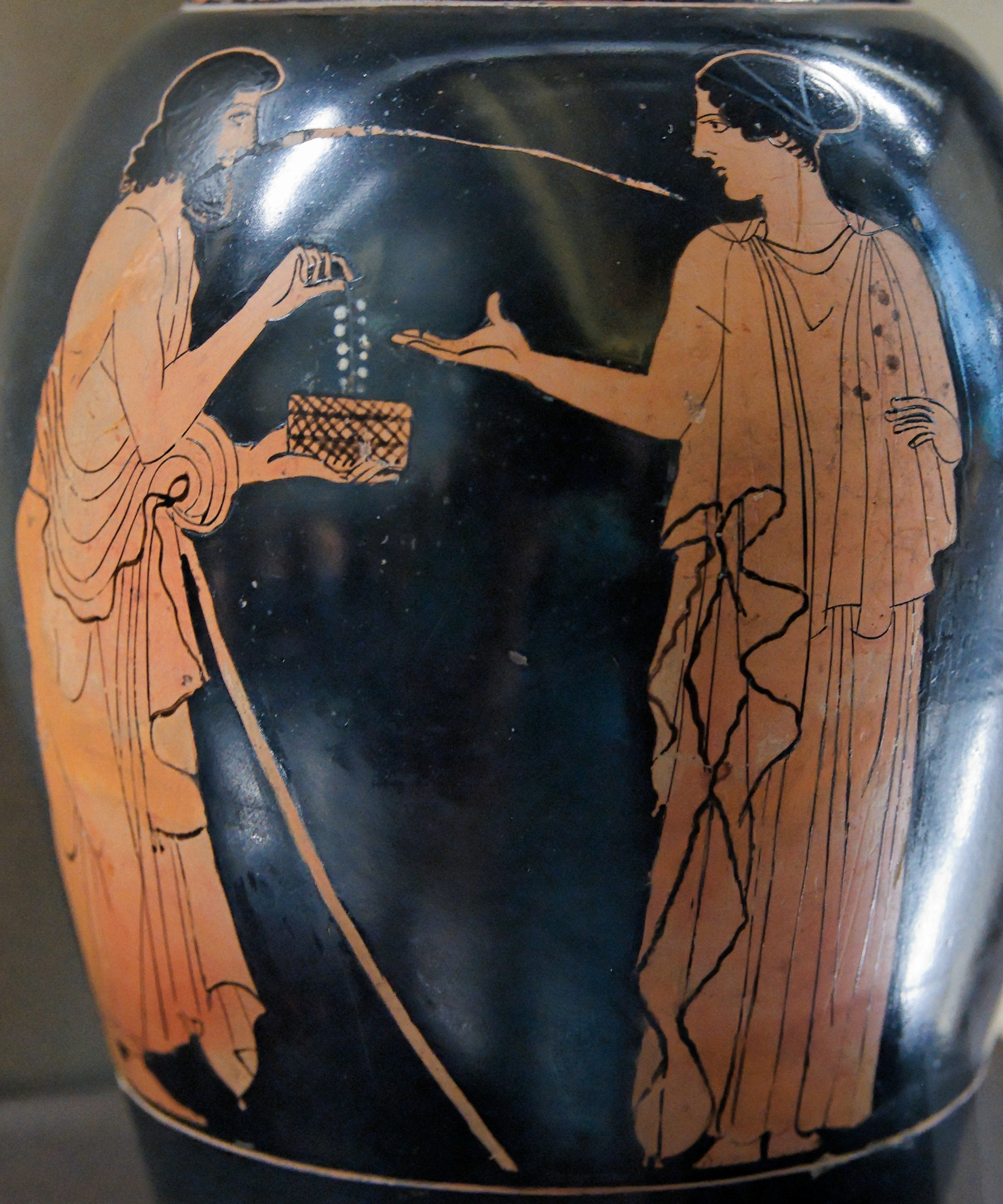
- Polynices offers Eriphyle the Necklace of Harmonia. Red-figure oenochoe by the Mannheim Painter, ca. 450–440 BC, Louvre Museum.
- Abode: Argos

Genealogy
- Parents: Talaus (father); Lysimache (mother)
- Siblings: Adrastus, Parthenopaeus, Pronax, Mecisteus, Aristomachus
- Spouse: Amphiaraus
- Offspring: Alcmaeon, Amphilochus, Alcmene, Eurydice, and Demonassa

Eriphyle (/ɛrɪˈfaɪliː/; Ancient Greek: Ἐριφύλη, romanized: Eriphúlē, lit. 'much-loved by the tribe' or 'of a great clan') was a figure in Greek mythology who, in exchange for the Necklace of Harmonia (also called the Necklace of Eriphyle) given to her by Polynices, persuaded her husband Amphiaraus to join the doomed expedition of the Seven against Thebes. She was then slain by her son Alcmaeon.

== Family ==
Eriphyle was the daughter of King Talaus of Argos and Lysimache, a granddaughter of Melampus. She had five brothers: Adrastus, Parthenopaeus, Pronax, Mecisteus, and Aristomachus. During a feud in Argos, Talaus was slain by the hero Amphiaraus, greatly angering Eriphyle's brother Adrastus. When Adrastus and Amphiaraus eventually reconciled, Adrastus gave him Eriphyle's hand in marriage. Together, Eriphyle and Amphiaraus had two sons, Alcmaeon and Amphilochus. They may have also had three daughters: Alcmene, Eurydice, and Demonassa.

== Mythology ==
Eriphyle's mythology is intertwined with that of the legendary Seven against Thebes, and the war they waged to restore Oedipus' son Polynices to the Theban throne. When assembling an army, Amphiaraus was chosen as one of the seven champions to lead the war effort. Amphiaraus was a seer and refused to join, as he foretold that the plan was doomed to fail. However, Polynices was adamant that he join, and offered the Necklace of Harmonia to Eriphyle in exchange for her persuading her husband to fight. Eriphyle was able to persuade him, because, when she had been offered to Amphiaraus by Adrastus to reconcile their relationship, her brother made Amphiaraus swear to let Eriphyle decide any future dispute between the pair. When Adrastus voted to go to war and Amphiaraus didn't, Eriphyle used the oath to force her husband to take part in the expedition. Aware that Eriphyle had taken a bribe, Amphiaraus instructed his sons Alcmaeon and Amphilochus to avenge him by killing their mother if he did not survive.

In addition to receiving the Necklace of Harmonia to persuade her husband to join the war, she was also bribed with the peplos of Harmonia to persuade her sons to join. She was successful in this endeavor as well, and her sons joined the fight. She kept both items until her death, and they were inherited by Alcmaeon.

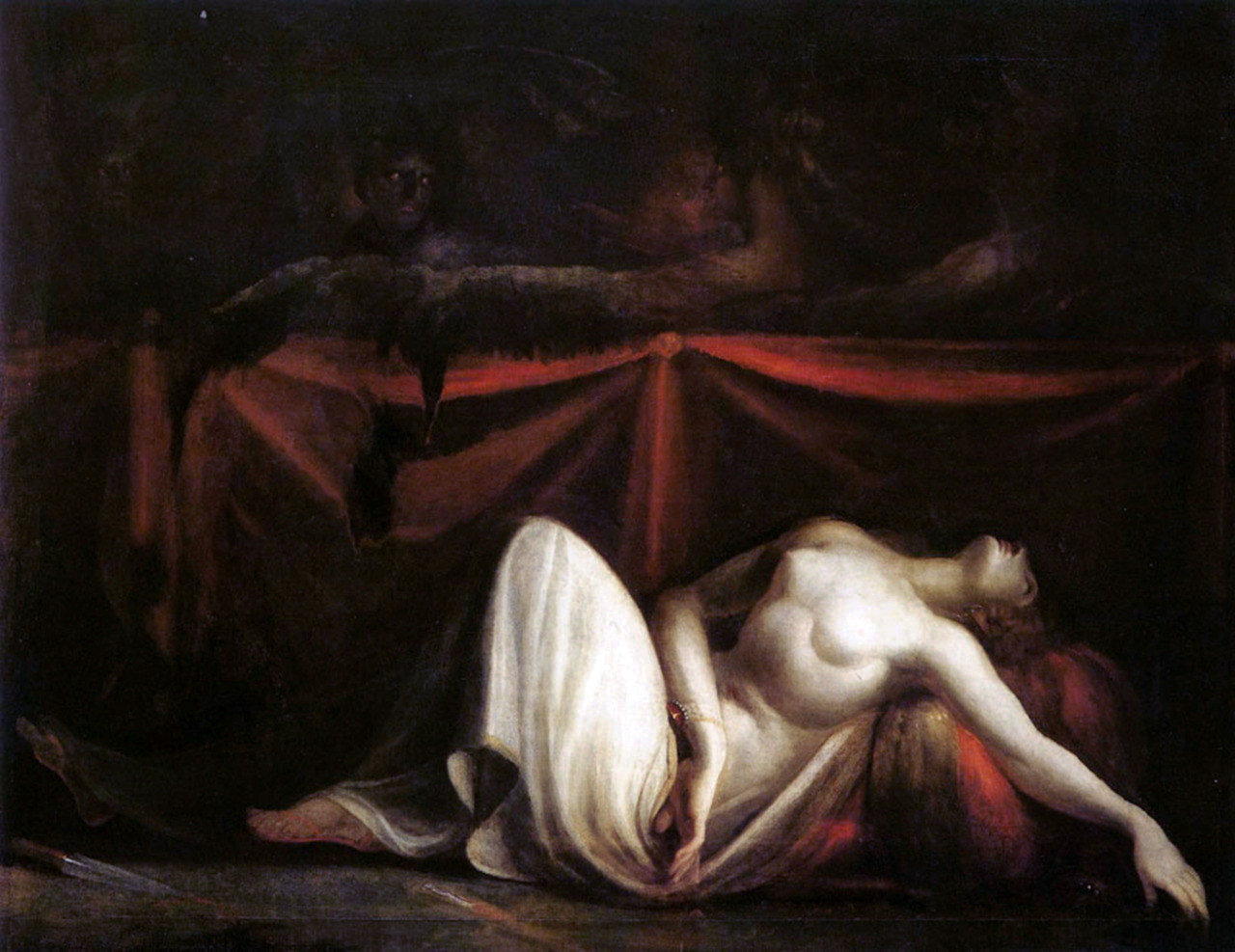
The Erinyes look over the corpse of Eriphyle

Amphiaraus died during the battle. When Alcmaeon learned of his father's death and the bribes his mother had received, he killed Eriphyle. However, for committing matricide, Alcmaeon was haunted and driven mad by the furious ghost of his mother. Alternatively, he was followed by the Erinyes, not a ghost. Alcmaeon was instructed by an oracle of Apollo that he would only be free of his Eriphyle's ghost when he reached land that had not existed at the time when he had slain his mother. Eventually, he reached a new island created by Achelous, who purified him and released him from his mother's ghost.

In Book VI of the Roman poet Virgil's Aeneid, Eriphyle is one of the inhabitants of the "Mourning Fields" (Lugentes Campi), a region of the underworld visited by Aeneas. She still bears the wounds inflicted by her son. In Homer's Odyssey, Odysseus sees Eriphyle in Hades alongside other misfortunate or malicious women, including Phaedra, Procris, Ariadne, Maera, and Clymene. She also plays a role in Statius's Thebaid, in which her desire to attain the Necklace of Harmonia is one of the catalysts for the war between Argos and Thebes. In this version of the myth, however, Argia, Polynices's wife, persuades her husband to give the necklace to Eriphyle so that Amphiaraus will join the war effort.

== Necklace ==
The Necklace of Harmonia was a gift to Cadmus when

Zeus gave him to wife Harmonia, daughter of Aphrodite and Ares. And all the gods quitted the sky, and feasting in the Cadmea celebrated the marriage with hymns. Cadmus gave her a robe and the necklace wrought by Hephaestus, which some say was given to Cadmus by Hephaestus, but Pherecydes says that it was given by Europa, who had received it from Zeus.

A relic was being shown in Amathus in Cyprus, in the time of Pausanias (2nd century CE):

In Cyprus is a city Amathus, in which is an old sanctuary of Adonis and Aphrodite. Here they say is dedicated a necklace given originally to Harmonia, but called the necklace of Eriphyle, because it was the bribe she took to betray her husband. It was dedicated at Delphi by the sons of Phegeus (how they got it I have already related in my history of Arcadia), but it was carried off by the tyrants of Phocis.

The necklace that Pausanias was shown was of green stones with gold, which made him skeptical of its being the one mentioned by Homer (Odyssey xi.327), for he noted other occasions in the Odyssey where necklaces made of gold and stones mention the stones.

== See also ==
- Jean Racine's Iphigénie
- William Makepeace Thackeray's Vanity Fair
- Voltaire's Ériphyle
