= Lysianassa =

Multiple figures in Greek mythology

Lysianassa (/ˌlɪʒiəˈnæsə/; Ancient Greek: Λυσιάνασσα, lit. 'the redeeming mistress' or 'queen who liberates and frees') is the name of four figures in Greek mythology:

- Lysianassa, one of the 50 Nereid daughters of sea god Nereus and his wife Doris, an Oceanid.
- Lysianassa, an Egyptian princess as the daughter of King Epaphus. She bore Poseidon a son, Busiris, King of Egypt who was killed by Heracles.
- Lysianassa, a Sicyonian princess as the daughter of King Polybus. She married King Talaus of Argos and bore him Adrastus and Mecisteus.
- Lysianassa, a Trojan princess as the daughter of King Priam of Troy.
