= Talaus limbatus =

Makapans Talaus crab spider

Conservation status
- Data Deficient (IUCN 3.1)

Scientific classification
- Kingdom: Animalia
- Phylum: Arthropoda
- Subphylum: Chelicerata
- Class: Arachnida
- Order: Araneae
- Infraorder: Araneomorphae
- Family: Thomisidae
- Genus: Talaus
- Species: T. limbatus

Binomial name
- Talaus limbatus Simon, 1895

Species of crab spider

Talaus limbatus is a species of crab spider in the family Thomisidae. It is endemic to South Africa, where it is known only from the type locality at Makapan in Limpopo Province.

== Taxonomy ==
Talaus limbatus was first described by Eugène Simon in 1895 based on a juvenile specimen. The species has been suggested to be possibly misplaced in the genus Talaus and requires taxonomic revision. The holotype is presumed to be deposited at the Muséum National d'Histoire Naturelle in Paris, France, as is typical for Simon's collections.

== Distribution and habitat ==
Talaus limbatus is known only from its type locality at Makapan in Limpopo Province, South Africa, at an elevation of 1433 meters above sea level. The species is a plant dweller and lives freely on vegetation.

== Description ==
As with other members of the genus Talaus, this species is a very small spider measuring less than 4 mm in total length. The cephalothorax is very high and as wide as long, with a truncated front and sloping posterior end. It has a shiny appearance with black eyes arranged in two rows - the front row is straight and broader than the curved back row. The opisthosoma is round and yellow with a white spot.

The legs are almost equal in length and not particularly robust, with few bristles. The leg segments called tarsi are thin and shorter than the preceding metatarsi.

Only juvenile specimens are known, so the adult morphology and any differences between males and females remain unknown.

== Conservation ==
Talaus limbatus is listed as Data Deficient for taxonomic reasons due to the lack of adult specimens and limited distributional data. The species has an estimated extent of occurrence and area of occupancy of only 4 km². Additional sampling is needed to collect adult specimens and better understand the species' range and conservation status.
