= Lyco and Orphe =

Pair of sisters in Greek mythology

Lyco and Orphe (Ancient Greek: Λυκώ καὶ Ὄρφη, romanized: Lukṓ kaì Órphē) is a pair of sisters from Greek mythology. Their brief story survives in the works of Maurus Servius Honoratus, a Latin grammarian of the early fifth century AD.

== Family ==
They were the daughters of Amphithea and Dion, the queen and king of Laconia. They had a third sister named Carya.

== Mythology ==
Once Apollo, the god of prophecy, paid a visit to Dion and his family. He was so well-received that he gave all three of Dion's daughters the gift of prophecy, under the condition that they would never betray the gods or seek after forbidden things. Later, Dionysus visited the family and fell in love with Carya, so that he visited again in order to see her. But Lyco and Orphe guarded Carya, and tried to prevent Dionysus from wooing her. Dionysus then reminded them of their promise to Apollo, and drove them mad. As the two sisters reached the top of Mount Taygetus in their raging madness, they were transformed into rocks.

== See also ==
- Pentheus
- Psalacantha
- Metamorphoses in Greek mythology

== Bibliography ==
- Maurus Servius Honoratus, In Vergilii carmina comentarii. Servii Grammatici qui feruntur in Vergilii carmina commentarii; recensuerunt Georgius Thilo et Hermannus Hagen. Georgius Thilo. Leipzig. B. G. Teubner. 1881. Online version available at perseus.tufts.
- Smith, William (1873). John Murray (ed.). A Dictionary of Greek and Roman Biography and Mythology. New-Street Square and Parliament Street, London: Spottiswoode and Co.
