= Talaus (spider) =

Scientific classification
- Kingdom: Animalia
- Phylum: Arthropoda
- Subphylum: Chelicerata
- Class: Arachnida
- Order: Araneae
- Infraorder: Araneomorphae
- Family: Thomisidae
- Genus: Talaus; Simon, 1886

Type species
- Talaus triangulifer Simon, 1886

Species
- See text

Diversity
- 13 species

Genus of spiders

Talaus is a genus of crab spiders in the family Thomisidae, containing thirteen species.

== Species ==
Benjamin (2020) assumes that the South African species T. limbatus is probably misplaced in this genus.

- Talaus beccarii Benjamin, 2020 — Malaysia (Borneo)
- Talaus dulongjiang Tang, Yin, Ubick & Peng, 2008 — China
- Talaus elegans Thorell, 1890 — Indonesia (Sumatra)
- Talaus limbatus Simon, 1895 — South Africa
- Talaus nanus Thorell, 1890 — Myanmar, Malaysia (Borneo), Indonesia (Java)
- Talaus niger Tang, Yin, Ubick & Peng, 2008 — China
- Talaus oblitus O. P.-Cambridge, 1899 — Sri Lanka
- Talaus opportunus (O. P.-Cambridge, 1873) — Sri Lanka
- Talaus samchi Ono, 2001 — Bhutan
- Talaus semicastaneus Simon, 1909 — Vietnam
- Talaus sulcus Tang & Li, 2010 — China
- Talaus triangulifer Simon, 1886 — Malaysia (Borneo), Indonesia (Borneo, Sumatra)
- Talaus xiphosus Zhu & Ono, 2007 — China
