= Carya of Laconia =

Daughter of Dion

In Greek mythology, Carya or Karya (Ancient Greek: Καρυά ) was a Laconian princess as the daughter of the King Dion.

== Family ==
Carya's mother was Amphithea, daughter of Pronax of Argos. Her sisters were Lyco and Orphe.

== Mythology ==
Apollo, in reward for Dion and Amphithea receiving him with great reverence and hospitality, bestowed a gift of prophecy upon their daughters, but imposed a restriction that they should not betray gods nor search after forbidden lore.

Later, Dionysus also paid a visit to Dion's house and was received with equal hospitality; during his stay, he fell in love with Carya and lay with her secretly. He then left but, missing Carya, soon returned under pretext of consecrating a temple which Dion had built for him. But Lyco and Orphe, suspecting a love affair between Dionysus and their sister, guarded Carya to prevent her from having intercourse with the god. By doing so they committed a violation of the restrictions imposed by Apollo, so Dionysus, after several warnings and threats, drove the two sisters mad, in which state they ran off to Mount Taygetus, where they were transformed into rocks. Carya was changed by Dionysus into a walnut tree (Greek karya). From these circumstances later arose the local cult of Artemis Caryatis.

== See also ==
- List of Greek deities
