= Lysimache =

Disambiguation article

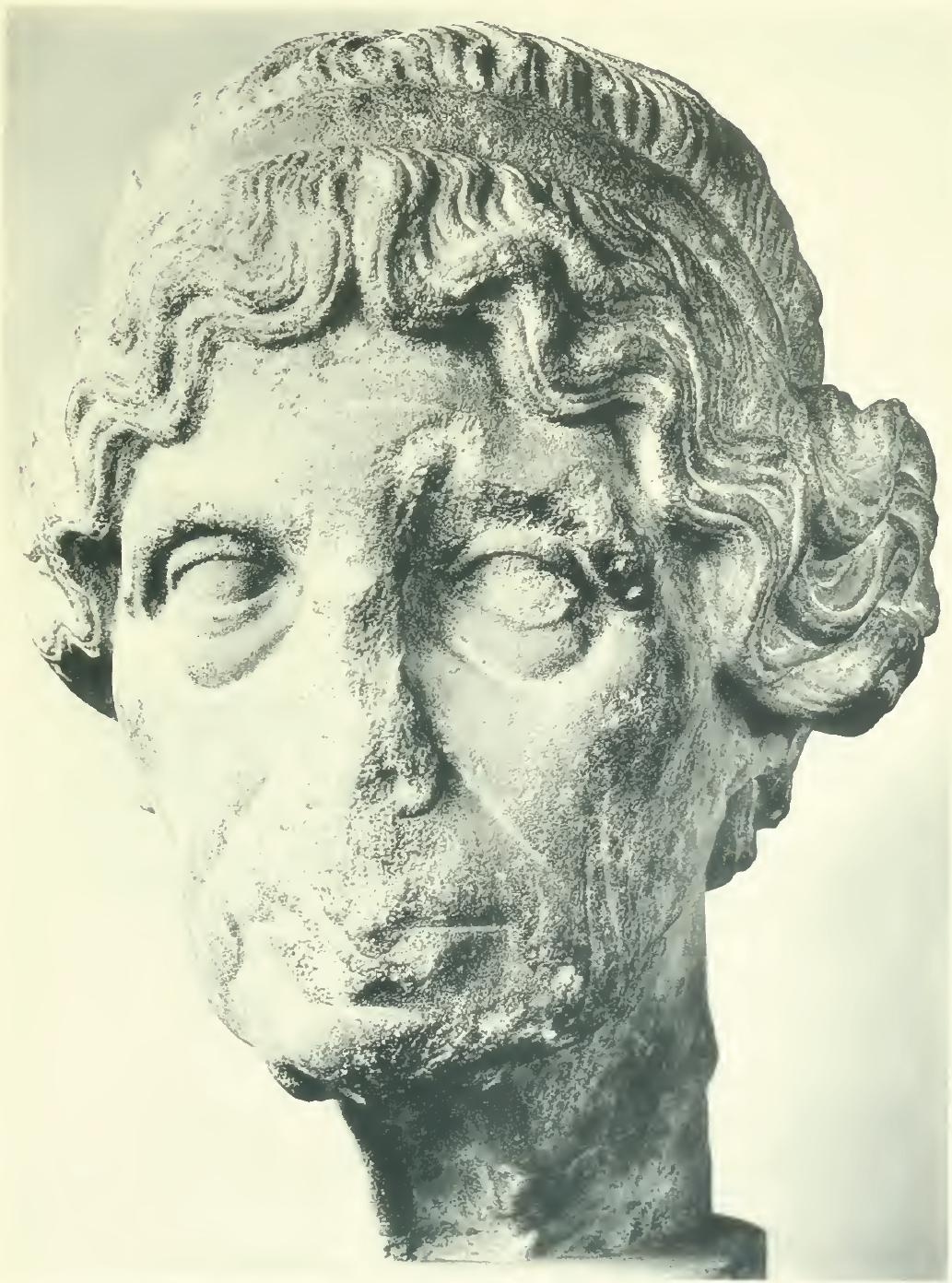
Marble portrait head of an old woman, sometimes identified as Lysimache, priestess of Athena.

Lysimache (/laɪˈsɪməkiː/; Ancient Greek: Λυσιμάχη; gen.: Λυσιμάχης, romanized: Lusimákhē, lit. 'releaser of battle' or 'scattering the battle') is the name of three characters in Greek mythology and history:

- Lysimache, daughter of Abas, son of Melampus. She married king Talaus of Argos and bore him these children: Adrastus, Mecisteus, Hippomedon, Pronax, Aristomachus, and Eriphyle.
- Lysimache, a daughter of Priam, king of Troy.
- Lysimache, daughter of Drakontides of Bate. She was a high priestess of Athena Polias, serving as such for 64 years (430–365 BCE).
