= Deipyle =

Multiple people in Greek mythology

In Greek mythology, Deipyle (Ancient Greek: Δηιπύλη, Dēipulē) may refer to:

- Deipyle, daughter of Adrastus and Amphithea, wife of Tydeus and mother of Diomedes. Her sister Argea married Polynices. Servius and Hyginus call her Deiphile.
- Deipyle or Deityche (Δηιτύχη), mother of Eurypylus by Euaemon. In some accounts, the consort of Euaemon was called Ops.
