= Adrastus =

Ancient Greek mythological king of Argos

An Attic red-figure amphoriskos (flask) depicting Adrastus in his chariot; c. 420 BCE, Metropolitan Museum of Art.

In Greek mythology, Adrastus or Adrestus (Ancient Greek: Ἄδραστος or Ἄδρηστος, perhaps meaning "the inescapable") was a king of Argos, and leader of the Seven against Thebes. He was the son of the Argive king Talaus, but was forced out of Argos by his dynastic rival Amphiaraus. He fled to Sicyon, where he became king. Later, he reconciled with Amphiaraus and returned to Argos as its king.

Because of an oracle, Adrastus married his daughters to the exiles Polynices and Tydeus and promised to restore them to their homelands. He first assembled an army to place Polynices on the throne of Thebes, led by seven champions, famously called the Seven against Thebes. The expedition failed, and all the champions died except Adrastus, saved by his divine horse Arion. He went with the Epigoni, the sons of the Seven, in the successful second war against Thebes, and was said to have died on his way home.

Adrastus is mentioned as early as Homer's Iliad, and his story was (presumably) told in the Cyclic Thebaid. He figures prominently in the poetry of Pindar, and is a main character in Euripides' The Suppliants. His story was told by Diodorus Siculus, Hyginus, Statius, and Apollodorus. He was said to be the founder of the Nemean Games, had hero cults at Sicyon, Megara, and Colonus, and was depicted in works of art from as early as the 6th century BC.

== Family ==
Homer's Iliad mentions Adrastus, but without giving any ancestry. The Hesiodic Catalogue of Women (without mentioning Adrastus) has Talaus as the son of Bias and Pero, and from the lyric poets Bacchylides and Pindar we first hear that Adrastus was the son of Talaus, who according to Apollonius of Rhodes was an Argonaut. No early sources say who Adrastus' mother was; however, late sources give three different names: Lysimache, the daughter of Abas, Lysianassa, the daughter of Polybus, or Eurynome. The Iliad mentions a daughter of Adrastus, Aegiale, and the logographer Hellanicus of Lesbos mentions a son, Aegialeus.

The mythographer Apollodorus gives the following genealogy. Adrastus' father was Talus, who was the son of Bias and Pero. His mother was Lysimache, the daughter of Abas, son of Melampus. He had four younger brothers, Parthenopaeus, Pronax, Mecisteus, and Aristomachus, and a sister Eriphyle. Adrastus married Amphithea, the daughter of his brother Pronax, by whom he had three daughters, Argia, Deipyle, and Aegiale, and two sons, Aegialeus and Cyanippus.

Adrastus' daughters had several notable husbands and sons. Argia married Polynices, the son of the Thebean king Oedipus, and Deipyle married Tydeus, the son of the Calydonian king Oeneus. According to Hyginus, Diomedes, who fought in the Trojan War, was the son of Deipyle and Tydeus, and Thersander (one of the Epigoni) was the son of Argia and Polynices. In the Iliad, another of Adrastus' daughters, Aegiale, is the wife of Diomedes. Hyginus, also says that Hippodamia, the wife of King Pirithous of the Lapiths, was the daughter of an Adrastus, possibly referring to this Adrastus.

== Mythology ==
The Iliad refers to Adrastus as king of Sicyon, but does not explain how a son of the Argive king Talaus, came to rule Sicyon. However, later sources tell of a dispute, of some sort, between the descendants of Bias and his brother Melampus— two of the most powerful families in the Argolid— involving Adrastus, the grandson of Bias, and Amphiaraus, the son of Oicles, a grandson of Melampus. According to Pindar, at one time the sons of Talaus ruled Argos but were "overpowered by discord," and Adrastus fled Argos and went to Sicyon to escape Amphiaraus, and during his reign there, he founded the Sicyonian games.

Pindar does not say what circumstances caused Adrastus to flee from Argos to Sicyon, or how he became its king, but later sources do. According to one version, after Adrastus' brother Pronax, who was king of Argos, died, Adrastus fled to Sicyon, where his mother's father Polybus was king, and eventually inherited the Sicyonian throne. While according to another, Adrastus fled to Sicyon after Amphiaraus killed Talaus, and got the throne by marrying Polybus' daughter.

In any case, Adrastus became king of Sicyon. Then, according to Pindar, Adrastus (and his brothers) were able to effect a reconciliation with Amphiaraus by giving him their sister Eriphyle in marriage, and Adrastus was able to return to Argos and assume the Argive throne.

Adrastus was the owner of the fabulously fast horse Arion, who was the offspring of Posidon and Demeter when they mated in horse form. Adrastus was given Arion by Heracles, and the horse saved Adrastus' life during the war of the Seven against Thebes, when all the other champions of the expedition were killed.

Adrastus seems to have had a reputation as a skillful speaker.

=== Seven against Thebes ===
The war of the Seven against Thebes resulted from a quarrel between Oedipus' sons Polynices and Eteocles over the kingship of Thebes, which left Eteocles on the throne, and Polynices in exile. One night, Polynices arrived at Adrastus' palace seeking shelter. He found a place to sleep, but soon after Tydeus, the exiled son of the Calydonian king Oeneus, also arrived seeking shelter, and the two began to fight over the same space. When Adrastus discovered Polynices and Tydeus fighting like wild beasts (or in later accounts when he saw that Polynices wore the hyde of a lion and that Tydeus wore the Hyde of a Boar, or that they had those animals on their shields), he remembered an oracle of Apollo that said he should marry his daughters to a lion and a boar. So Adrastus gave his daughters, Argia to Polynices, and Deipyle to Tydeus, and promised to restore them to their kingdoms, beginning with Polynices.

Adrastus proceeded to assemble a large Argive army to attack Thebes, appointing seven champions to be its leaders. These became known as the Seven against Thebes. One of those chosen, the seer Amphiaraus, had foreseen that the expedition was doomed to fail, and that all of the champions but Adrastus would die, and so refused to join. But when Polynices bribed Amphiaraus' wife Eriphyle to tell her husband to join the expedition, he was forced to obey because of a promise Amphiaraus had made to allow his wife, who was also Adrastus' sister, to settle any disputes between the two men.

Adrastus and his army were forced to stop for water at Nemea, where they became involved in the death of the child-hero Opheltes. There, Adrastus held funeral games in Opheltes' honor, in which he won the horse race with his horse Arion. These games were said to have been the origin of the Nemean Games.

As the seer Amphiaraus had foretold, the expedition ended in disaster at Thebes. All of the champions perished, except for Adrastus who was saved by the speed of his divine horse Arion. According to accounts first occurring in fifth-century BC Greek tragedy, after the failed assault on Thebes, Creon, who, with the death of Etecles, became the new ruler of Thebes, forbade the burial of the expedition's dead. Athenian tradition held that Theseus, the king and founder-hero of Athens, assisted Adrastus in recovering the bodies of his fallen comrades.

=== One of the "Seven" ===
Prior to the fifth century BC, the number and names of the "seven" champions is uncertain. The first certain reference to the number of champions being seven, along with a list of their names, occurs in Aeschylus' Seven Against Thebes. Adrastus— although present at the battle— is not considered by Aeschylus to be one of the "Seven". The same list of names is given in Euripides' The Suppliants, and Sophocles' Oedipus at Colonus. However, Euripides gives a slightly different list in The Phoenician Women, with Adrastus (instead of Eteoclus) as one of the Seven, and this list will be followed by the Greek historian Diodorus Siculus, the mythographers Apollodorus and Hyginus, and the Latin poet Statius. In The Phoenician Women and Apollodorus (as in the Seven Against Thebes) each of the Seven is assigned to one of the seven gates of Thebes, with Adrastus being assigned the "Seventh" gate, in The Phoenician Women, and the "Homoloidian" gate in Apollodorus.

=== Second war against Thebes ===
Ten years after the failed expedition against Thebes, to avenge their father's deaths, the sons of the fallen Seven, who were called the Epigoni ("Afterborn"), marched again on Thebes. Adrastus accompanied them on this second Theban expedition, called the war of the Epigoni. This time (according to Pindar) the omens foretold success for the expedition, but death for Adrastus' son Aegialeus. According to Hyginus, as Adrastus was the only one of the Seven to survive the first expedition, his son Aegialeus was the only one of the Epigoni to die in the second.

=== Death ===
According to Pausanias, the Megarians said that Adrastus, leading the Argive army home after taking Thebes, died at Megara of old age and grief for the death of his son, and was honored there. However, Hyginus says that, in accordance with an oracle of Apollo, Adrastus and his son Hipponous killed themselves by throwing themselves into a fire.

== Principal sources ==
=== The Iliad, Stesichorus, and the Thebaid ===
There are only a few surviving references to Adrastus before the 5th century BC. The Iliad has four passing mentions of Adrastus. It describes him as being "at the first" the king of Sicyon, and his "swift horse" Arion, being "of heavenly stock". It mentions his daughter Aegiale being the wife of Diomedes, and another daughter of his marrying Tydeus.

The lyric poet Stesichorus (c. 630 – 555 BC) apparently wrote a poem (now lost) about the war against Thebes, in which Adrastus would presumably have figured. A fragment from the poem mentions Adrastus giving a daughter to Polynices.

The Cyclic Thebaid (early sixth century BC?) was a Greek epic poem whose entire subject was the Seven's Theban war, however only a few fragments have survived. One fragment has Adrastus being the only one saved at Thebes, thanks to his horse Arion. Another fragment has Adrastus lamenting the death of Amphiaraus. Much of the later tradition concerning Adrastus probably derives from this work.

=== Pindar ===
The 5th-century lyric poet Pindar mentions Adrastus in several of his poems. He devotes twenty lines of his Nemian 9 to Adrastus, and the expedition of the Seven against Thebes. He begins by praising Adrastus as the founder of the Sicyonian games, which Pindar says Adrastus did during his reign as king of Sicyon:

Let us rouse up, then, the resounding lyre and rouse the pipe for the very apex of contests
for horses, which Adrastus established for Phoebus by the streams of Asopus. Having mentioned them,
I shall exalt the hero with fame-bringing honors,
who, reigning there [Sicyon] at that time, made the city famous
by glorifying it with new festivals and contests for men's strength and with polished chariots.

He then tells of a dispute between Adrastus and the seer Amphiaraus, which resulted in Adrastus and his brothers being overthrown, and Adrastus fleeing Argos:

For in time past, to escape bold-counseling Amphiaraus and terrible civil strife, he had fled
from his ancestral home and Argos. No longer were Talaus’ [Adrastus' father] sons rulers; they had been overpowered by discord.

And how Adrastus and Amphiaraus were reconciled by Adrastus giving his sister Eriphyle to Ampiaraus:

But the stronger man puts an end to a former dispute.
After giving man-subduing Eriphyle as a faithful pledge
to Oecles’ son [Amphiaraus] for a wife, they became the greatest of the fair-haired Danaans . . .

After which, Adrastus was a leader of the disastrous ill-omened expedition of the Seven against Thebes:

and later they led an army of men to seven-gated Thebes
on a journey with no favorable omens, and Cronus’ son brandished his lightning and urged them not to set out
recklessly from home, but to forgo the expedition.

But after all, the host was eager to march, with bronze
weapons and cavalry gear, into obvious disaster, and on the banks of the Ismenus
they laid down their sweet homecoming and fed the white-flowering smoke with their bodies,
for seven pyres feasted on the men's young limbs. But for Amphiaraus’ sake, Zeus split the deep-bosomed
earth with his almighty thunderbolt and buried him with his team,

before being struck in the back by Periclymenus' spear
and suffering disgrace in his warrior spirit.

Pindar attributes the founding of the Nemean Games to Adrastus. And, after the death of Amphiaraus, Pindar has Adrastus say: "I dearly miss the eye of my army, good both as a seer and at fighting with the spear."

In Pythian 8, Pindar mentions Adrastus receiving a prophecy from the dead Amphiaraus during the battle of the Epigoni at Thebes:

... he who suffered in a former defeat,
the hero Adrastus,
is now met with news
of better omen, but in his own household
he will fare otherwise: for he alone from the Danaan army
will gather the bones of his dead son and with the favor
of the gods will come with his host unharmed

=== The Suppliants ===
Adrastus is a principal character in Euripides' tragedy The Suppliants (c. 420 BC). The action of the play takes place after the disastrous defeat of the Seven against Thebes, and the refusal of Creon, the new Theban king, to allow the burial of the expedition's dead. Adrastus has come to Eleusis seeking the Athenians' help in recovering the bodies of the fallen warriors.

In the play we hear for the first time an account of why Adrastus made war on Thebes. In an initial interview, Adrastus tells Theseus, the king of Athens, that because of an oracle of Apollo, he had given his daughters (unnamed) to Polynices and Theseus, and that, because of the "crime" done to Polynices by his brother Eteocles, who had stolen "his property" (i.e. the Theban throne), Adrastus marched "seven companies against Thebes". Theseus then asks Adrastus whether he consulted seers and the gods before making war on Thebes, and Adrastus answers that, not only did he go to war "without the gods’ good will", he also "went against the wish of Amphiaraus."

Finally persuaded to help recover the dead, Theseus leads an Athenian army to Thebes, where he defeats the Thebans in battle and brings back the dead warriors to Eleusis. Adrastus then, in a long speech of 60 lines, eulogizes the fallen champions.

=== Late sources ===
The Greek historian Diodorus Siculus (first century BC), the Roman mythographer Hyginus (c. 64 BC – AD 17), the Latin poet Statius (c. 45—c. 96), and the Greek mythographer Apollodorus (first or second century AD), all gave accounts of Adrastus' story.

==== Diodorus Siculus ====
According to Diodorus Siculus, Polynices fled Thebes, when Eteocles refused to give up the kingship, as had been agreed, and Tydeus fled Calydon, after killing his cousins. The two princes came to Argos where "Adrastus received both the fugitives kindly". As in Euripides, because of an oracle, Adrastus married his daughters Argia to Polynices and Deipyle to Tydeus, and promised to restore the exiles to their native kingdoms. Adrastus decided to deal with Thebes first. So he sent his son-in-law Tydeus on an embassy to negotiate a peaceful return for Polynices. Upon learning of the failure of Tydeus' mission, Adrastus began organizing an expedition against Thebes.

The seer Amphiaraus refused to take part, at first, because he knew if he did he would die. But Polynices gave Amphiaraus's wife Eriphyle the necklace of Harmonia, so that she would persuade her husband to join the expedition. Diodorus reports that "at the time" Adrastus and Amphiaraus were "at variance ... striving for the kingship", and they agreed that Eriphyle, Adrastus' sister and Amphiaraus's wife, would settle the matter. And when Eriphyle "awarded the victory to Adrastus" saying that the expedition "should be undertaken", Amphiaraus agreed to go.

Adrastus recruited Capaneus, Hippomedon and Parthenopaeus, the son of Atalanta, to join himself, Polynices, Tydeus, and Amphiaraus as the seven leaders of the "notable army", the same list of Seven as in Euripides' The Phoenician Women. Omitting any mention of the Seven's stop at Nemea, Diodorus next gives an account of the battle at Thebes. As always, all of the Seven died, except Adrastus. As for the burial of the Seven, Diodorus (with no mention of Creon or Theseus) says that the Thebans refused to allow Adrastus to remove the dead, so he went home to Argos, and (as in Euripides' The Suppliants) the Athenians recovered the bodies and buried them.

==== Hyginus ====
In his Fabulae, Hyginus gives an account of Adrastus' story, mostly in accord with earlier sources. Following Bacchylides, Pindar, and Euripides, Hyginus says that Adrastus was the son of Talaus, however Hyginus provides the name of a mother, Eurynome. Following Euripides, Hyginus says that Adrastus had received an oracle of Apollo which said he would marry his daughters to a lion and a boar, and that, when Polynices, wearing the hide of a lion, and Tydeus, wearing the hide of a boar, arrived at Adrastus' court, Adrastus remembered the oracle and so married his older daughter, Argia, to Polynices, and his younger daughter Deipyle, to Tydeus. He adds that Thersander (one of the Epigoni) was the son of Argia and Polynices, and that Diomedes (who fought at Troy, and another of the Epigoni) was the son of Deipyle and Tydeus.

At Polynices request, Adrastus assembled an army to take back the kingship of Thebes from Eteocles. Adrastus chose "seven generals" (including himself) for the army because the walls of Thebes had seven gates. The army stops at Nemea in search of water, Opheltes is killed by a snake, Adrastus and the Seven kill the snake and establish funeral games in the child's honor. At Thebes, all of the Seven die except Adrastus.

==== Statius ====
Just as the Cyclic Thebaid had been, the Latin poet Statius's Thebaid (c. 92 AD), is devoted entirely to the Seven against Thebes. An epic poem in 12 books, it gives the most detailed account of Adrastus' story.

In Book 1, the situations at Thebes and Argos are described. In Thebes, Polynices and Eteocles having agreed to rule in alternate years, Eteocles occupies the throne, while Polynices is in exile for a year. While in Argos:

There king Adrastus governed his people in tranquillity, verging from life's midway into old age. Rich was he in ancestry, back to Jove on either side. The better sex he lacked, but flourished in female offspring, supported by twin pledge of daughters. To him Phoebus prophesied (a deadly prodigy to tell, but the truth of it was soon revealed) that husbands for them were on their way by fate's leading: a bristly pig and a tawny lion. That pondering, neither the father himself nor Amphiaraus skilled in futurity sees light, for Apollo the source forbids. Only in the parental heart anxiety sits and festers.

One night, during a raging storm, Polynices and Tydeus (also an exile) separately arrive at Adrastus' palace in Argos seeking refuge. They quarrel over the same bit of shelter, a fight breaks out, Adrastus is awoken, and separates them. He invites the two inside, and notices that Polynices wears a lion's pelt and that Tydeus a boar's skin and tusks, and by these signs, Adrastus recognizes in Polynices and Tydeus, the husbands that had been prophesied for his two daughters. Adrastus feasts the young princes and introduces them to his daughters.

The next day, in Book 2, Polynices and Tydeus accept Adrastus' offer of his daughters Argia and Deipyle in marriage, and Adrastus promises to help the two exiles regain their native kingdoms. Adrastus sends Tydeus to Thebes to see if Eteocles will peacefully surrender his crown. At Thebes, Eteocles rejects Tydeus' arguments that, since his year of rule is over, he should give over the kingship to Polynices. On his way back to Argos, Tydeus is ambushed by fifty Thebans, and kills all of these but Maeon.

In Book 3, on returning to Argos, the wounded Tydeus urges an immediate attack of Thebes, an action the angry crowd supports. But addressing Polynices, Adrastus "deep of counsel and no novice in manipulating the weight of command" urges restraint:

Leave all this, I pray you, to the High Ones and my care for remedy. Neither shall your brother wield the sceptre and you fail of satisfaction nor yet are we eager to let war loose. But now all welcome Oeneus’ noble son triumphing in so great a bloodshed. Let rest at last relax his courageous spirit. For my part indignation shall not go short of reason

Adrastus consults the seers Amphiaraus and Melampus who receive omens too terrifying to divulge. Meanwhile, the Argives eagerly arm themselves, and at "the sad kings door" demand war. Amphiaraus is finally forced to reveal what he has foreseen: death and defeat at Thebes, but the Argives are undeterred. Argia, now Polynices' wife, tearfully urges her father Adrastus to make war on Thebes, who begins assembling an army.

In Book 4, the expedition sets out from Argos with Adrastus leading the first of the seven contingents:

King Adrastus, sad and sick with weight of cares and nearer to departing years, walks scarce of his own accord amid words of good cheer, content with the steel that girds his side; soldiers bear his shield behind him. His driver grooms the swift horses right at the gate and Arion is already fighting the yoke. ... This band, three thousand strong, follows Adrastus exulting. ... He himself joins them, venerable alike in years and sceptre, like a bull moving tall among the pastures he has long possessed; his neck is slack now and his shoulders empty, but still he is the leader; the steers have no stomach to attempt him in battle, for they see his horns broken from many a blow and the massive nodules of breast wounds.

In desperate need of water the expedition is forced to stop at Nemea. There they encounter Hypsipyle, the nurse of the infant Opheltes, and Adrastus urgently asks her to lead them to water, which she does.

Meanwhile, in Book 5, the unattended Opheltes is killed by a serpent, and the infant's father the king, holding Hypsipyle responsible, intends to kill her with his sword. The Archive champions rush to defend Hypsipyle—their army's savior—and Nemeans rally to their king, but Adrastus and Amphiaraus intercede, preventing an armed clash. A rumor of Hypsipyle's imminent death reaches the Archive army, and they attack the palace, but Adrastus is able to stop them by racing to the palace with Hypsipyle in his chariot to show his army that she is safe.

In Book 6, Adrastus presides over games held in honor of Opheltes. As a final honor, Adrastus is asked to give a display of his prowess with the bow or spear. He gladly complies, choosing a tree a great distance away as a target. Adrastus shoots an arrow, which hits the tree, but bounces all the way back to his feet. An ill omen: "the shaft promised its master a war from which he alone would return, a sad homecoming."

In Book 7, the expedition arrives at Thebes, and the fighting begins and continues through Book 11. One by one each of the Seven champions die, all except Polynices and Adrastus. The brothers Polynices and Eteocles, having agreed to fight in single combat to decide the war, Adrastus drives his chariot between them and tries to stop them:

Sons of Inachus and Tyrians, shall we then watch this wickedness? Where is right and the gods, where war? Persist not in your passion. I pray you desist, my enemy—though did this anger permit, you too are not far from me in blood; you, my son-in-law, I also command. If you so much desire a sceptre, I put off my royal raiment, go, have Lerna and Argos to yourself.

But when Polynices and Eteocles refuse to stop, Adrastus flees:

leaving it all behind—camp, men, son-in-law, Thebes—and drives Arion on as he turns in the yoke and warns of Fate.

==== Apollodorus ====
Apollodorus also gives an account of Adrastus story. Apollodorus gives the following genealogy:

Bias and Pero had a son Talaus, who married Lysimache, daughter of Abas, son of Melampus, and had by her Adrastus, Parthenopaeus, Pronax, Mecisteus, Aristomachus, and Eriphyle, whom Amphiaraus married. Parthenopaeus had a son Promachus, who marched with the Epigoni against Thebes; and Mecisteus had a son Euryalus, who went to Troy. Pronax had a son Lycurgus; and Adrastus had by Amphithea, daughter of Pronax, three daughters, Argia, Deipyle, and Aegialia, and two sons, Aegialeus and Cyanippus.

According to Apollodorus, Polynices, being banished from Thebes by Eteocles, came to Argos one night and fought with Tydeus. They were heard by Adrastus, who separated them. Adrastus, noticing their shields, one with a lion and the other a boar, remembered an oracle which told him that he should marry his daughters to "a boar and a lion", and married his daughters Argia and Deipyle to the two young men. Adrastus promised to restore both his sons-in-law to their kingdoms, and "eager to march against Thebes" first, began to assembled an army.

The seer Amphiaraus, having foreseen that all, except Adrastus, who went to Thebes were destined to die, at first refused to join Adrastus' expedition. But, as part of the resolution of an old dispute between Adrastus and Amphiaraus, Adrastus' sister Eriphyle had married Amphiaraus, and Amphiaraus had promised to let Eriphyle decide any future disputes between the two men. So, when Polynices bribed Amphiaraus' wife Eriphyle to tell her husband to join the expedition, he was forced to obey. In addition to himself, his son-in-laws Polynices and Tydeus, and his brother-in-law Amphiaraus, Adrastus chose Capaneus, Hippomedon (who Apollodorus says according to some accounts was a brother of Adrastus), and Parthenopaeus, to be the seven leaders of the expedition against Thebes. However, as Apollodorus notes, some do not count Polynices and Tydeus as being among the seven, instead including Eteoclus, son of Iphis, and Mecisteus (another brother of Adrastus) in the list of the seven.

At Thebes, when Capaneus was killed by Zeus' thunderbolt, Adrastus, and the rest of the Argive army fled, but "Adrastus alone was saved by his horse Arion". When Creon forbade the burial of the Argive dead, Arastus having "fled to Athens and took refuge at the altar of Mercy, and laying on it the suppliant's bough he prayed that they would bury the dead", and Theseus and the Athenians captured Thebes and recovered the dead.

== Hero cult ==
Adrastus had hero cults at Sicyon, Megara and Kolonos. According to Herodotus, Adrastus had a hero shrine (heroon) in the marketplace at Sicyon, and, up until the reign of Cleisthenes of Sicyon (c. 600–560 BC), was celebrated there with "sacrifices and festivals" and "tragic choruses". Pausanias says that Adrastus was "honored" at Megara, where presumably his tomb could be seen. Pausanias also mentions a hero shrine at Kolonos in Attica.

== Iconography ==
Adrastus appears in vase painting as early as the late 6th century BC. A Chalcidian calyx krater (c. 530 BC) depicts the arrival scene of the exiled princes Polynices and Tydeus at Adrastus' palace. On the right Adrastus (identified by inscription) reclines on a couch, with a woman (his wife?) standing beside him. They are both looking to the left where Tydeus (also named) and another man (presumed to be Polynices) are sitting on the ground with their mantles wrapped around them, with two women conversing standing over them (Adrastus' daughters?).

Pausanias reports seeing Adrastus depicted on the Amyclae Throne of Apollo (6th century BC), along with Tydeus, stopping a fight between Amphiaraus and "Lycurgus the son of Pronax". The same scene seems to have been depicted on a shield-strap from Olympia (B 1654), as well as on a fragment from a Laconian cup by the Hunt Painter.

Adrastus appears on an Etruscan gem from the first half of the 5th century BC (Berlin:Ch GI 194). With Adrastus are four of the Seven champions: Parthenopaeus, Amphiaraus, Polynices and Tydeus. Adrastus and Tydeus are standing, in arms, with the rest seated. Pausanias also describes seeing a monument (c. 450s BC?) at Delphi which depicted the Seven, and included Adrastus.

== Pallor of Adrastus ==
A line in Virgil's Aeneid has Aeneas, in the underworld, encounter "the pale shade of Adrastus" (Adrasti pallentis imago). Servius, in his commentary, says this was in reference to Adrastus turning pale at the sight of the deaths at Thebes. The "pallor of Adrastus" apparently became proverbial.
