= Caryatis =

Epithet of Artemis

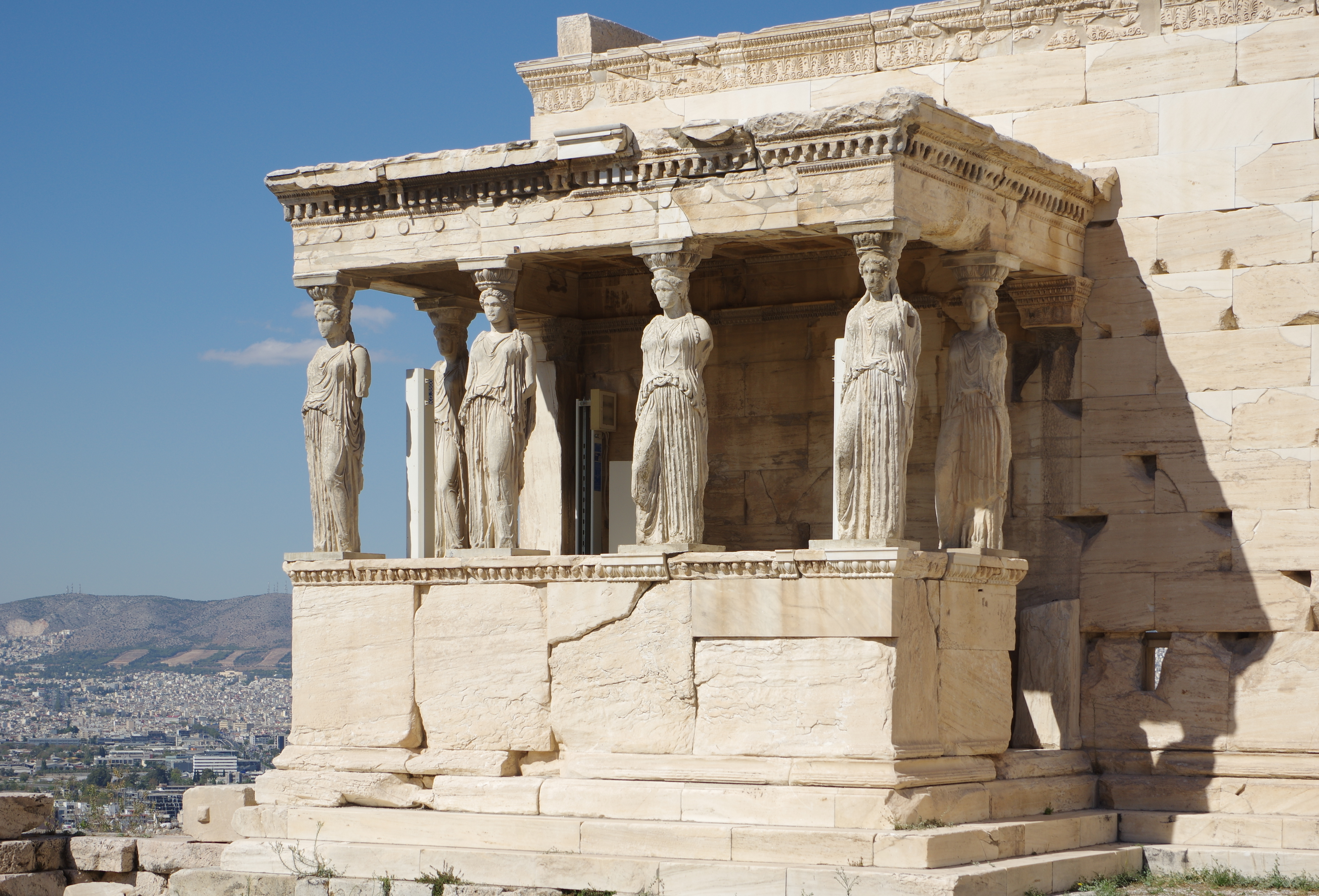
The Erechtheion in Athens, Greece.

In ancient Greek religion, Artemis Caryatis (Καρυᾶτις) was an epithet of Artemis that was derived from the small polis of Caryae in Laconia. There, an archaic open-air temenos was dedicated to Carya, the Lady of the Nut-Tree, whose priestesses were called the caryatides, represented on the Athenian Acropolis as the marble caryatids supporting the porch of the Erechtheum. The late accounts made of the eponymous Carya a virgin who had been transformed into a nut-tree, whether for her unchastity (with Dionysus) or to prevent her rape. The particular form of veneration of Artemis at Karyai suggests that in pre-classical ritual, Carya was the goddess of the nut tree who was later assimilated into the Olympian goddess Artemis. Pausanias noted that every year, women performed a dance called the caryatis at a festival in honor of Artemis Caryatis called the Caryateia.
