= Talaus elegans =

Scientific classification
- Kingdom: Animalia
- Phylum: Arthropoda
- Subphylum: Chelicerata
- Class: Arachnida
- Order: Araneae
- Infraorder: Araneomorphae
- Family: Thomisidae
- Genus: Talaus
- Species: T. elegans

Binomial name
- Talaus elegans Thorell, 1890

Synonyms
- Microcyllus elegans Thorell, 1892

Species of spider

Talaus elegans is a species of crab spiders in the family Thomisidae. It is found in Sumatra.
