= Myia (mythology) =

Mythological figure who became a fly

In Lucian of Samosata's works, Myia (Ancient Greek: Μυῖα, romanized: Muîa, lit. 'fly') is a young girl who fell in love with Endymion and was transformed by the lunar goddess Selene into a fly, a small insect bearing her name.

== Etymology ==
The ancient Greek noun μυῖα translates to 'fly', and is derived from the Proto-Indo-European root *mus-ih_{2}, thus being cognate with the Latin musca.

== Mythology ==
In his satirical second-century work Praising a Fly (Latin: Muscae Encomium, Ancient Greek: Μυίας ἐγκώμιον), author Lucian of Samosata (modern Samsat) related the—otherwise unattested—myth of Myia, an exceedingly fair but also very chatty young maiden who fell in love with Endymion, a very handsome mortal man who had been granted immortality via eternal slumber. With her endless chatter Myia would wake up Endymion, irritating him and enraging the moon goddess Selene, his lover. Selene then transformed the talkative girl into a fly, who annoys sleeping people to this day, in memory of her love and her deeds in her previous life.

== Culture ==
An ancient Greek proverb connected to this story was μυίης θάρσος (literally 'the fly's boldness'), said for those who were of excessive boldness.

Similarly to the myth of the boy-turned-rooster Alectryon (also surviving in the works of Lucian) Myia's story is an aetiological myth which nonetheless does not link its protagonist to a specific Greek place or lineage, with a starting point in another, more popular myth, rather than an animal-based cult. Likewise, it is impossible to say whether the myth is just an invention of Lucian's or a genuine popular fable about animals.

== See also ==
- Psalacantha
- Clytie
- Io
- Cerambus
