= Psalacantha =

Nymph in Greek mythology

In Greek mythology, Psalacantha (Ancient Greek: Ψαλάκανθα) was a nymph of the island Icaria, who later got turned into a plant by the god Dionysus.

== Mythology ==
According to Ptolemy Hephaestion, Psalacantha fell in love with Dionysus and promised to help him win the love of Ariadne on condition that he satisfy her own desires as well. Dionysus refused and Psalacantha went on to advise Ariadne against him, whereupon the god became enraged and changed Psalacantha into a plant known as psalakanthos. Later, he repented and decided to commemorate Psalacantha by having the plant worked into Ariadne's wreath, the one that was changed into the constellation Corona Borealis.

== History ==
The plant was used in Ancient Greece to honour the god Dionysus during festivals, along with the customary wine and grapes.

== See also ==
- Carya of Laconia
- Clytie
- Crocus
- Myia
