= Talaus oblitus =

Scientific classification
- Kingdom: Animalia
- Phylum: Arthropoda
- Subphylum: Chelicerata
- Class: Arachnida
- Order: Araneae
- Infraorder: Araneomorphae
- Family: Thomisidae
- Genus: Talaus
- Species: T. oblitus

Binomial name
- Talaus oblitus O. Pickard-Cambridge, 1899

Species of spider

Talaus oblitus, is a species of spider of the genus Talaus. It is endemic to Sri Lanka.

== See also ==
- List of Thomisidae species
