= Caryateia =

Ancient Greek festival in honor of Artemis

The Caryateia (Ancient Greek: Καρυάτεια) was an annual festival held at the ancient sanctuary of Artemis Caryatis in Karyes, Laconia, in honor of the goddess.

The festival had an agricultural character and was likely held before or after the summer harvest, as the faithful would seek to appease the goddess for a bountiful crop or to express their gratitude accordingly. During the festival, according to Pausanias: "Here, the maidens of the Lacedaemonians annually perform dances, and there is a local tradition of dancing...," where prominent maidens of Lacedaemon participated in the celebration as priestess-dancers of the goddess. These priestesses, with their beauty and stature, seem to have inspired the artists of the Classical period, who utilized the female figure type in art, particularly in architecture, which became widely known as Caryatids.

== Bibliography ==
- P. & I. Meintanis (1950). Karyatika: For the history of Karyai – Arachova, Laconia and the Arachovites abroad. New York: Anatolia. p. 28.
- Pausanias (1918). "§ 3.10.7". In W.H.S. Jones; H.A. Ormerod (eds.). Description of Greece. Vol. 4. Cambridge, MA; London: Harvard University Press; William Heinemann Ltd.
- Hesychius of Alexandria. "Caryai". Lexicon (in Greek).
