= Lysimache I =

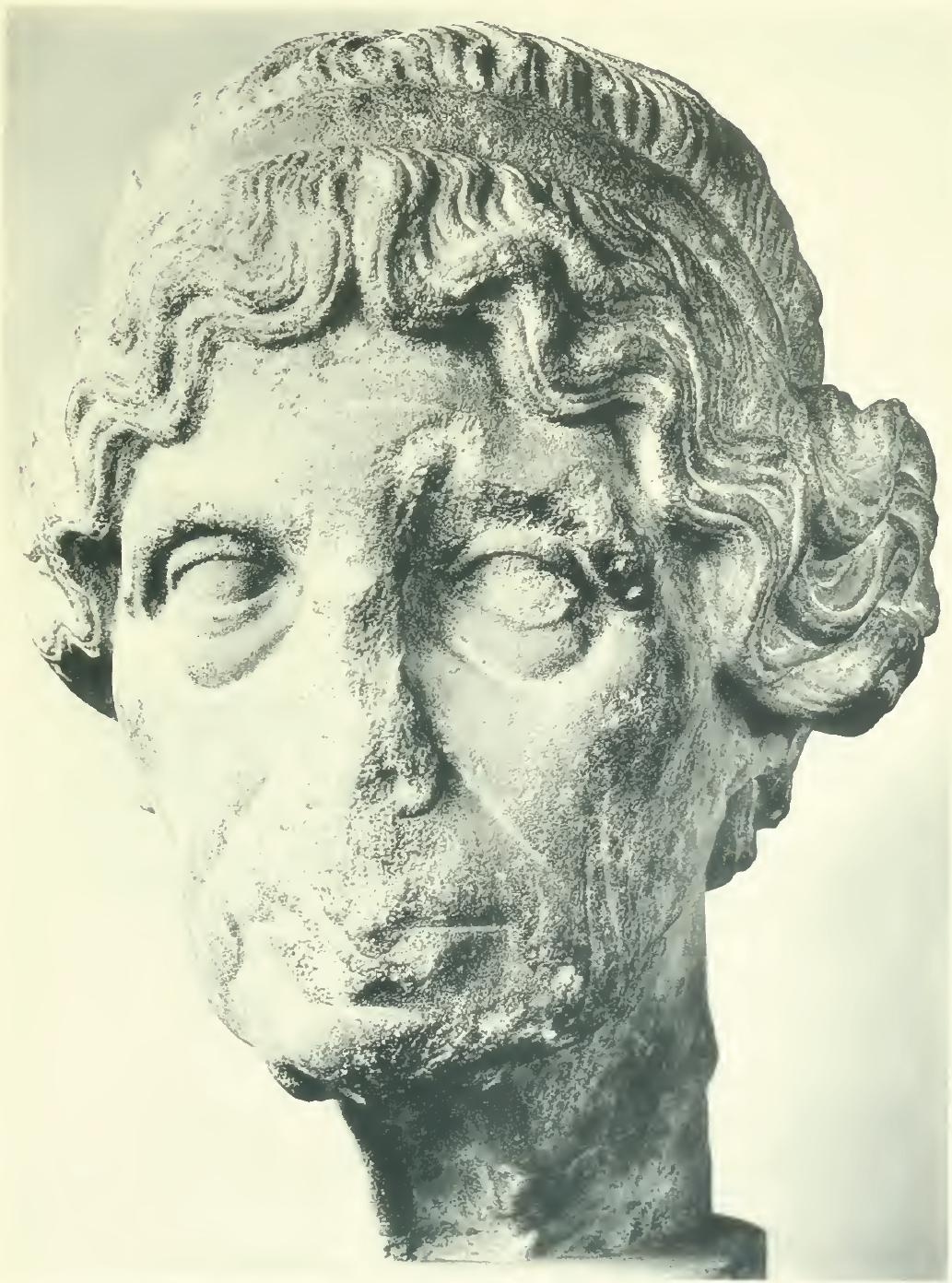
Marble portrait head of an old woman, sometimes identified as Lysimache, priestess of Athena.

Lysimache I (453 BC - 365 BC), was an Ancient Greek Athenian Priestess. She served as the High Priestess of Athena Polias in the Parthenon Temple of the Acropolis of Athens between 430 BC and 365 BC.

Lysimache was the daughter of Drakontides of Bate. She was a member of the Eteoboutadae family, in which the office of High Priestess was inherited.

Lysimache was invested in the office in 430 BC. As such she was the holder of the highest Priesthood office in Athens. She was the supervisor of the lesser roles in the cult: the Plyntrides, who performed the ritual wash of the Goddess' clothing; the Arrephoroi, who manufactured a new peplos for the statue of the Goddess every year; and the Kanephoroi, who were appointed to participate in the Panathenaia by the Arkon Basileus. Lysimache is the first High Priestess of whom significant documentation is preserved. While inscriptions and portrait statues were erected honouring each priestess, most of them have been destroyed except for hers. The office of High Priestess was an office for life; it was not a position that required celibacy, and Lysimache married, and had four children and became a widow during her tenure in office.

Her brother Lysikles was the city treasurer in 416-415, and together the siblings yielded a great deal of power in Athens. She has been referred to as Lysimache I, since Lysimache II, who were possibly the daughter of her nephew, had the office in the year 300.

Lysimache I has been referred to as the role model for the title characther “Lysistrata" by Aristophanes in 411; it was written during her tenure, and the author was known to caricature public office holders in his works.

från 411 (Aristofanes ska ha karikerat flera andra offentliga personer i sina verk).[1]
