= Pronax =

Character of the greek mythology

In Greek mythology, Pronax (/ˈproʊˌnæks/; Ancient Greek: Πρῶναξ) was one of the sons of Talaus and Lysimache, a brother of Adrastus and Eriphyle, and the father of Lycurgus and Amphithea. According to some accounts, he died before the war of the Seven against Thebes, and the Nemean Games were instituted in his honor.

== Mythology ==
=== Lycurgus ===
Pronax's son was perhaps the same Lycurgus that was said to have been raised from the dead by Asclepius. His son was also possibly the same as the Nemean Lycurgus who was the father of Opheltes. Although the mythographer Apollodorus distinguishes these two, saying that the Lycurgus, who was the father of Opheltes, was the son of Pheres, there is some evidence to suggest that, in some accounts, these two Lycurgoi were in fact the same. The geographer Pausanias reports seeing an image of Pronax's son Lycurgus on the Amyclae throne of Apollo. According to Pausanias, Adrastus and Tydeus, two of the Seven against Thebes, are shown stopping a fight between Lycurgus and Amphiaraus, another of the Seven. If this image depicted an event during the Seven's stop at Nemea, then this would presumably mean that, in some version of the story, Pronax's son was the father of Opheltes.

=== Amphithea ===
According to Athenaeus, the extravident clothing worn by those who came to court Pronax's daughter Amphithea, was mentioned by the 5th-century Greek tragedian Agathon. Pronax gave his daughter, Amphithea in marriage to his brother Adrastus, who was the king of Argos and leader of the Seven against Thebes. She and Adrastus had three daughters, Argia, Deipyle, and Aegialia, and two sons, Aegialeus and Cyanippus.
