= Talaus =

Figure from Greek Mythology

In Greek mythology, Talaus (/ˈtæliəs/; Ancient Greek: Ταλαός) was the king of Argos and one of the Argonauts. He was the son of Bias (or Perialces) and Pero, and brother of Arëius and Leodocus. His wife was Lysimache, daughter of Abas (also known as Eurynome, Lysippe or Lysianassa, daughter of Polybus). He was the father of Adrastus, Aristomachus, Astynome, Eriphyle, Mecisteus, Metidice, and Pronax.
