= Mecisteus (son of Talaus) =

Son of Talaus and Lysimache in ancient Greek mythology

In Greek mythology, Mecisteus (/məˈsɪsˌt(j)uːs/; Ancient Greek: Μηκιστεύς Mēkisteús) was the son of Talaus and Lysimache. He was the father of Euryalus by Astyoche.

== Mythology ==
Mecisteus participated in the attack on the city of Thebes with the Seven against Thebes, along with his brother Adrastus. In Aeschylus' tragedy Seven Against Thebes, Mecisteus is not among the seven champions who attack the seven gates of Thebes. The Bibliotheca, however, gives one version of the legend in which he replaces Tydeus as one of the seven. Herodotus also writes that he was one of the attackers, although whether one of the seven champions or simply another leader is not made clear. In the Iliad, it is said that Mecisteus attended the funeral games of Oedipus at Thebes, and won all the boxing matches.
