= Tiryns culture =

Early Bronze Age culture in Greece

- Period: Bronze Age
- Dates: c. 2200 BC – 2000 BC
- Preceded by: Korakou culture
- Followed by: Mycenaean civilization

Tiryns culture (2,200 - 2,000 BC) or Early Helladic III was an Early Bronze Age culture in Central Greece, Southern Greece and the Ionian islands (part of Western Greece) that followed the Eutresis and Korakou cultures and preceded the Mycenean civilization. The "center" of the culture was the settlement of Tiryns that saw further development during the Mycenean period. Around 2,000 BC, the Early Helladic period as a whole ended, and the Tiryns culture was succeeded by the Middle Helladic culture and Mycenaean Greece.

== Material culture ==
=== Metal and terracotta ===
A unique pattern-painted dark to light human figurine was found at the Tiryns culture's Lerna IV site, while older types of animal figurines do not continue. Metal became more popular for the creation of weapons and tools. Some examples of metal tool finds from this culture include a dagger, a nail, a pin from Lerna, and three axes from Thebes.

=== Pottery ===
The best known types of pottery from this era consist of two classes of pattern-painted ceramics:

- Patterned ware that is a dark on light class, mainly in the Peloponnese. The ornament is geometric and almost exclusively rectilinear.
- Ayia Marina ware that is a light on dark class, mainly in Central Greece. The ornament is similar to patterned ware. The dark paint on both wares is moderately lustrous and appears to be descended directly from the Urfirnis paint used in the Early Helladic II period.

== Architecture ==
At Lerna and Olympia, several "long houses" or megara with two or three rooms and narrow alleyways had been built. A tumulus was constructed over the ruins of the Helladic II House of the Tiles, and for a long period of time, no buildings were built in the specific area. Many large (for the period) buildings were constructed in Lerna, but they often lasted for only one generation.
