= Roof tiles =

Tile used to keep out rain

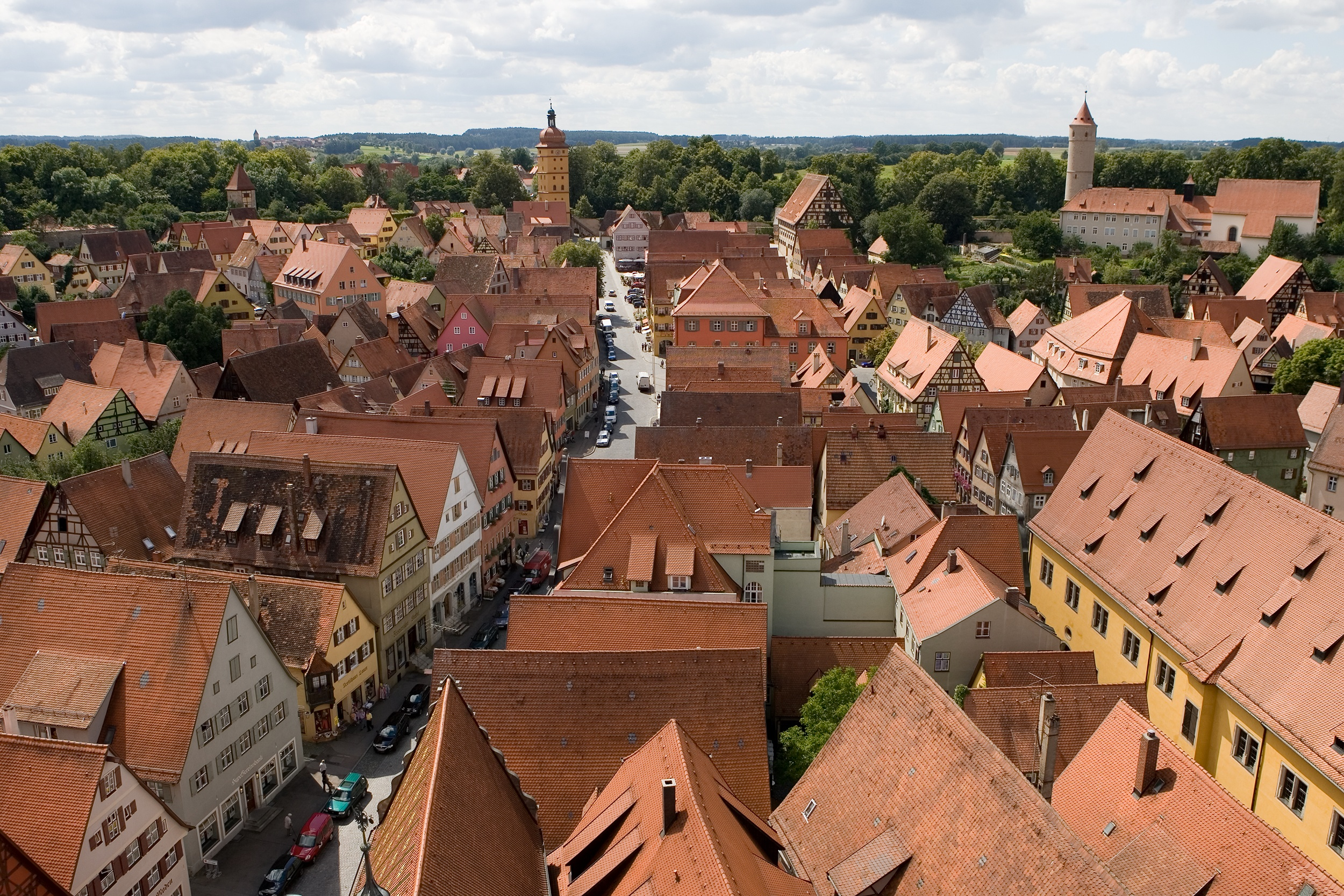
Clay tile roofs in Dinkelsbühl, Germany

Roof tiles are overlapping tiles designed mainly to keep out precipitation such as rain or snow, and are traditionally made from locally available materials such as clay or slate. Later tiles have been made from materials such as concrete, glass, and plastic.

Roof tiles can be affixed by screws, nails, wire clips, or self-supporting lugs and interlocking designs. In desert or tropical climates tiles are sometimes installed directly on laths and battens, but in temperate climates tiles are typically installed atop an underlayment system to protect the roof against water intrusion.

== Categories ==
There are numerous profiles, or patterns, of roof tile which can be separated into categories based on their installation and design.

=== Shingle / flat tiles ===
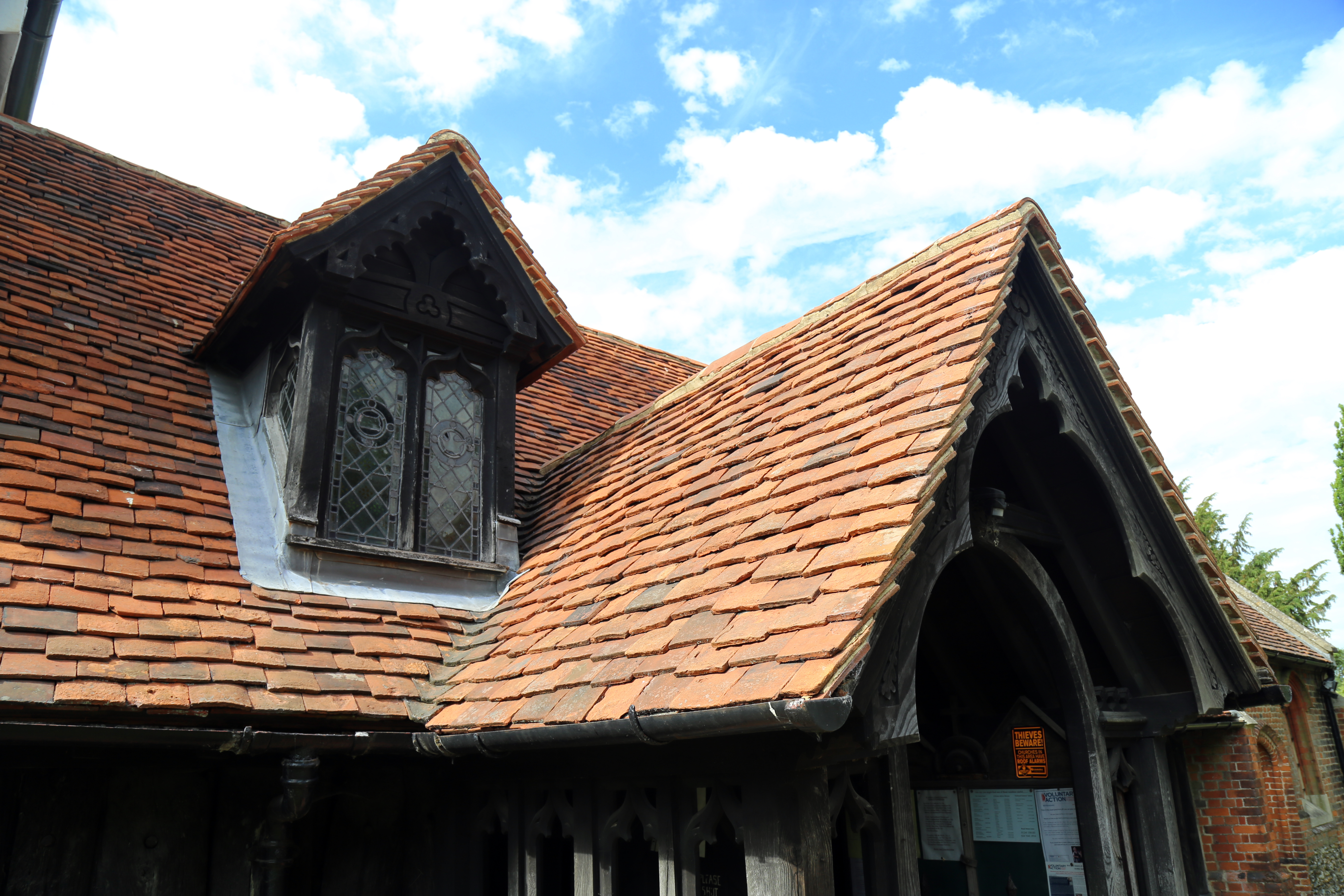
Flat tiles on the Church of St Andrew in Greensted, Ongar, Essex, England

One of the simplest designs of roof tile, these are simple overlapping slabs installed in the same manner as traditional shingles, usually held in place by nails or screws at their top. All forms of slate tile fall into this category. When installed, most of an individual shingle's surface area will be covered by the tiles overlapping it, with a minimum of two tiles overlapping at any one point. As a result, shingles require more tiles to cover a certain area than other patterns of similar size.

These tiles commonly feature a squared base, as is the case with English clay tiles, but in some cases can have a pointed or rounded end, as seen with the beaver-tail tile common in Southern Germany.

=== Imbrex and tegula ===
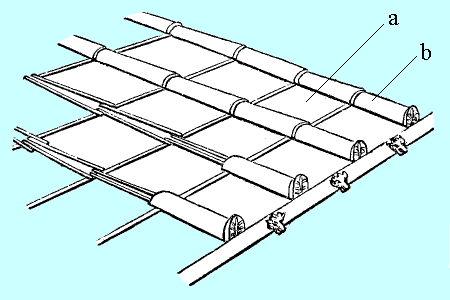
Edges of each tegula (a) are covered by curved imbrex (b)

The imbrex and tegula are overlapping tiles that were used by many ancient cultures, including the Chinese, Greeks, and Romans. The tegula is a flat tile laid against the surface of the roof, while the imbrex is a semi-cylindrical tile laid over the joints between tegulae.

In early designs tegula were perfectly flat, however over time they were designed to have ridges along their edges to channel water away from the gaps between tiles.

=== Mission / Monk and Nun tiles ===
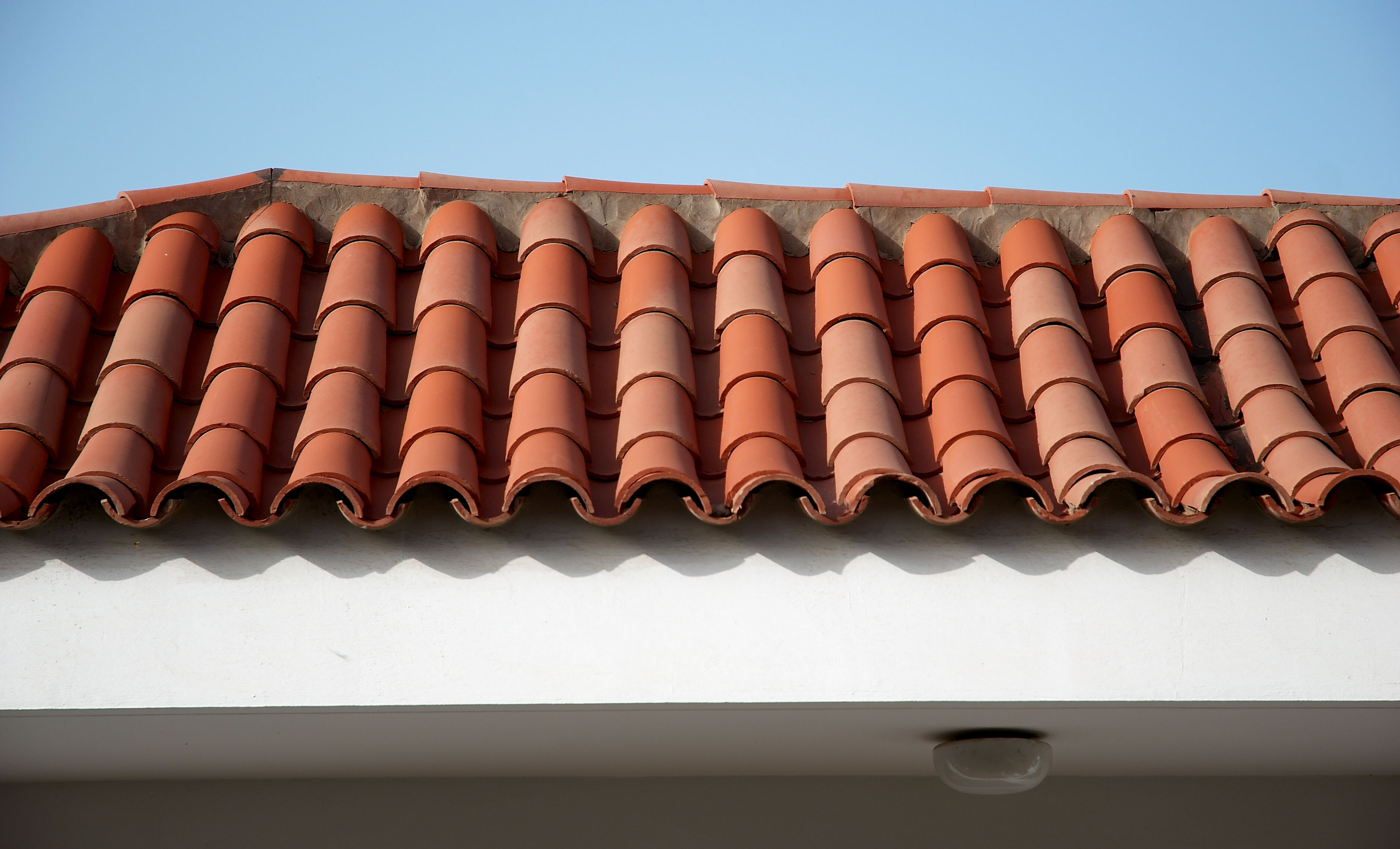
Mission tile in Spain

Similar to the imbrex and tegula design of tile, mission tiles are a semi-cylindrical two-piece tile system, composed of a pan and cover. Unlike the imbrex and tegula both the pan and cover of Mission tile are arched.

Early examples of this profile were created by bending a piece of clay over a worker's thigh, which resulted in the semi-circular curve. This could add a taper to one end of the tile.

=== Pantiles / S tiles ===
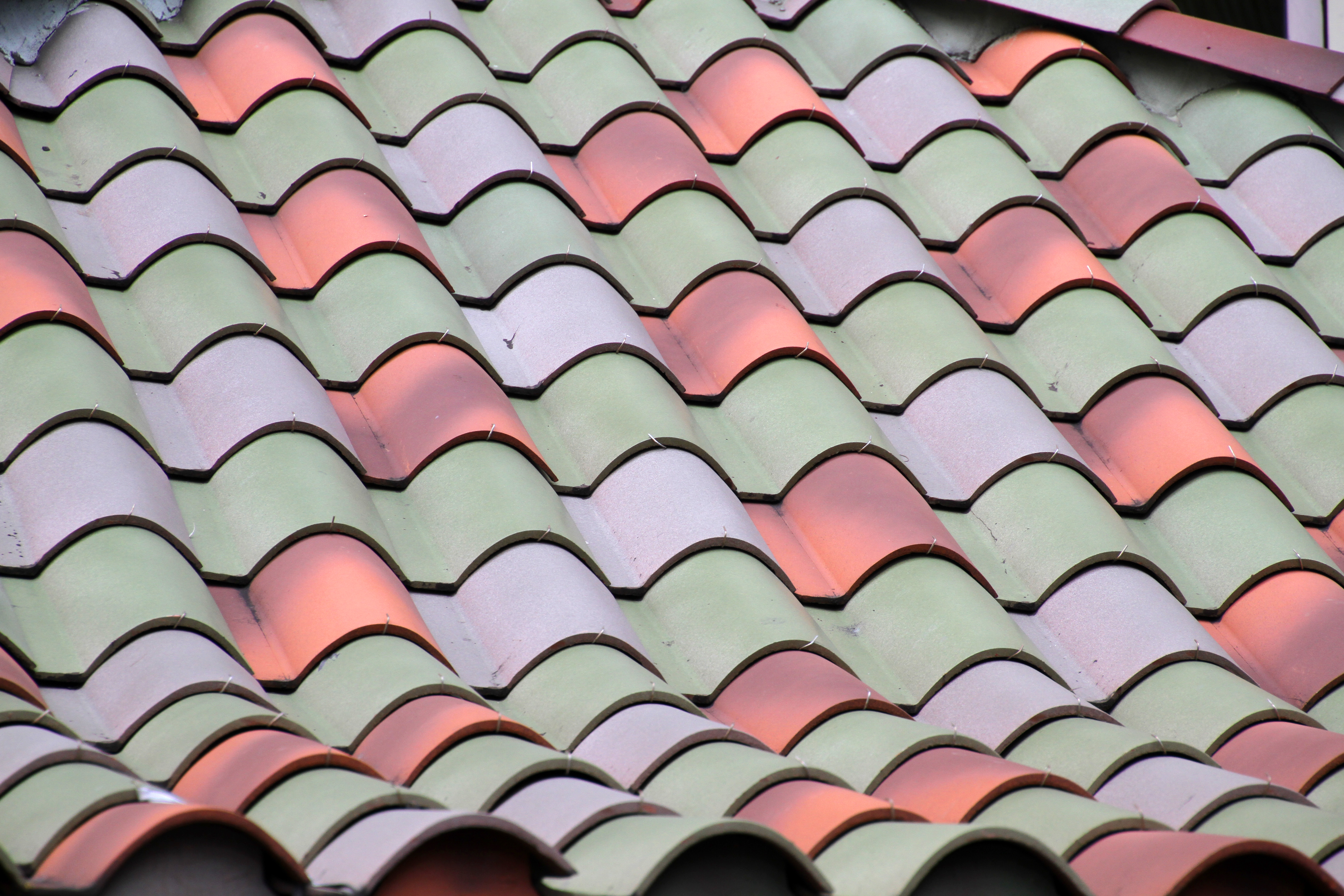
Pantiles in a "Spanish" pattern

Pantiles are similar to mission tiles except that they consolidate the pan and cover into a single piece. This allows for greater surface area coverage with fewer tiles, and fewer cracks that could lead to leakage.

These tiles are traditionally formed through an extruder. In addition to the S-shaped Spanish tiles, this category includes the Scandia tiles common to Scandinavia and Northern Europe.

=== Interlocking tiles ===
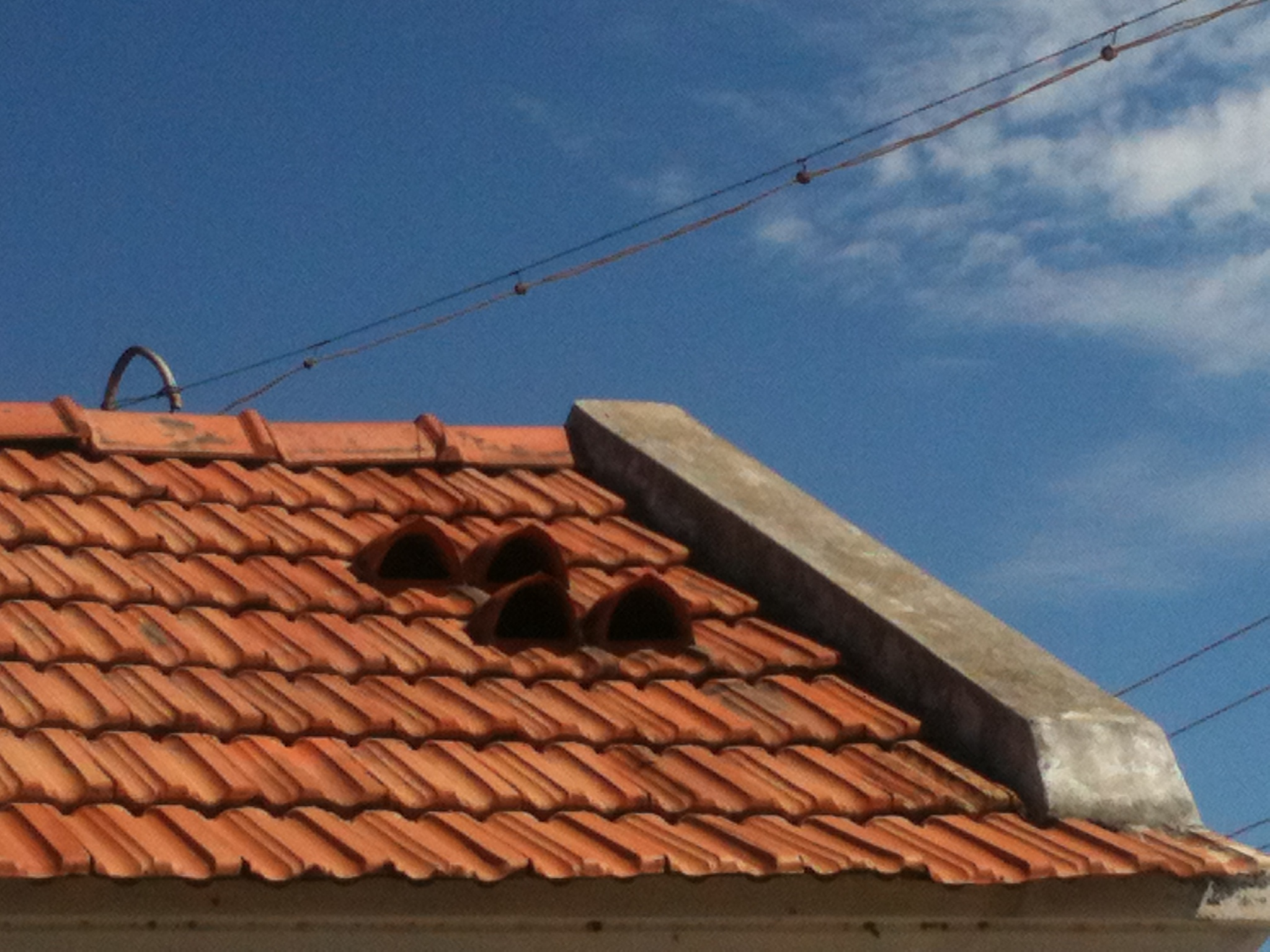
Interlocking Mangalore tiles in the Ludowici pattern, Tamil Nadu, India

Dating to the 1840s, interlocking tiles are the newest category of roofing tile and one of the widest ranging in appearance. Their distinguishing feature is the presence of a ridge for interlocking with one another. This allows them to provide a high ratio of roof area to number of tiles used. Many distinct profiles fall into this category, such as the Marseilles, Ludowici, and Conosera patterns.

Unlike other types of tiles, which can often be produced through hand-forming methods, interlocking tiles can only be manufactured with a tile press.

In many cases interlocking tile is designed to imitate other patterns of tile, such as flat shingles or pantiles, which can make it difficult to identify from the ground without inspecting an individual tile for a ridge.

== History as a vernacular material ==
The exact origins of clay roofing tiles are obscure, but it is believed that it was developed independently during the late Neolithic period in both ancient Greece and China, before spreading in use across Europe and Asia.

=== Europe ===
==== Greece ====
It is believed that clay roof tiles were first used in Ancient Greece between 2000-3000 BCE. Fired roof-tiles have been found in the House of the tiles in Lerna, Greece. Debris found at the site contained thousands of terracotta tiles which had fallen from the roof. In the Mycenaean period, roof tiles are documented for Gla and Midea.

The earliest roof tiles from the Archaic period in Greece are documented from a very restricted area around Corinth, where fired tiles began to replace thatched roofs at two temples of Apollo and Poseidon between 700 and 650 BC. Spreading rapidly, roof tiles were found within fifty years at many sites around the Eastern Mediterranean, including Mainland Greece, Western Asia Minor, and Southern and Central Italy. Early Greek roof-tiles were of the imbrex and tegula style. While more expensive and labour-intensive to produce than thatch, their introduction has been explained by their greatly enhanced fire-resistance which gave desired protection to the costly temples.

The spread of the roof-tile technique has to be viewed in connection with the simultaneous rise of monumental architecture in Ancient Greece. Only the newly appearing stone walls, which were replacing the earlier mudbrick and wood walls, were strong enough to support the weight of a tiled roof. As a side-effect, it has been assumed that the new stone and tile construction also ushered in the end of 'Chinese roof' (Knickdach) construction in Greek architecture, as they made the need for an extended roof as rain protection for the mudbrick walls obsolete.

A Greek roof tile was responsible for the death of Molossian Greek king Pyrrhus of Epirus in 272 BC after a woman threw one at the king's head as he was attacking her son.

==== Roman Empire ====
Roof tiles similar to Greek designs continued to be used through the reign of the Roman Empire. They were a common feature in Roman cities, despite the fact that a single tile would often cost the equivalent of 1.5 day's wages. Tiles were commonly used as improvised weapons during citizen uprisings, as they were one of few such weapons available to city-dwellers of the time.

Roman imbrex and tebula roofs generally avoided the use of nails and were instead held in place through gravity, it is possible that this was one of the reasons their tile was found on low pitched roofs.

The Romans spread the use and production of roofing tile across their colonies in Europe, with kilns and tile-works constructed as far west and north as Spain and Britain. Early records suggest that brick and tile-works were considered under the control of the Roman state for a period of time.

==== Northern Europe ====
It is believed that the Romans introduced the use of clay roof tile to Britain after their conquest in AD 43. The earliest known sites for the production of roof tile are near the Fishbourne Roman Palace. Early tiles produced in Britain followed the Roman imbrex and tebula style, but also included flat shingle tiles, which could be produced with less experience.

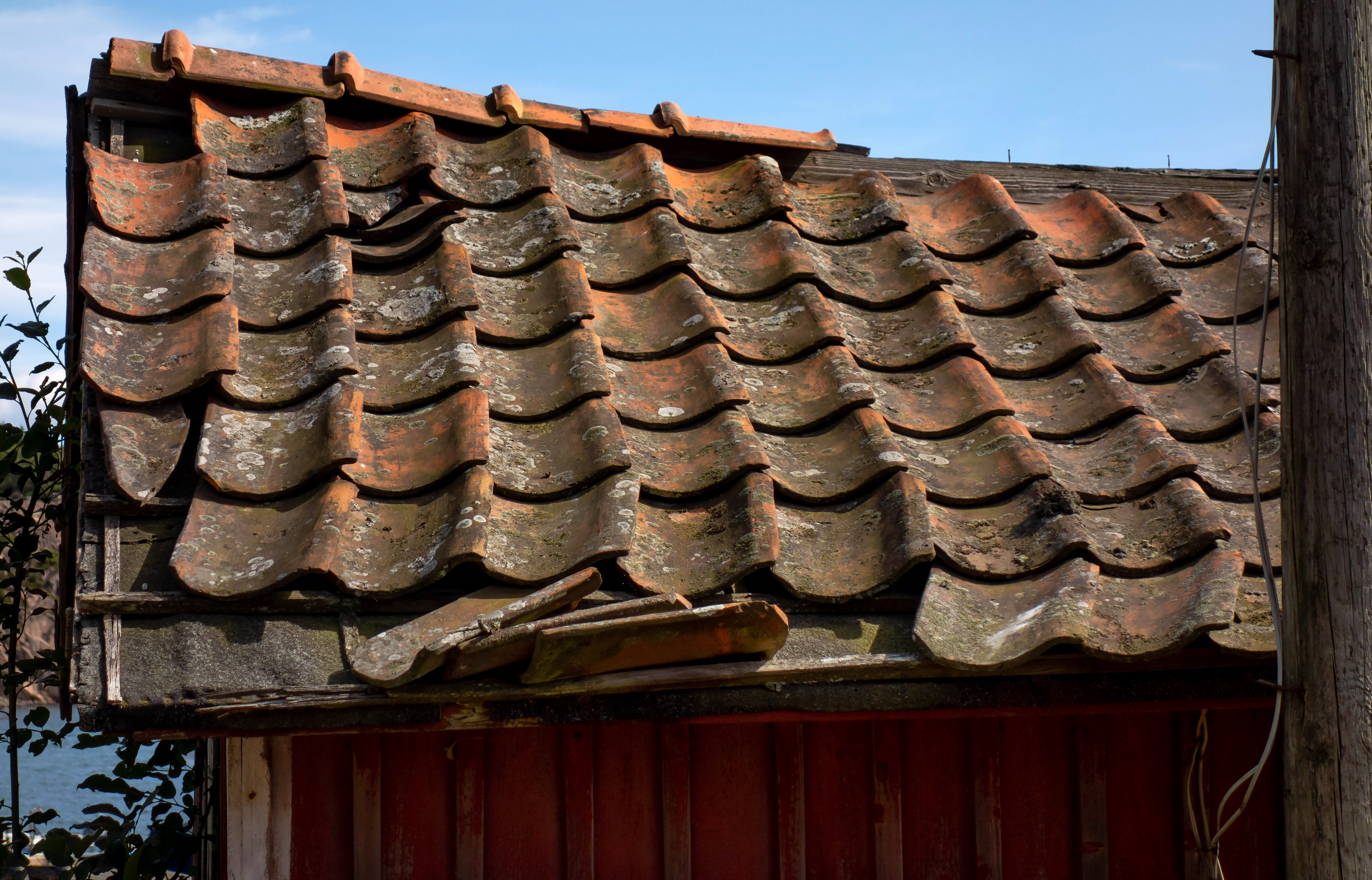
Tiles typical of Scandinavian style in Lahälla, Lysekil Municipality, Sweden

For a while after the dissolution of the Roman Empire, the manufacture of tile for roofs and decoration diminished in Northern Europe. In the twelfth century clay, slate, and stone roofing tile began to see more use, initially on abbeys and royal palaces. Their use was later encouraged within Medieval towns as a means of preventing the spread of fire. Simple flat shingle tiles became common during this period due to their ease of manufacture.

Scandinavian roof tiles have been seen on structures dating to the 1500s when city rulers in Holland required the use of fireproof materials. At the time, most houses were made of wood and had thatch roofing, which would often cause fires to spread quickly. To satisfy demand, many small roof-tile makers began to produce roof tiles by hand. The Scandinavian style of roof tile is a variation on the pantile which features a subdued "S" shape reminiscent of an ocean wave.

In Britain, tiles were also used to provide weather protection to the sides of timber frame buildings, a practice known as tile hanging. Another form of this is the so-called mathematical tile, which was hung on laths, nailed and then grouted. This form of tiling gives an imitation of brickwork and was developed to give the appearance of brick, but avoided the brick taxes of the 18th century.

=== Asia ===
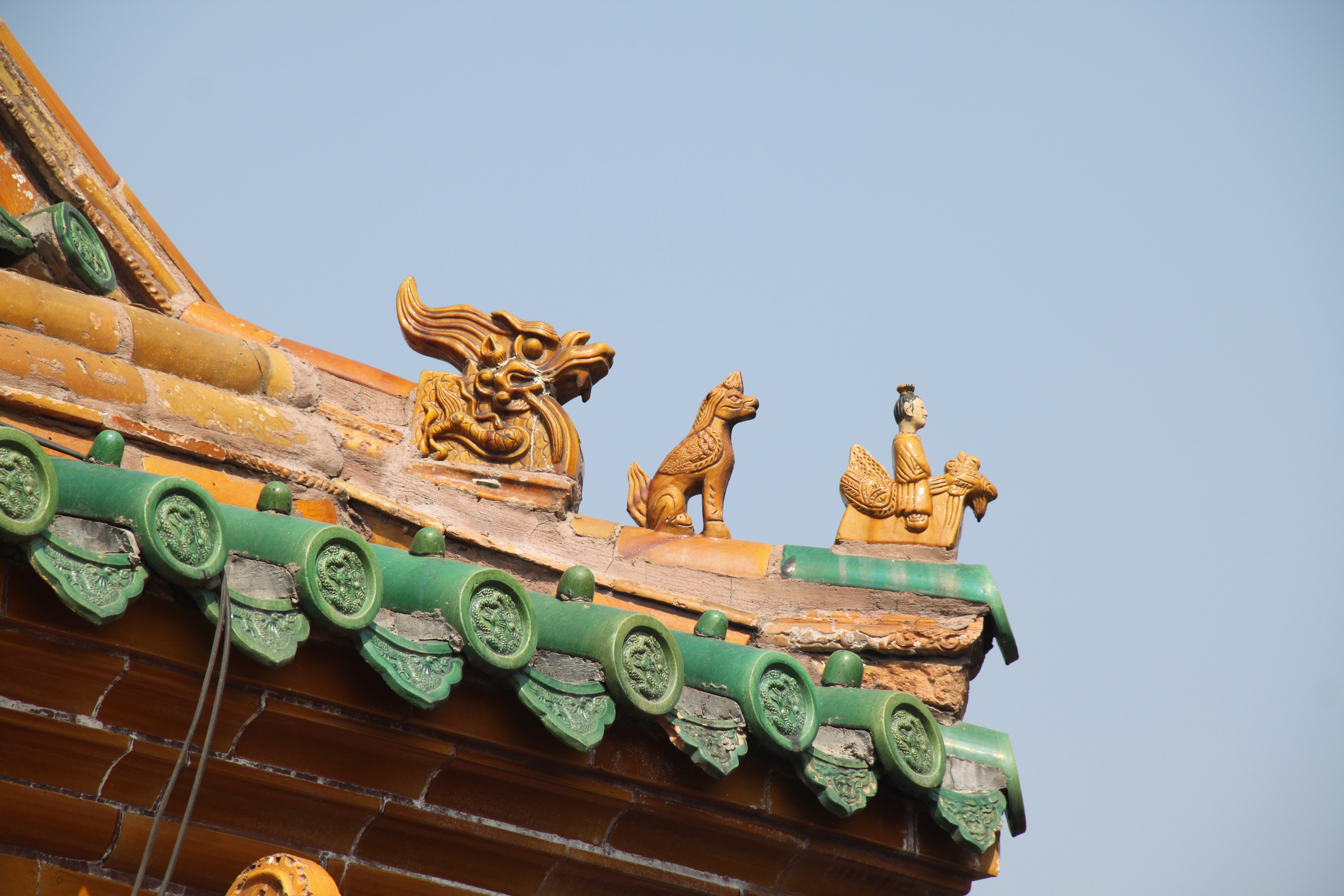
Glazed tile and figures on a roof in Shenyang, Liaoning Province, China

==== China ====
Clay roof tiles are the main form of historic ceramic tilework in China, due largely to the emphasis that traditional Chinese architecture places on a roof as opposed to a wall. Roof tile fragments have been found in the Loess Plateau dating to the Longshan period, showing some of the earliest pan and cover designs found in Asia. During the Song dynasty, the manufacture of glazed tiles was standardized in Li Jie's Yingzao Fashi. In the Ming dynasty and Qing dynasty, glazed tiles became ever more popular for top-tier buildings, including palace halls in the Forbidden City and ceremonial temples such as the Heavenly Temple.

Chinese architecture is notable for its advancement of colored gloss glazes for roof tiles. Marco Polo made note of these on his travels to China, writing:

The roof is all ablaze with scarlet and green and blue and yellow and all the colors that are, so brilliantly varnished that it glitters like crystal and the color of it can be seen from far away.

==== Japan ====
Japanese architecture includes Onigawara as roof ornamentation in conjunction with tiled roofs. They are generally roof tiles or statues depicting a Japanese ogre (oni) or a fearsome beast. Prior to the Heian period, similar ornaments with floral and plant designs "hanagawara" preceded the onigawara.

Onigawara are most often found in Buddhist temples. In some cases the ogre's face may be missing.

==== Korea ====
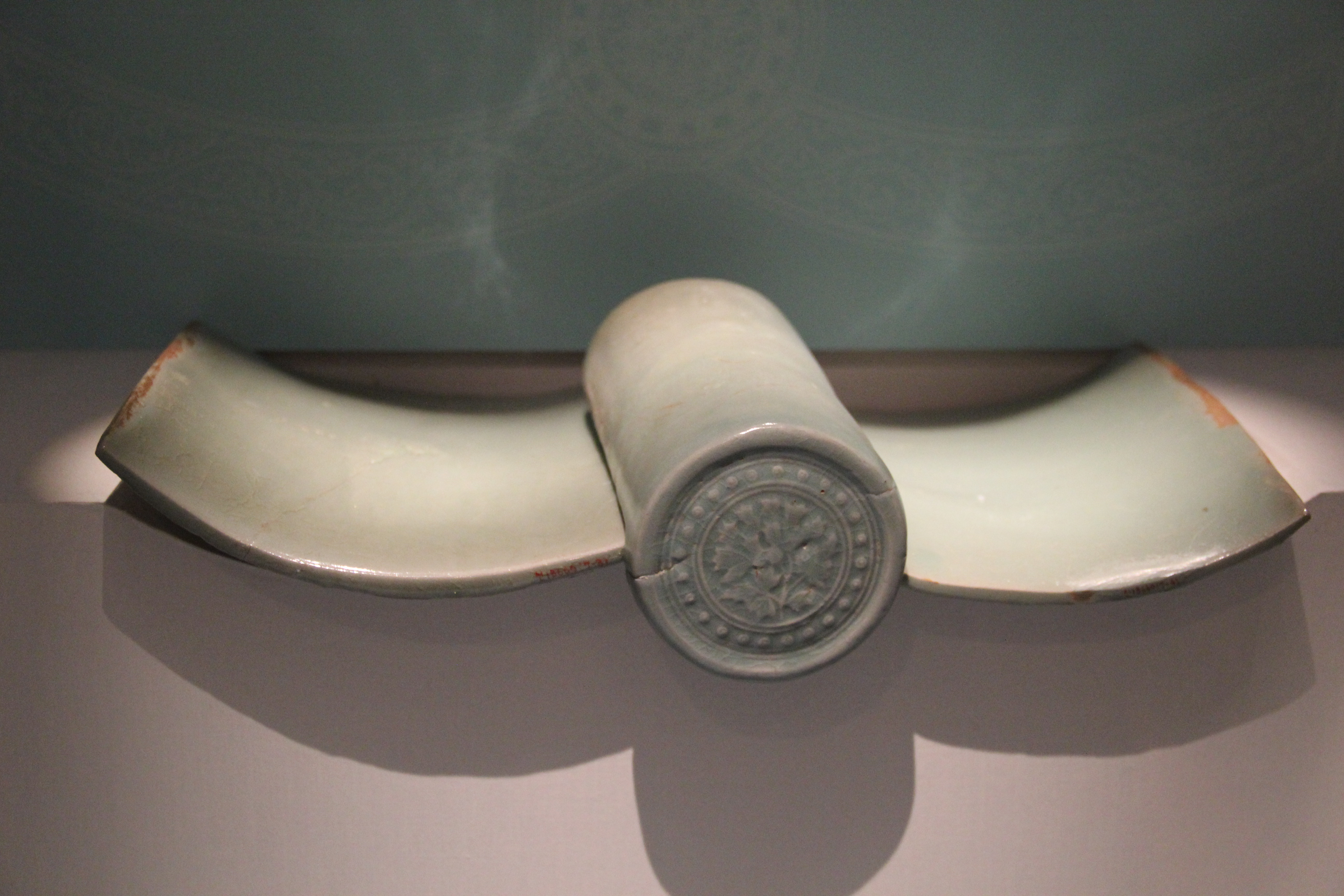
Celadon glazed roof tile from the Goryeo dynasty

In Korea the use of tile, known as giwa, dates back to the Three Kingdoms period, but it was not until the Unified Silla period that tile roofing became widely used. Tiles were initially reserved for temples and royal buildings as a status symbol.

The designs used on giwa can have symbolic meanings, with different figures representing concepts such as spirituality, longevity, happiness, and enlightenment. The five elements of fire, water, wood, metal and earth were common decorations during the Three Kingdoms period, and during the Goryeo dynasty Celadon glaze was invented and used for the roof tiles of the upper class.

Many post-war Korean roofs feature giwa and a common ornamental symbol is the Mugunghwa, South Korea's national flower.

==== India ====
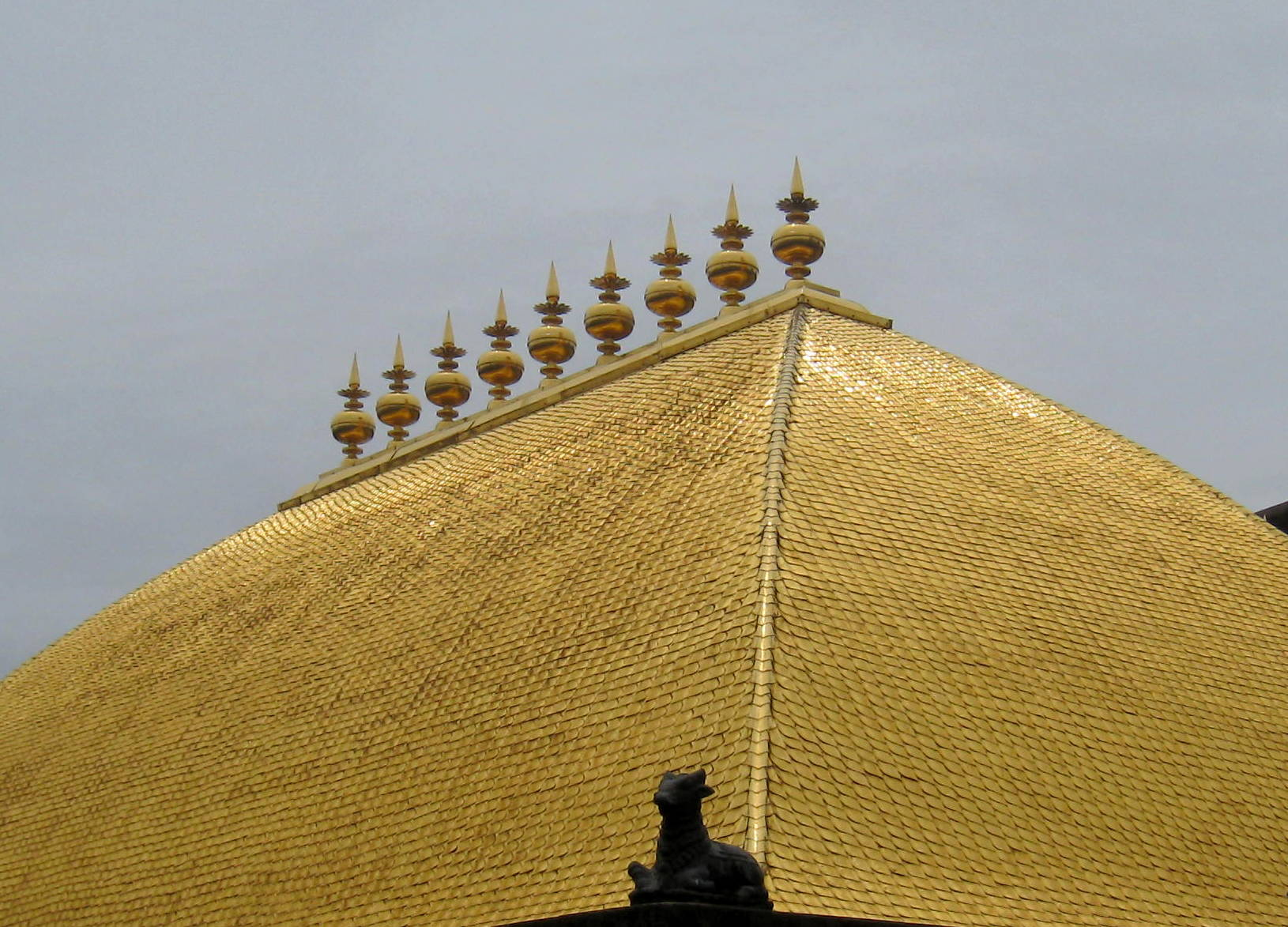
Golden roof tiles on inner-shrine of Nataraja temple, 10th century, India

Neolithic sites such as Alamgirpur in Uttar Pradesh provide early evidence of roof tiles. They became more common during the iron age and the early historic period during the first millennium BCE. These early roof tiles were flat tiles and rounded or bent tiles, a form that was widespread across the Ganga Valley and the Indian Peninsula, suggesting that it was an essential architectural element of this period. This early form of roof tiles also influenced roof tiles of neighboring Nepal and Sri lanka.

Metal roof tiles made of gold, silver, bronze and copper are restricted to religious architecture in South Asia. A notable temple with golden roof tiles is the Nataraja temple of Chidambaram, where the roof of the main shrine in the inner courtyard has been laid with 21,600 golden tiles.

==== Southeast Asia ====
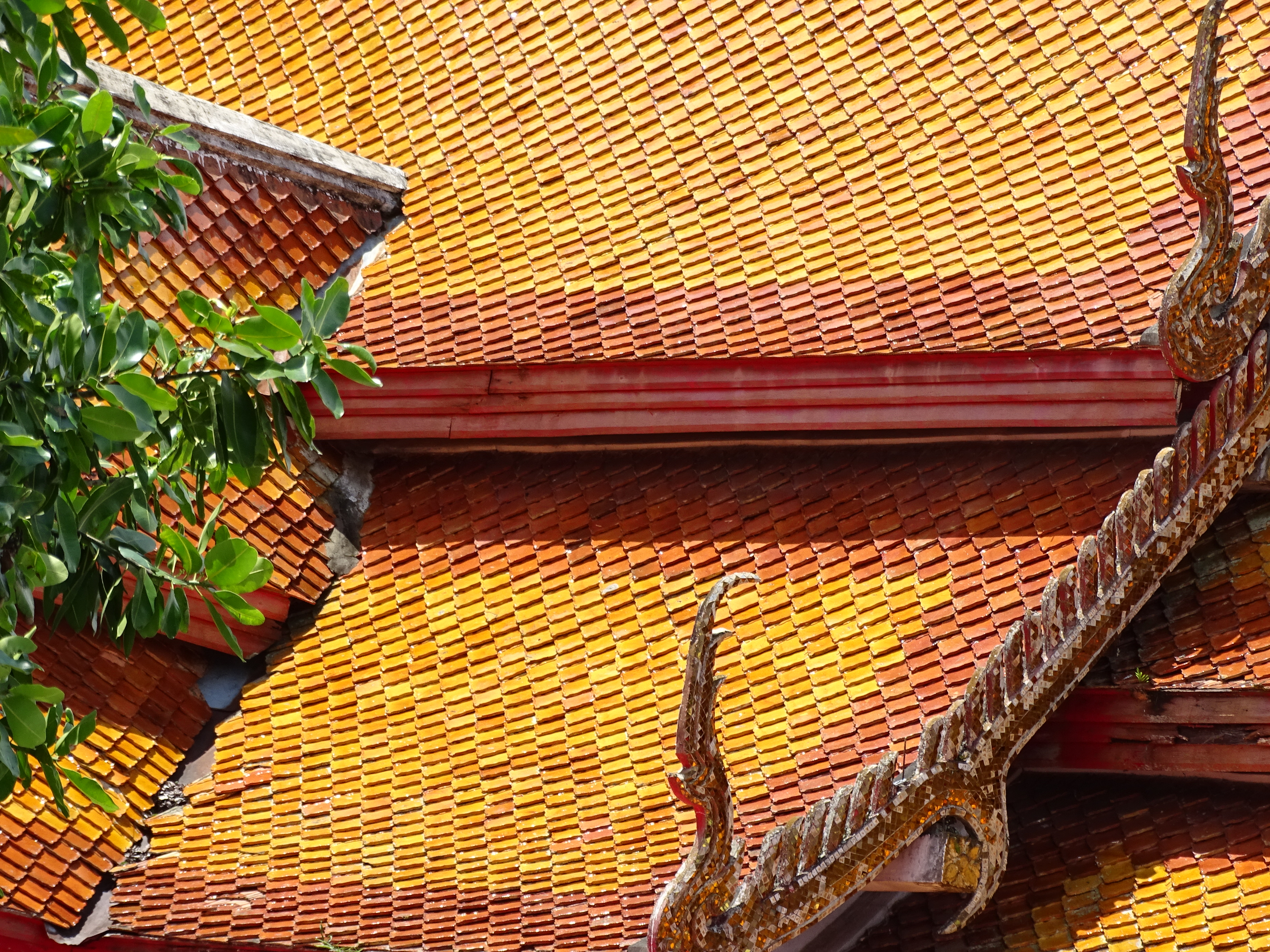
Red and yellow glazed clay shingle tiles on Wat Phra That Doi Suthep, Chiang Mai, Thailand

Tapered flat roof tiles have been used in Thailand, Laos and Cambodia since at least the 9th or 10th century CE, with widespread adoption after the 14th century, commonly to roof traditional Buddhist temple architecture. These shingle tiles have flat elongated bodies with a bent upper end for hooking at the roof and a pointed lower end.

In Indonesia, approximately 90% of houses in Java island use clay roof tile. Traditionally, Javanese architecture use clay roof tiles mounted on an open batten system to allow for ventilation of hot air. It was not until the late 19th century that houses of commoners in Java and Bali started using roof tiles. The Dutch colonial administration encouraged the usage of roof tiles to increase hygiene. Before the mass usage of roof tiles in Java and Bali, commoners of both of islands used thatched or nipa roof like the inhabitants of other Indonesian islands.

In the Philippines, aside from various thatching methods, a native roof tiling technique is the kalaka which uses halved bamboo sections fitted together. During the Spanish colonial era of the Philippines, colonial-era bahay na bato architecture (which mixes native and Spanish architecture) also extensively used the Spanish-style Monk and Nun tiles, known natively as teja de curva.

=== North America ===
Roof tiles were introduced to North America by colonizers from Europe, and typically were traditional designs native to their original country.

Pieces of clay roof tile have been found in archeological excavations of the English settlement at Roanoke Colony dating to 1585, and in later English settlements in Jamestown, Virginia and St. Mary's, Maryland. Spanish and French colonists brought their designs and styles of roofing tile to areas they settled along what are now the southern United States and Mexico, with Spanish-influenced tile fragments found in Saint Augustine, Florida, and both Spanish and French styles used in New Orleans, Louisiana.

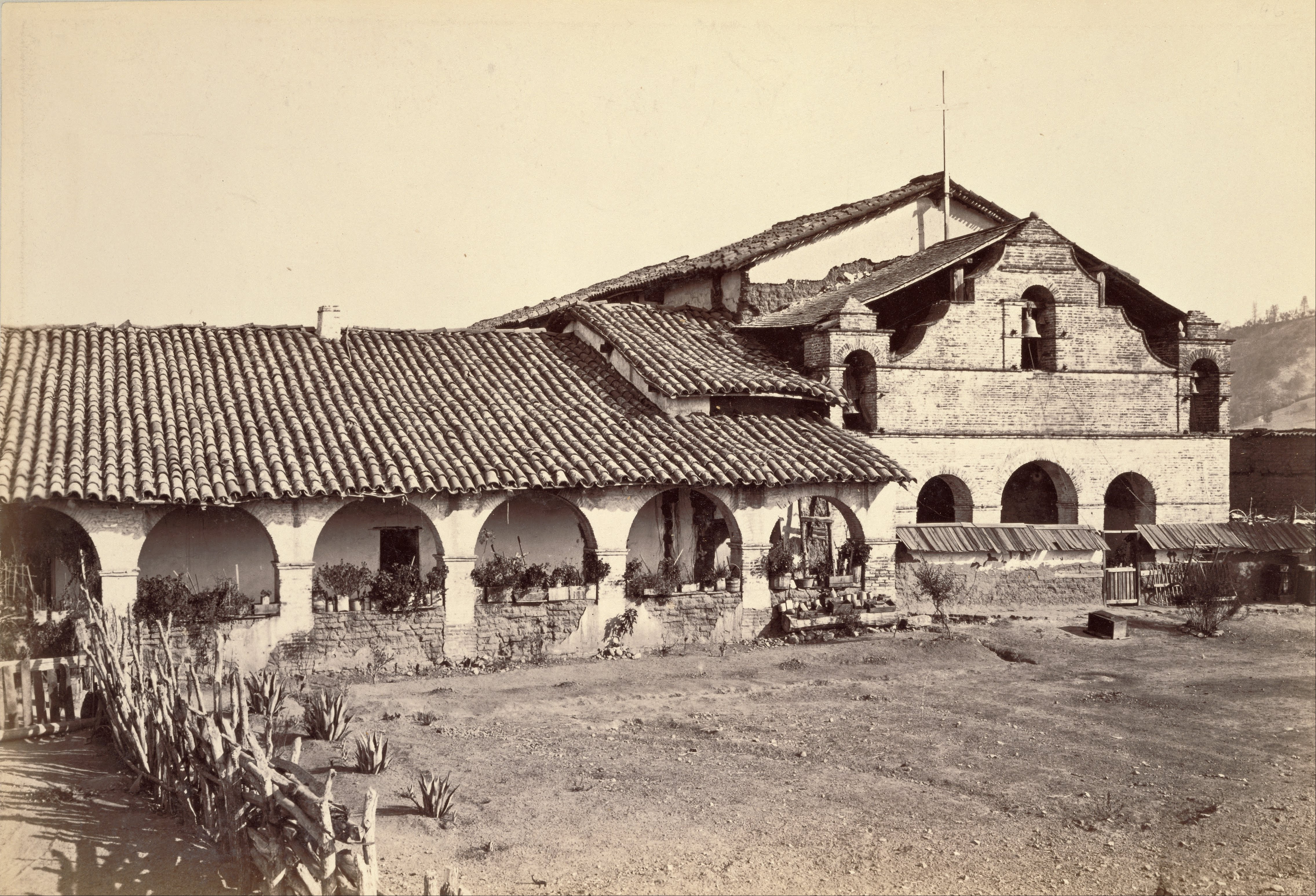
Mission San Antonio de Padua, California, with mission style roof around 1880

From the 1600s through early 1800s, clay roofing tile was a popular material in colonial American cities due to its fire-resistance, especially after the establishment of urban fire-codes. Dutch settlers first imported tile to their settlements in what are now the Northeastern United States, and had established full-scale production of roofing tiles in the upper Hudson River Valley by 1650 to supply New Amsterdam.

Clay roof tiles were first produced on the West Coast at the Mission San Antonio de Padua in 1780. This Spanish-influenced style of tile remains in common use in California. A notable site of roof tile production was Zoar, Ohio, where a religious sect of German Zoarites formed a commune in 1817 and produced their own roofs in a handmade German beaver-tail style for several decades.

Over time, clay roof tiles faced increased competition from other fire-resistant roofing materials such as slate and metals such as copper, iron, zinc, and galvanized iron. Roof tiles saw a decline in use throughout North America during the early to mid 1800s.

== Post-vernacular history ==
=== Clay tiles ===
Beginning in the mid-1800s, expanding industrial production allowed for more efficient and large-scale production of clay roofing tile. At the same time, increasing city growth led to rising demand for stronger fireproof materials to limit the danger of urban fires, such as the Great Chicago Fire of 1871.

Additionally, the newly-popular Italianate style of architecture created renewed stylistic desire for clay roof tiles in Britain and North America. Other revival styles such as Romanesque, Mission, Spanish Baroque, Georgian, and Mediterranean all called for unique styles of clay roof tiles, creating further demand for their production and improvement in Europe and North America. Some have argued that changes in architectural taste, rather than functionality or durability, dictated the extent of clay roof tile's usage in North America.

These conditions combined to bring a significant expansion in the use and production of roof tile, with a shift from regional and hand-produced tile to patented and machine-made tile sold by large manufacturers.

==== Gilardoni tiles ====
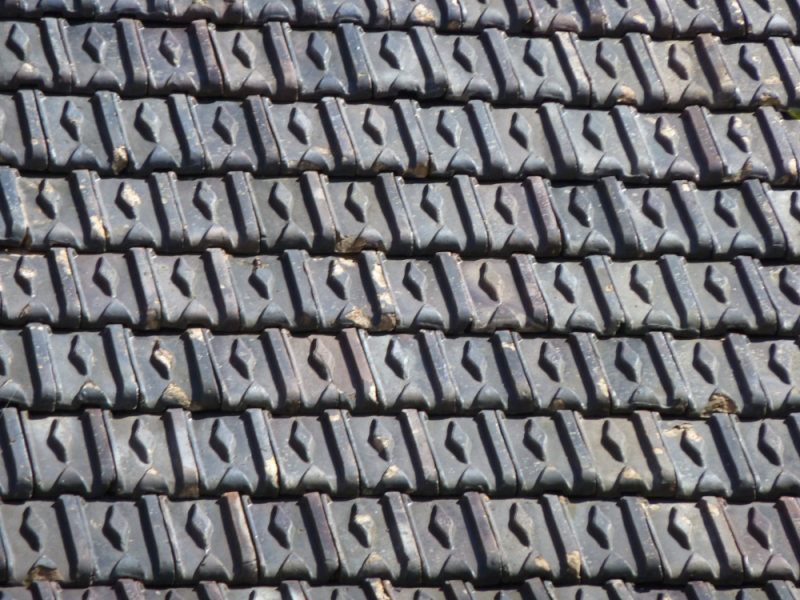
The Gilardoni Brothers' first interlocking roof tile pattern, sometimes referred to as a Heart tile

The Gilardoni brothers of Altkirch, France, were the first to develop a functional interlocking roof tile.

The Gilardonis' design marked a significant shift in the design of roofing tile. Prior to this tile most roofing tile profiles could be hand made without the need for large-scale machines, but the new interlocking tiles could only be produced with a tile press and were more cost effective than comparable vernacular styles. Through the rest of the 19th century many companies began refining and developing other versions of interlocking tiles.

The Gilardoni brothers began making their design in 1835 and took out a patent on their first design of interlocking clay tile in 1841, with a subsequent design patented ten years later. The Gilardonis licensed their patent to six other French tile manufacturers between 1845 and 1860, contributing greatly to the spread of interlocking tile usage throughout France and Europe. Their company built additional factories and continued to operate until 1974.

==== Marseilles tiles ====
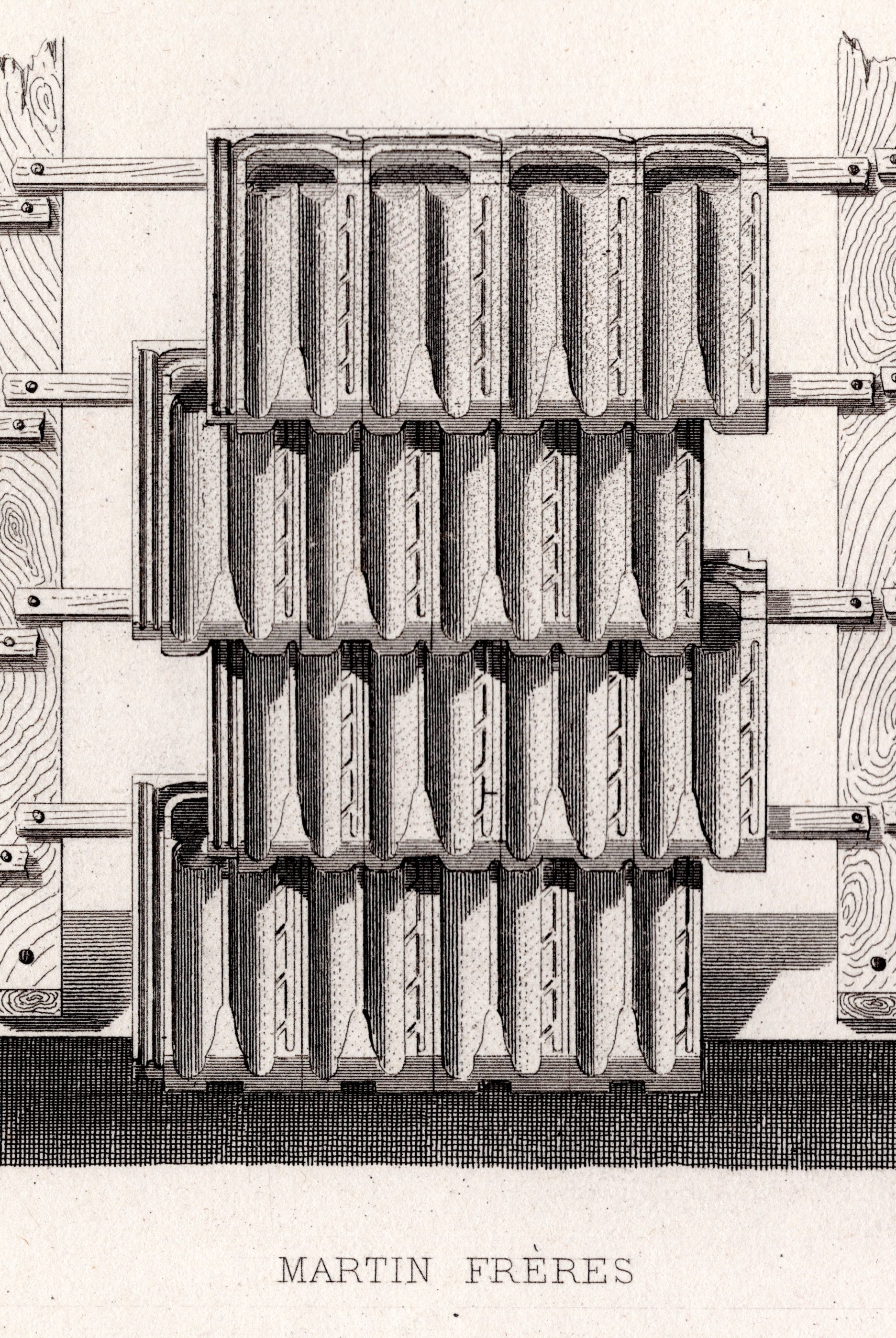
An 1861 illustration of Marseilles tile

Another popular early interlocking tile pattern was the Marseilles design invented by the Martin Brothers in Marseille, France, as early as the 1860s. The Marseilles tile pattern is distinguished from other designs by its diagonal notches on its side rebate, as well as the teardrop-shaped end of its middle-rib.

While the Martin Brothers invented the design, its widespread use was more due to the pattern's adoption and international production after its original patent expired. The Marseilles tile was widely exported, especially in European colonies in South and Central America, Africa, and Australia.

French-manufactured Marseilles tiles were imported to Australia by 1886 and New Zealand by 1899. Many New Zealand railway stations were built with them, including Dunedin. Large scale production of Marseilles tiles by Wunderlich began in Australia during war-time import shortages in 1916. From 1920, factories at Pargny-sur-Saulx exported tiles to England. By 1929 Winstone were making them at Taumarunui, in a tile works established about 1910, which was replaced by Plimmerton in 1954.

==== Ludowici tiles ====
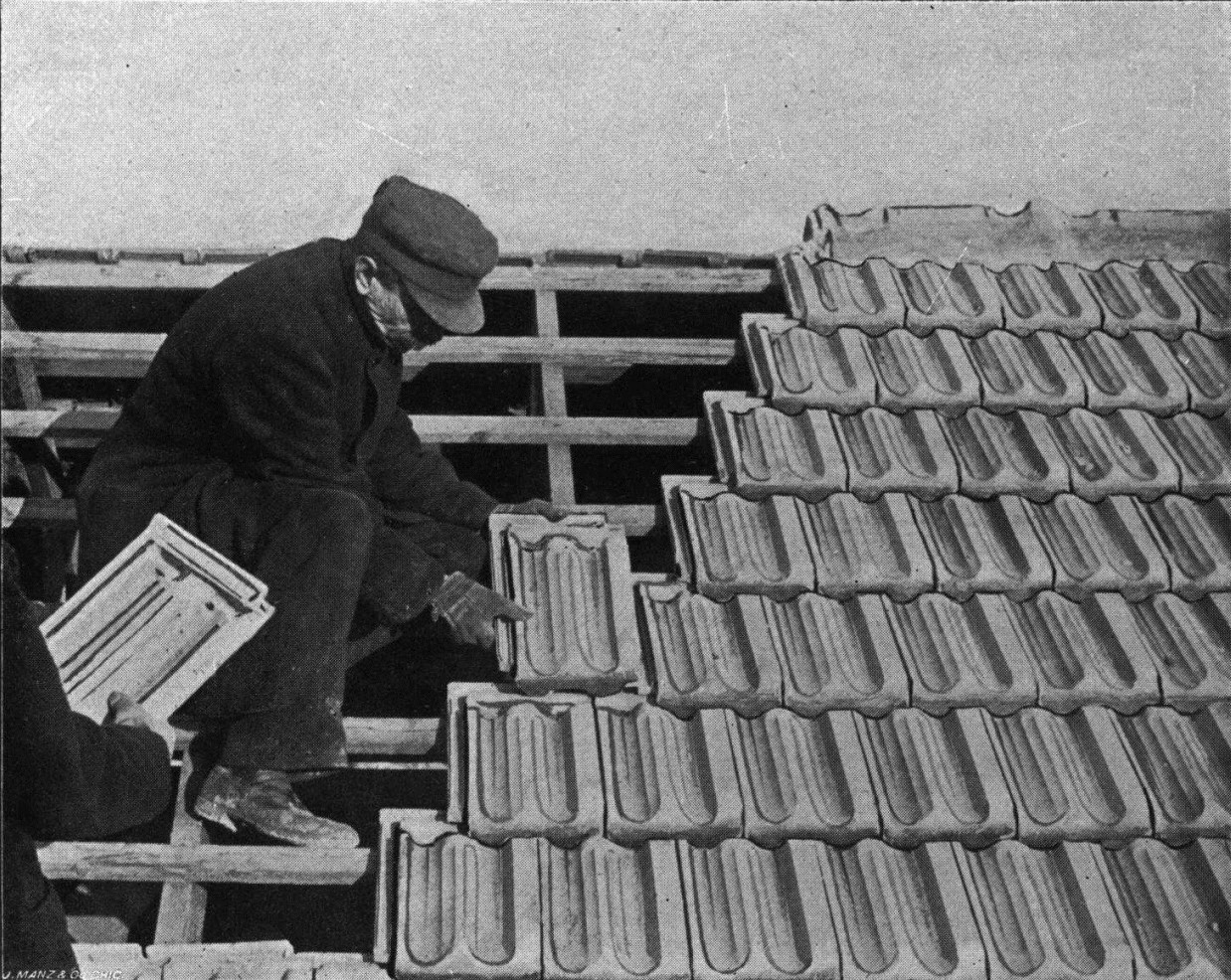
A roofer installing Ludowici pattern tile, also known as French, on open battens

In 1881 Wilhelm Ludowici developed an interlocking tile to improve upon the earlier designs. His design incorporated a double-rebate on the side, double head-fold at the top of the tile, and a strategically designed surface pattern for repelling water and melting snow from the top of the roof. Unlike other designs, Ludowici included the tile's central rib for functional reasons rather than aesthetic.

Ludowici's design was mass produced in Germany and later the United States by the Ludowici Roof Tile company, who advertised the pattern as French tile.

Many tiles found in the Mangalore region of India are derived from or made in this pattern. Clay roof tiles had been produced in the region since missionary Georg Plebst set up the first factory at Mangalore, Karnataka, India, in 1860 after finding large deposits of clay by the banks of the Gurupura and Netravati rivers. The initial tiles they produced were similar to the Gilardoni brothers' design, but later tiles adopted Ludowici's pattern. Over the years ten companies produced Mangalore tiles, which were exported around the Indian Ocean and subcontinent.

==== Conosera tiles ====
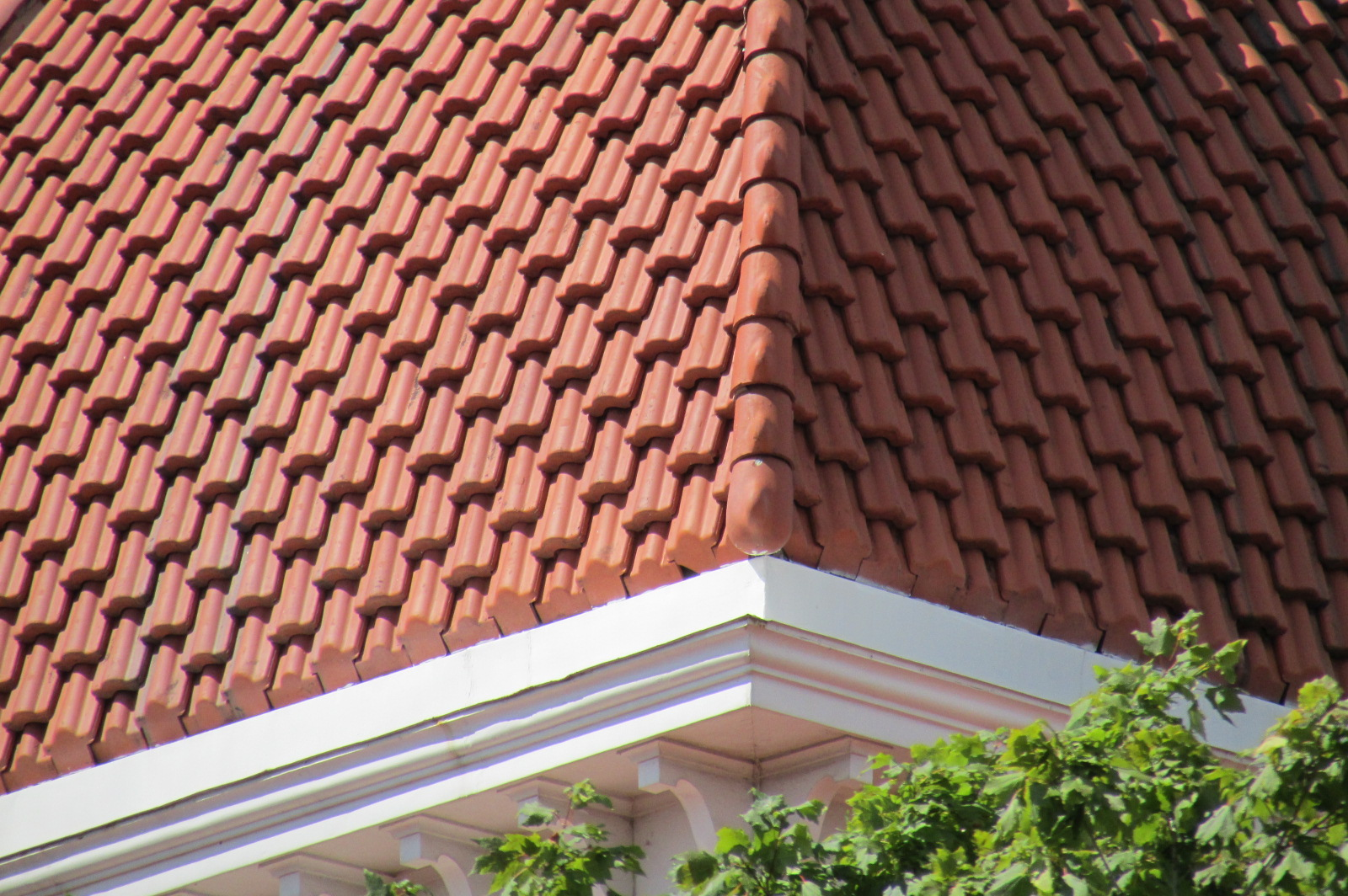
Conosera tile on the Lake County Courthouse, Crown Point, Indiana

The Conosera tile was developed by George Herman Babcock in 1889, and was unique due to its diagonally interlocking structure and design allowing for more installation flexibility than other interlocking tile designs. Babcock designed the pattern with towers and spires in mind, since his design significantly reduced the number of graduated tile sizes needed to roof a cone.

Conosera was initially manufactured and sold by the Celadon Terra Cotta Company of Alfred, New York. After a merger formed the Ludowici-Celadon Company in 1906 the group continued to produce Conosera tile for special orders.

=== Concrete tiles ===
The earliest known concrete tiles were developed in the 1840s by Adolph Kroher. While visiting Grassau, Bavaria, Kroher learned about locals' use of regional minerals to create stucco and began to experiment with the material, developing a diamond-shaped interlocking pattern of concrete tile which became one of his company's primary profiles. He also manufactured a concrete pantile similar to the Scandinavian style of clay tile.

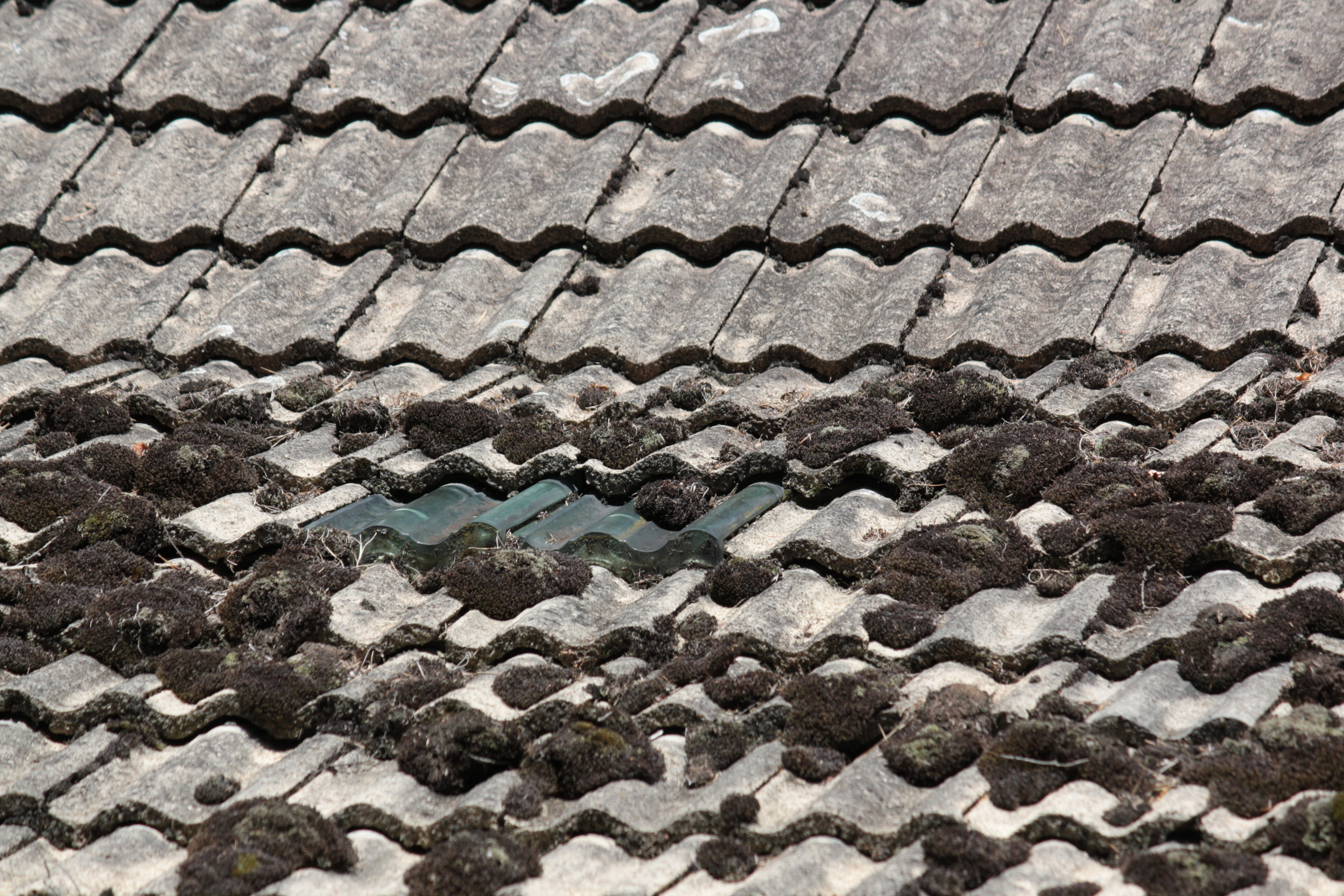
Modern concrete roof tiles

In order to reduce the high shipping cost for his tile, Kroher adopted a 'do-it-yourself' method of tile manufacture for some time, where he sold a supply of cement and the necessary tools for a home-builder to create their own tiles. This had the disadvantage that cement was prepared by amateurs and did not always have consistent or correct mixing preparation.

Concrete tiles became more widespread in Germany over the next few decades after manufacturers such as Jörgen Peter Jörgensen and Hartwig Hüser began producing interlocking and overlapping designs.

The concrete tile industry grew and spread internationally through the early 20th century, driven by its cheapness to produce at scale. Many considered concrete tile inferior to clay tile for long-term usage, largely due to its fundamental weaknesses of porosity and color impermanence.

=== Glass tiles ===
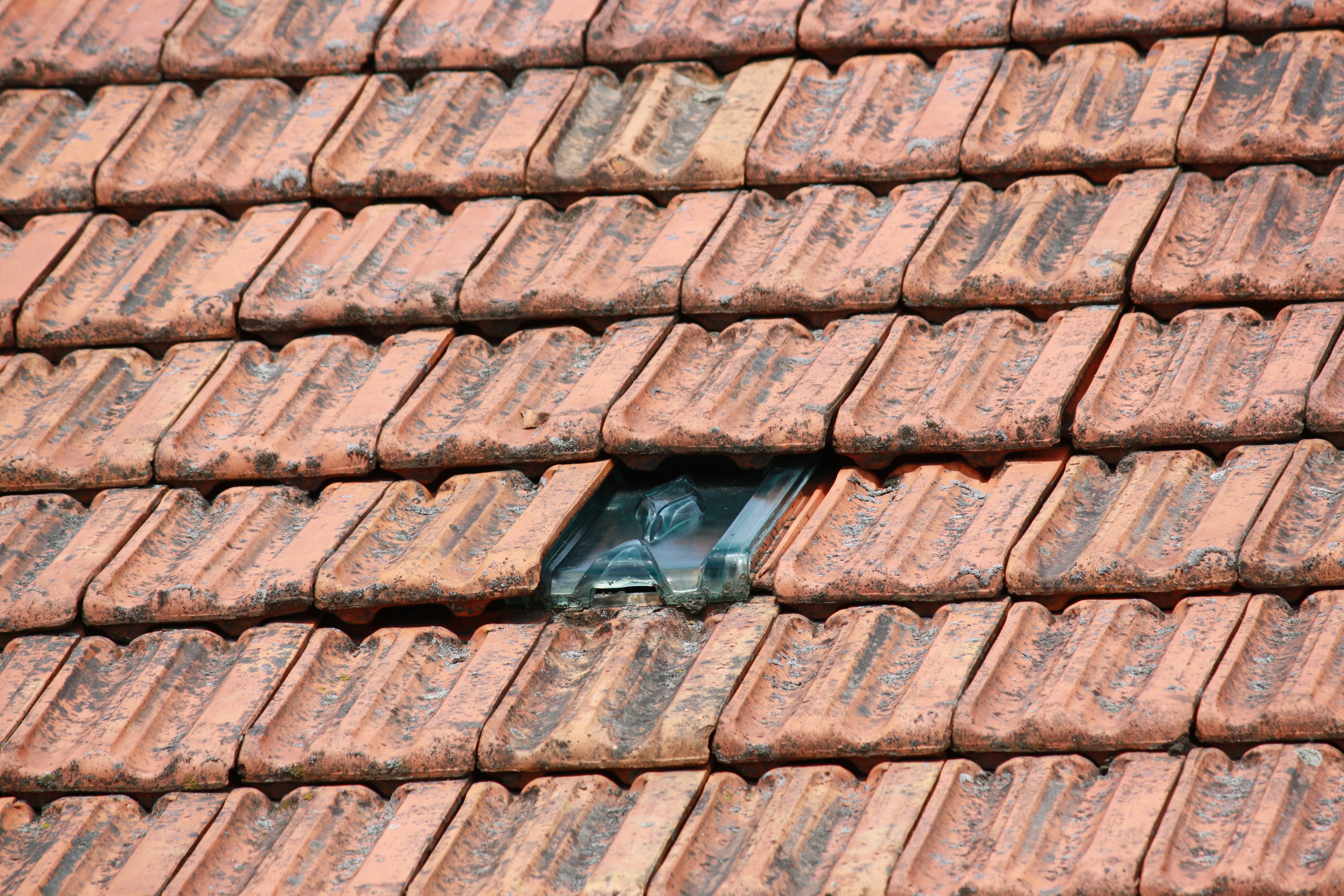
A glass tile among clay tiles

Glass tiles, also referred to as skylight tiles, are used as accessories alongside clay roof tiles. These were first developed in the 1890s and designed to allow light into spaces roofed with interlocking tiles, such as warehouses and factories.

It is uncommon for a roof to be completely covered in glass tiles however there are a few exceptions, such as on the tower of Seattle's King Street Station.

=== Plastic tiles ===
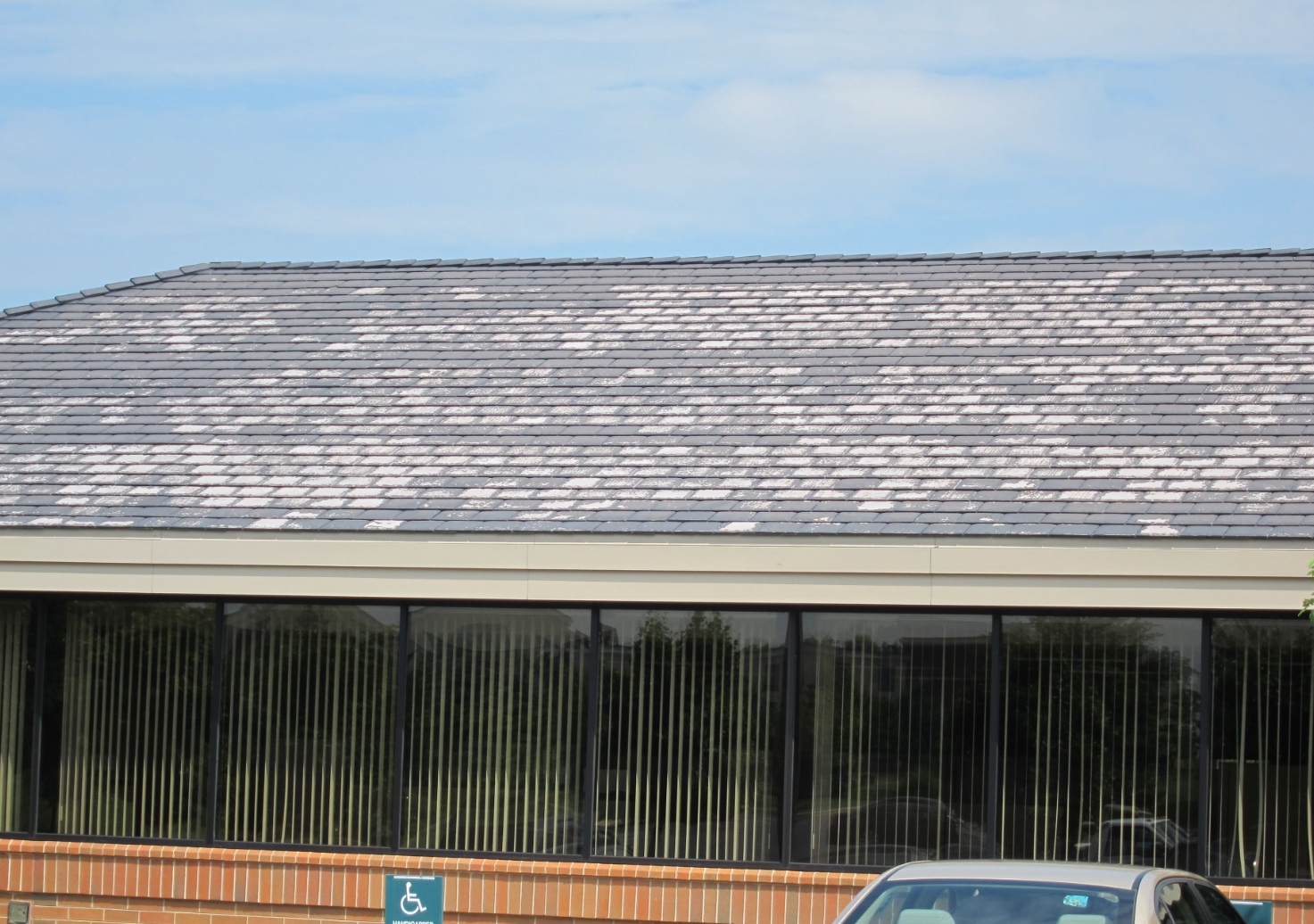
A synthetic or composite tile roof, showing fading and delamination from exposure to sun.

Plastic tiles, marketed as composite or synthetic tiles, became available towards the end of the 20th century. Their exact invention date is unclear, but most became available around the year 2000.

Plastic tiles are generally designed to imitate slate or clay tiles, and achieve their color through synthetic dyes added to the plastic. They are produced through injection molding.

=== Solar tiles ===
Dow Chemical Company began producing solar roof tiles in 2005, and several other manufacturers followed suit. They are similar in design to conventional roof tiles but with a photovoltaic cell within in order to generate renewable electricity.

In 2016 a collaboration between the companies SolarCity and Tesla produced a hydrographically printed tile which appears to be a regular tile from street level but is transparent to sunlight when viewed straight on. Tesla later acquired SolarCity and the solar shingle product was described as "a flop" in 2019. The company later dropped their claim that their tiles were three times as strong as standard tiles, without specifying why they backed away from the claim.

== Specialty tiles ==
Tile roof systems often incorporate specialty fittings and trim pieces to seal gaps along the ridge and edges of a roof.

Types of fitting and trim tiles
Fitting name	Image	Description
Ridge tiles	Ridge tiles and dove on roof in Heidelberg, Germany	Ridge pieces are laid upon the very top ridge of a roof, where the planes of a pitched roof meet. This section is usually parallel to the ground beneath. The tiles which cover this section of the roof have to direct water away from the top of the ridge and onto either side of the pitched roof below.
Hip tiles	A series of hip tiles seen on a roof in Texas	Hip tiles are tiles used to cover the gap formed where two sloping roofs meet.
Hip starters and terminals	Concrete hip starter on roof in Porto Santo Island, Portugal	Terminals are ridge tile fittings that are used as an endcap on the gable end or apex of a roof. In some cases these can be highly decorative, taking the form of a sculpture or figurine, while in others they can be more practical and architectural in nature. Hip starters play a similar role, except that they are designed to be used as the beginning coarse of a hip instead of a ridge.
Graduated tiles	Graduated clay roof tiles on a cone	Graduated roof tiles are tiles designed to "graduate" in size from top to bottom, with smaller tiles at the top and larger ones at the bottom. They are necessary when installing a tile roof on a tower, cone, or dome and need to be specially designed for each roof they are used on for effective functionality.
Antefix	Antefix	An antefix is a vertical block which terminates and conceals the base of a mission, imbrex and tegula, or pantile roof.
Under eave tiles	Painted under-eave tile, Sri Lanka, 5th century	Tiles, often ornamental, applied beneath the eave of a roof structure. Found in temple architecture of Sri Lanka, among other locations.

== Characteristics ==
=== Durability ===
The durability of roofing tiles varies greatly based on material composition and manufacture. Durability is directly related to three factors; a resistance to chemical decomposition, a low porosity, and a high breaking strength.

==== Chemical decomposition ====
Clay and slate tiles are stable materials and naturally resistant to chemical decomposition, however plastic composite tiles and concrete tiles will experience inevitable decay over time. As a result of this, high-quality clay and slate tiles have a proven lifespan of over 100 years, whereas synthetic and concrete tiles usually have a practical lifespan of 30–50 years. In the case of synthetic plastic tiles, this is purely an estimation since the oldest products on the market date to around 2000. The main cause of plastic tile decay is exposure to ultraviolet radiation, which weakens the chemical bonds of the material and causes the tiles to become more brittle over time.

A common effect seen in concrete and cement roof tiles is efflorescence, which is caused by the presence of free lime within concrete. This lime reacts with water to form calcium hydroxide, which creates a chalky deposit on the outside of the tiles. While not detrimental to the strength or durability of the cement tiles, this effect is considered unappealing.

==== Porosity ====
Tiles with a porosity above 2% allow for intrusion and absorption of water, which can be detrimental in climates with freeze-thaw conditions or salt air intrusion. During a freeze-thaw cycle, water that infiltrates a tile will see volume expansions of 9% upon freezing, which exerts pressure within any pores it manages to enter and causes cracks to grow. When the ice melts, water spreads further into those cracks and will then apply more stress to them upon the next freeze. A similar effect can be seen in areas near the ocean that experience salt-air intrusion, which can lead to salt crystal permeation and expansion.

Clay tile porosity can range greatly depending on quality of production, but some manufacturers can achieve less than 2% moisture absorption. Concrete roof tiles tend to feature around 13% moisture absorption, which requires periodic resealing every 3–7 years to avoid critical failure. The inherent porosity of cement requires that cement tiles are made very heavy and thick, as a result they have continuously been one of the heaviest roofing materials in the market.

It is commonly believed that a porous clay tile can be waterproofed through the application of a glaze; however studies have shown that this is not the case. If a clay body contains significant pores, water will permeate them over time regardless of exterior coating.

==== Breaking strength ====
The breaking strength of clay tiles can vary greatly by manufacturer, depending on a combination of factors such as their firing temperature, specific clay composition, and length of the firing cycle. Despite the common conception of clay tiles being fragile, higher-grade manufacturers produce tiles with breaking strengths ranging from 700 to 1500 pounds.

The breaking strength of plastic roof tiles varies greatly depending on temperature. Unlike ceramics or metals, plastics have glass transition temperatures that fall within the range of winter temperatures, often resulting in them becoming extremely brittle during colder periods.

=== Color ===
Clay roof tiles historically gained their color purely from the clay that they were composed of, resulting in largely red, orange, and tan colored roofs. Over time some cultures, notably in Asia, began to apply glazes to clay tiles, achieving a wide variety of colors and combinations.

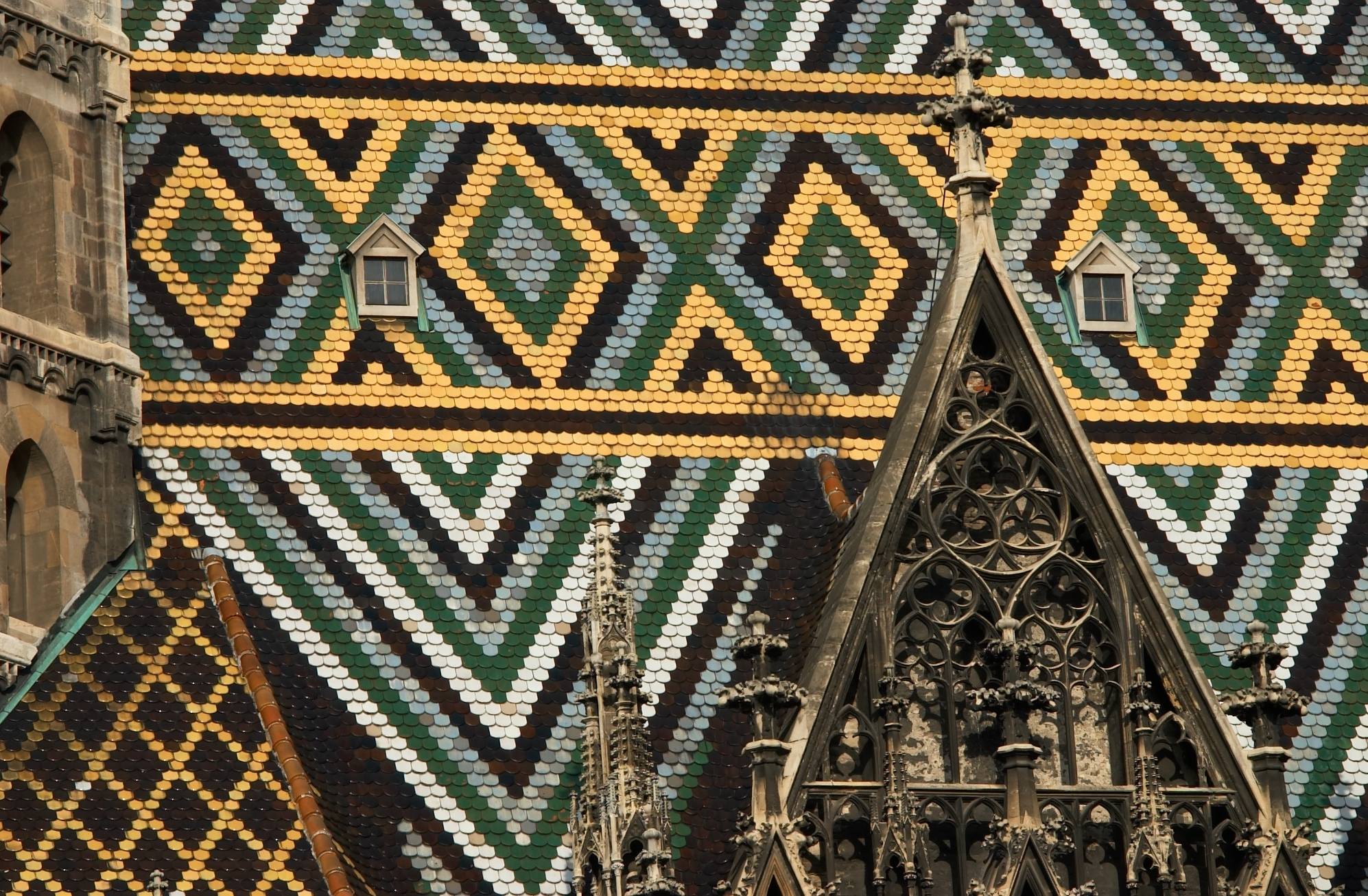
Glazed roof tiles arranged in a pattern on St. Stephen's Cathedral, Vienna, Austria

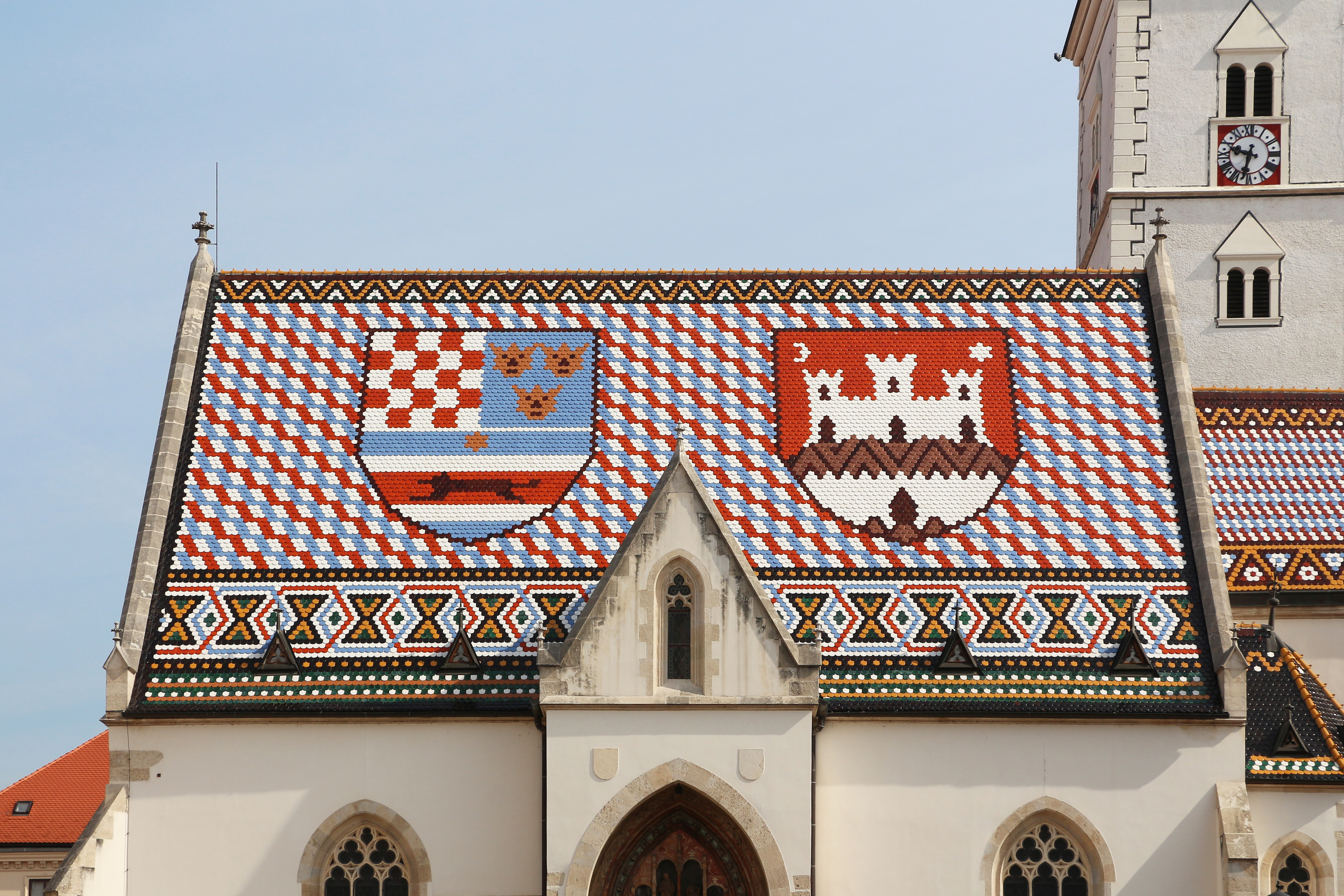
Colourful roof tiles on St. Mark's Church, Zagreb, Croatia

Originally, most color variation on matte clay tiles was caused by variation in kiln firing temperature, kiln atmospheric conditions, and in some cases reductive firing. Many producers have shifted away from this process since low firing temperatures typically result in a higher porosity and lower breaking strength.

Engobes are now commonly used to replicate the appearance of historic firing variation, using a thin colored ceramic coating which chemically bonds to the tile to provide any range of matte colors to the fired tiles while allowing consistent firing conditions. Glazes are used when a shinier gloss appearance is desired. Like their clay base, both engobes and glazes are fully impervious to color fading regardless of UV exposure, which makes them unique among artificial colorants.

The color of slate tiles is a result of the amount and type of iron and organic material that are present, and most often ranges from light to dark gray. Some shades of slate used for roofing can be shades of green, red, black, purple, and brown.

Cement tiles typically are colored either through the use of a pigment added to the cement body, or through a concentrated slurry coat of cement-infused pigment on the outside of the tiles. Due to the simple production process and comparatively low firing temperature, cement tiles fade over time and often require painting to restore a "new" appearance.

Plastic tiles are colored through the incorporation of synthetic dyes added to them during molding. As a result of their reactive chemical composition they can suffer degradation from UV rays and fade after a few years of use.

=== Maintenance ===
When installed correctly, clay and slate tiles require virtually no maintenance. The most common causes of failure in roofs of these types stem from a breakdown in the fastening system of nails or screws, or failure of the underlying support beams.

If metal flashing, gutters, and downspouts deteriorate or become clogged with debris, water can become trapped and seep into the underlying wooden structure, leading to weakening and eventually rotting. Other factors such as falling tree limbs, vandalism, or poor installation can also lead to breakage of individual tiles.

It is recommended to avoid patching or repairing missing clay tiles with other materials such as concrete, metal, or plastic. Additionally, the use of tar, caulk, asphalt as a way of sealing leaks can generally lead to further deterioration. When tiles are damaged and need replacement, the best option is usually to source similar tiles of the same material and remove an entire section of roofing around the damaged area, before reinstalling with the new tiles after making sure the substructure is unharmed.

Cement and plastic tiles degrade over time and will eventually require complete replacement.

== Gallery ==
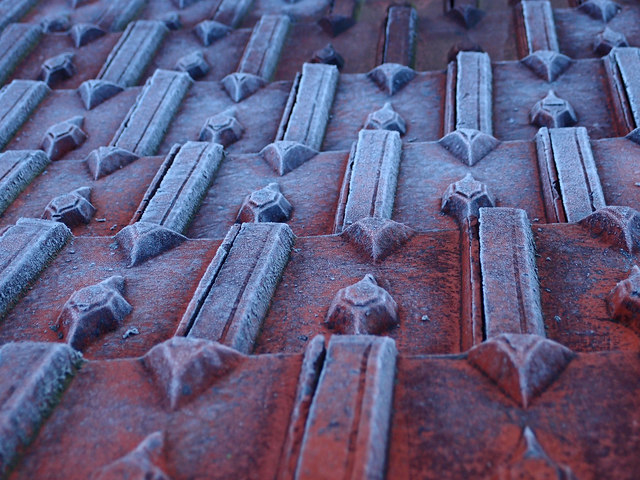
Frost on interlocking roof tiles in Britain

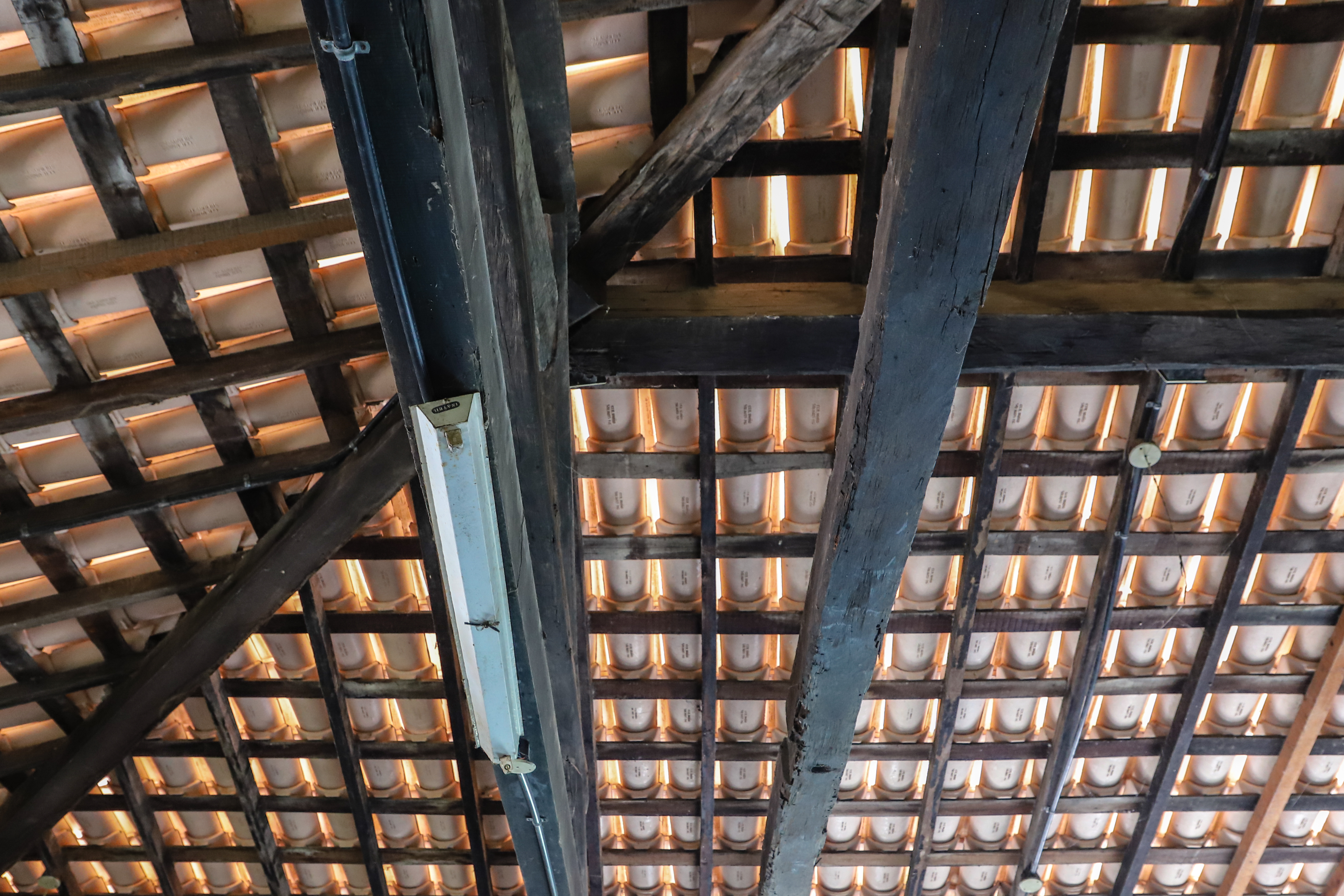
Underside of mission tile roof in Brazil, installed without underlayment or understructure

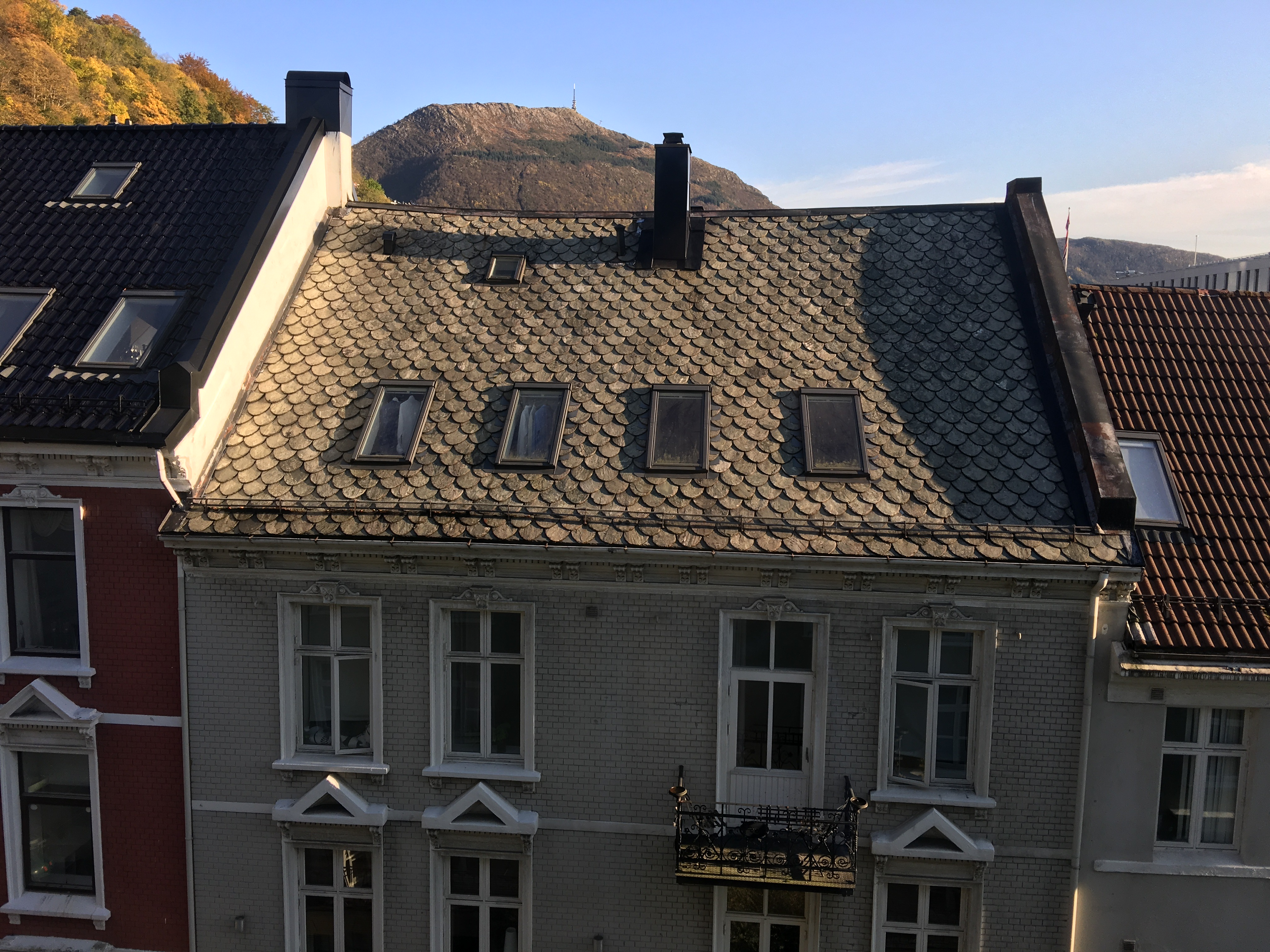
Slate tile roof in Norway

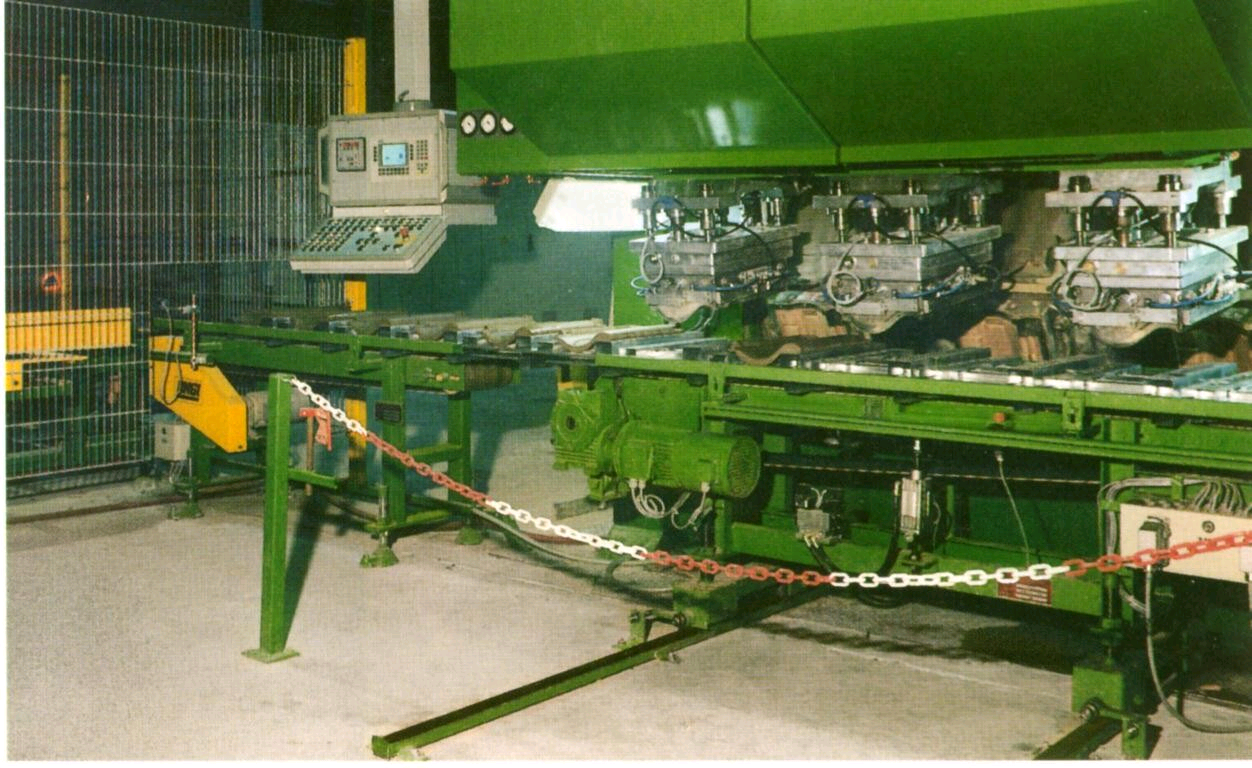
Modern tile press in Europe

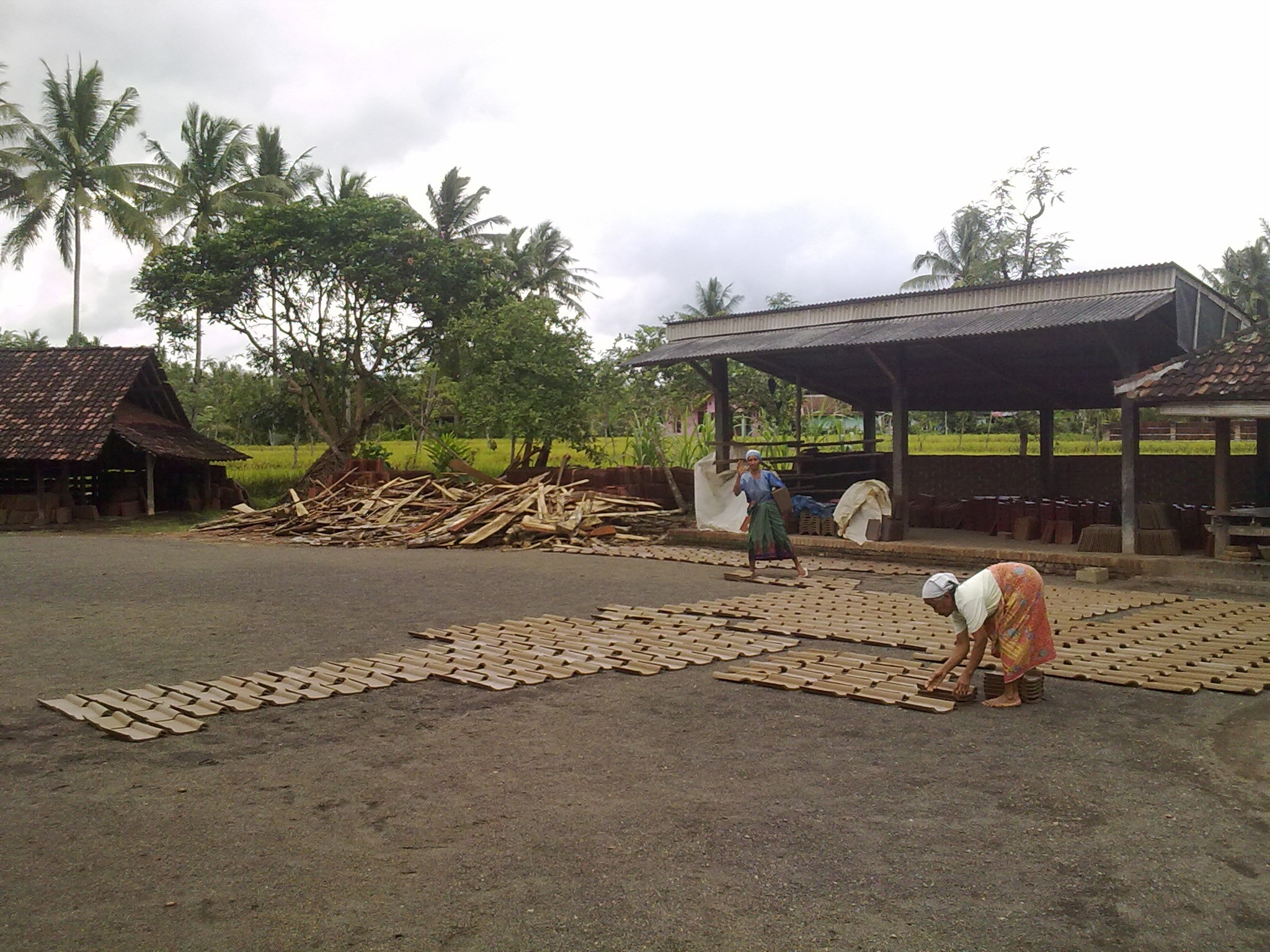
Drying traditional pantiles prior to firing in Lombok, Indonesia

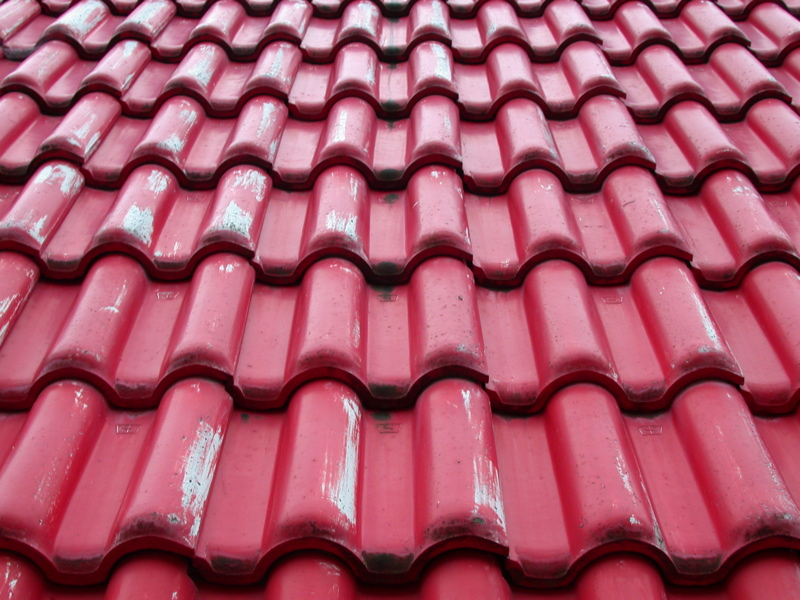
Interlocking tile designed to look like pantile

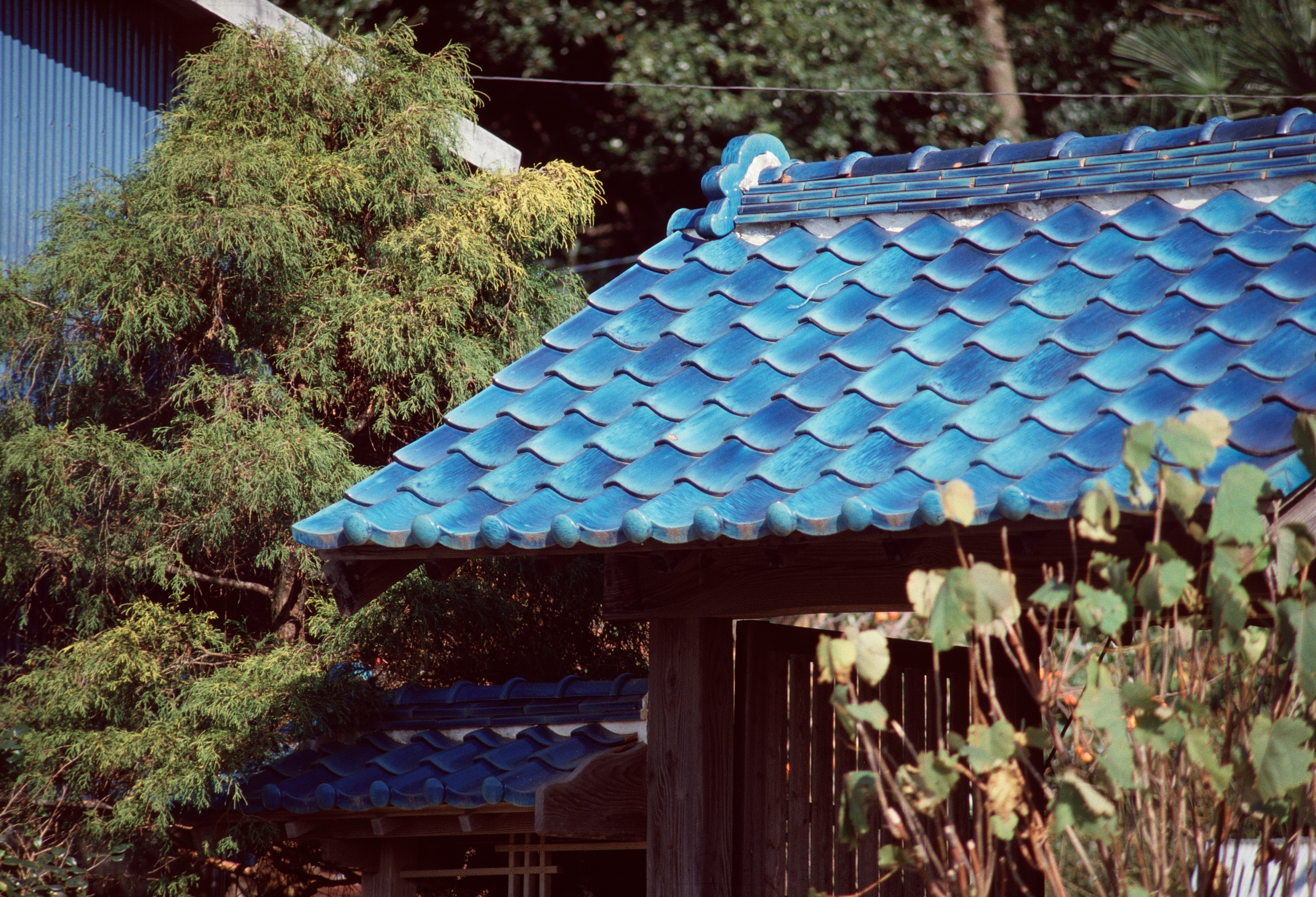
Gloss blue roof tiles in Japan

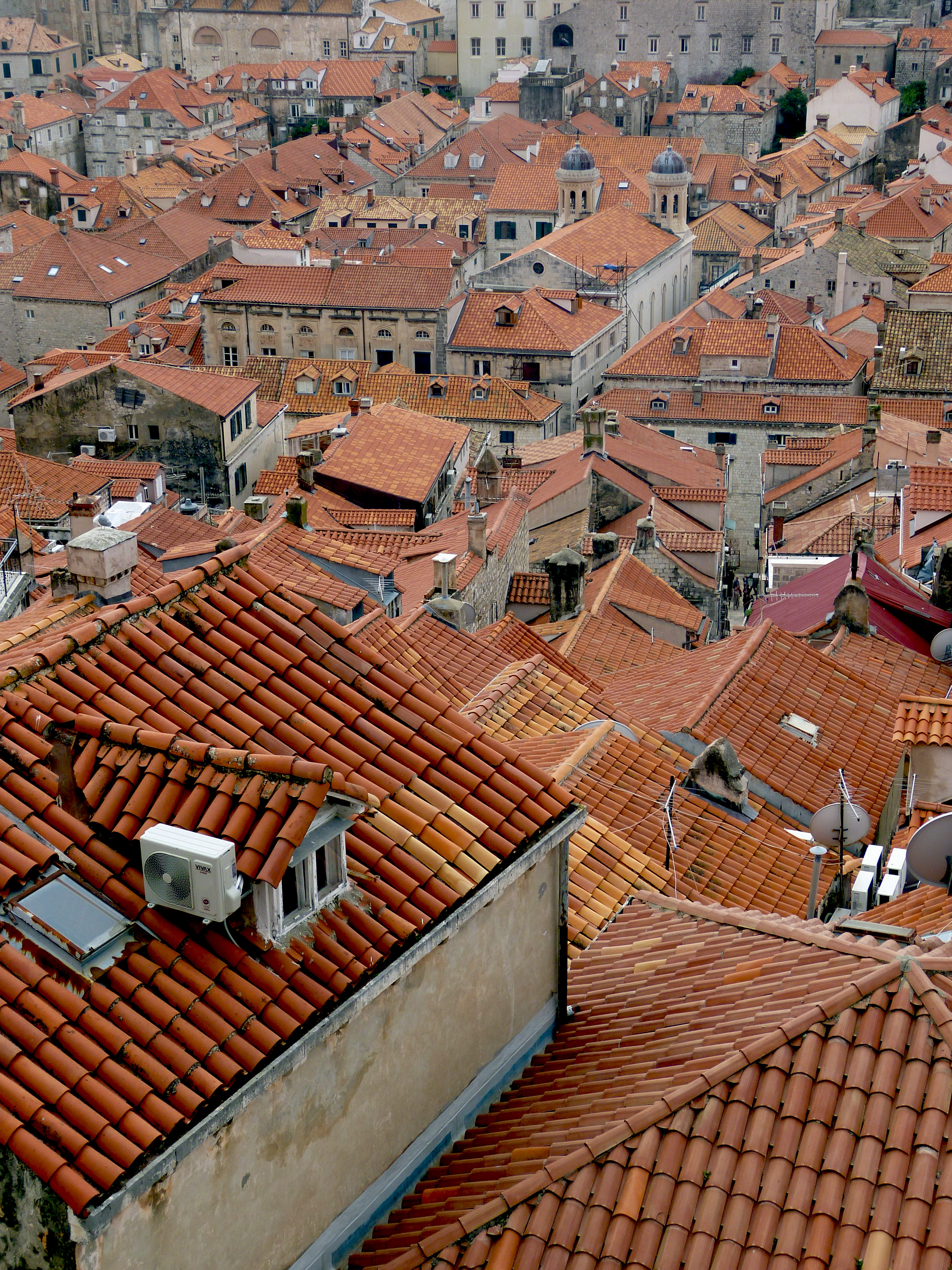
Tile rooftops seen in Dubrovnik, Croatia

== See also ==
- Covering (construction)
