= Eutresis culture =

Neolithic and Early Bronze Age archaeological culture in mainland Greece

- Period: Late Neolithic, Early Bronze Age
- Dates: c. 3200 BC – 2650 BC
- Preceded by: Neolithic Greece
- Followed by: Korakou culture

Eutresis culture is a Final Neolithic and Early Bronze Age culture in mainland Greece, also known as Early Helladic I in Helladic chronology. It was developed directly out of central and southern Greek Final Neolithic culture and lasted roughly from c. 3200 to c. 2650 BC.

The culture is named after the site of Eutresis excavated in 1958.

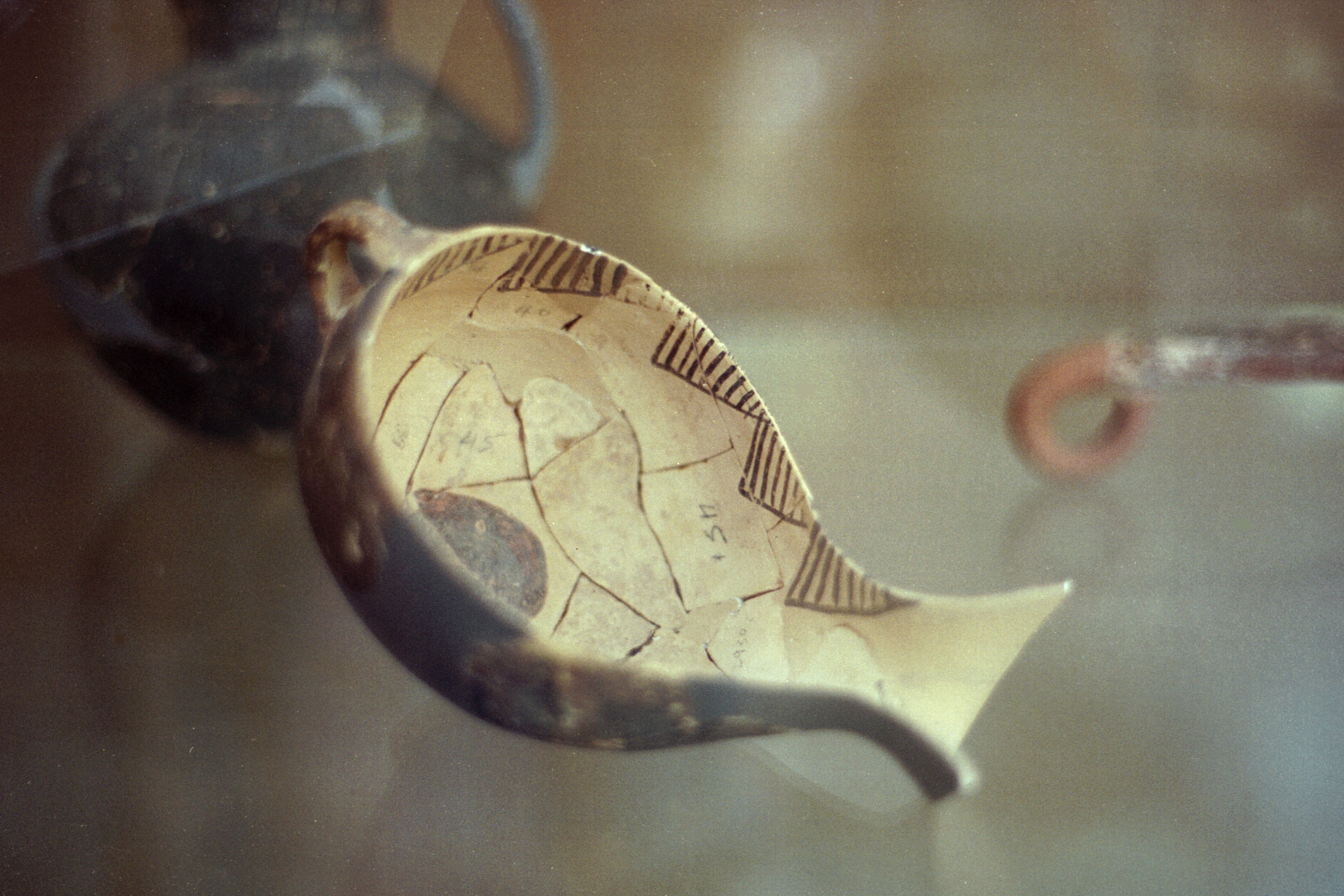
Early Helladic pottery (3rd millennium BC)

- Materials and architecture: stones, bones, clay objects and (rarely) metal are the main materials used in everyday life. A distinct fabric was employed for cooking vessels, which were normally dark surfaced. Several jars for storage and cooking have been discovered. Signs of fortifications have been discovered in the Perachora area. It is believed that most houses were simple, with one or two rooms.
- End: it was followed by the more advanced Korakou culture in Greece during the Early Helladic II period of the Early Helladic chronology in the first half of the 3rd millennium BC.
