= House of the Tiles =

Bronze Age building in Lerna, Greece

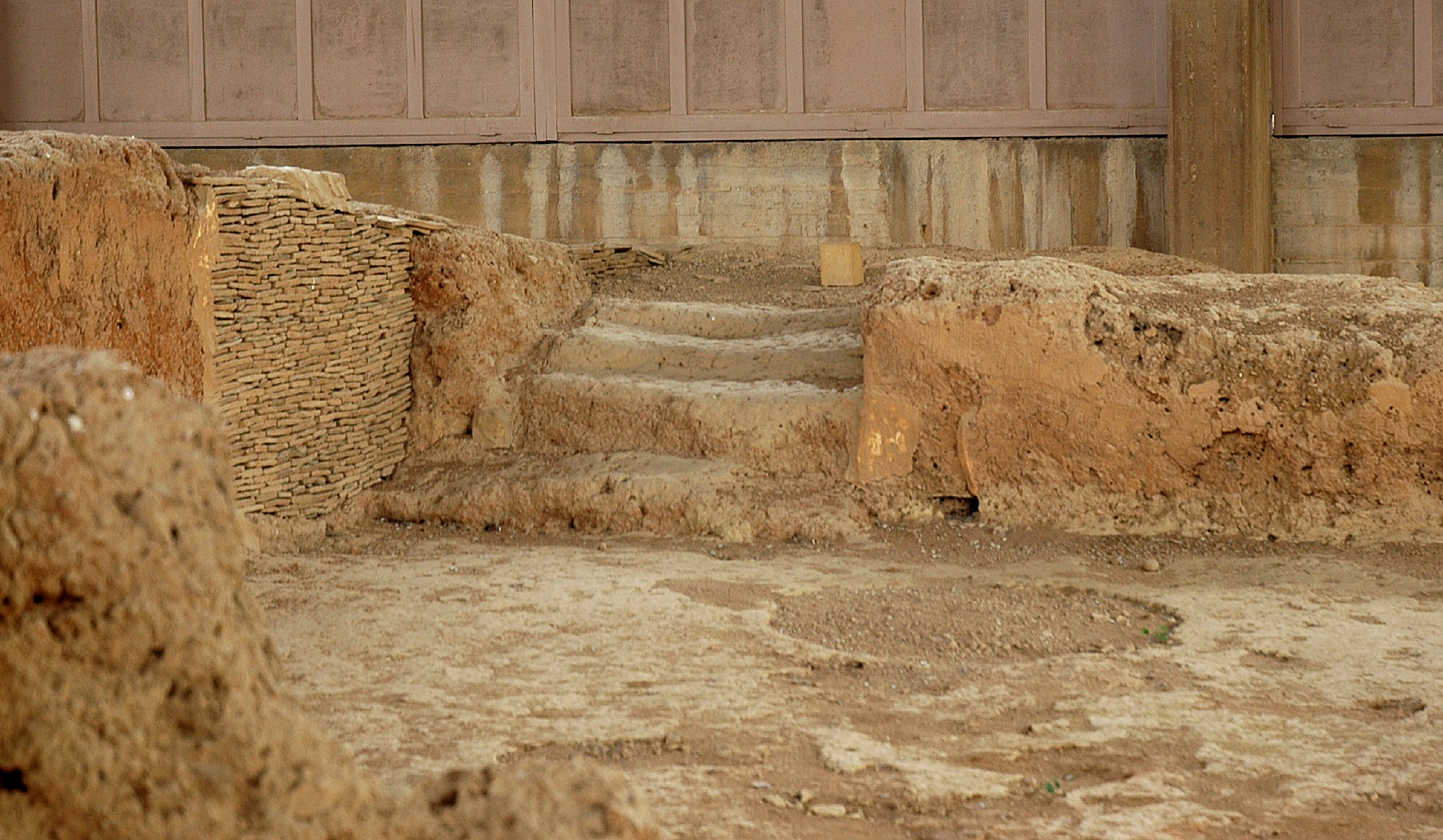
- Remains of the house's stairway

- Shown within the Peloponnese
- 37.5512°N 22.7183°E
- Type: Corridor house
- Cultures: Korakou culture
- Location: Lerna, Peloponnese, Greece

History
- Built: c. 2400 BC
- Abandoned: c. 2150 BC

Site notes
- Area: 12 m × 25 m (39 ft × 82 ft)
- Excavation dates: 1950s
- Archaeologists: John Caskey

The House of the Tiles is a monumental Early Bronze Age building (two stories, approximately 12 x 25 m) located at the archaeological site of Lerna in southern Greece. It is notable for several architectural features that were advanced for its time during the Helladic period, notably its roof covered by baked tiles, which gave the building its name. The building belongs to the "corridor house" type.

== History ==
=== Excavation ===
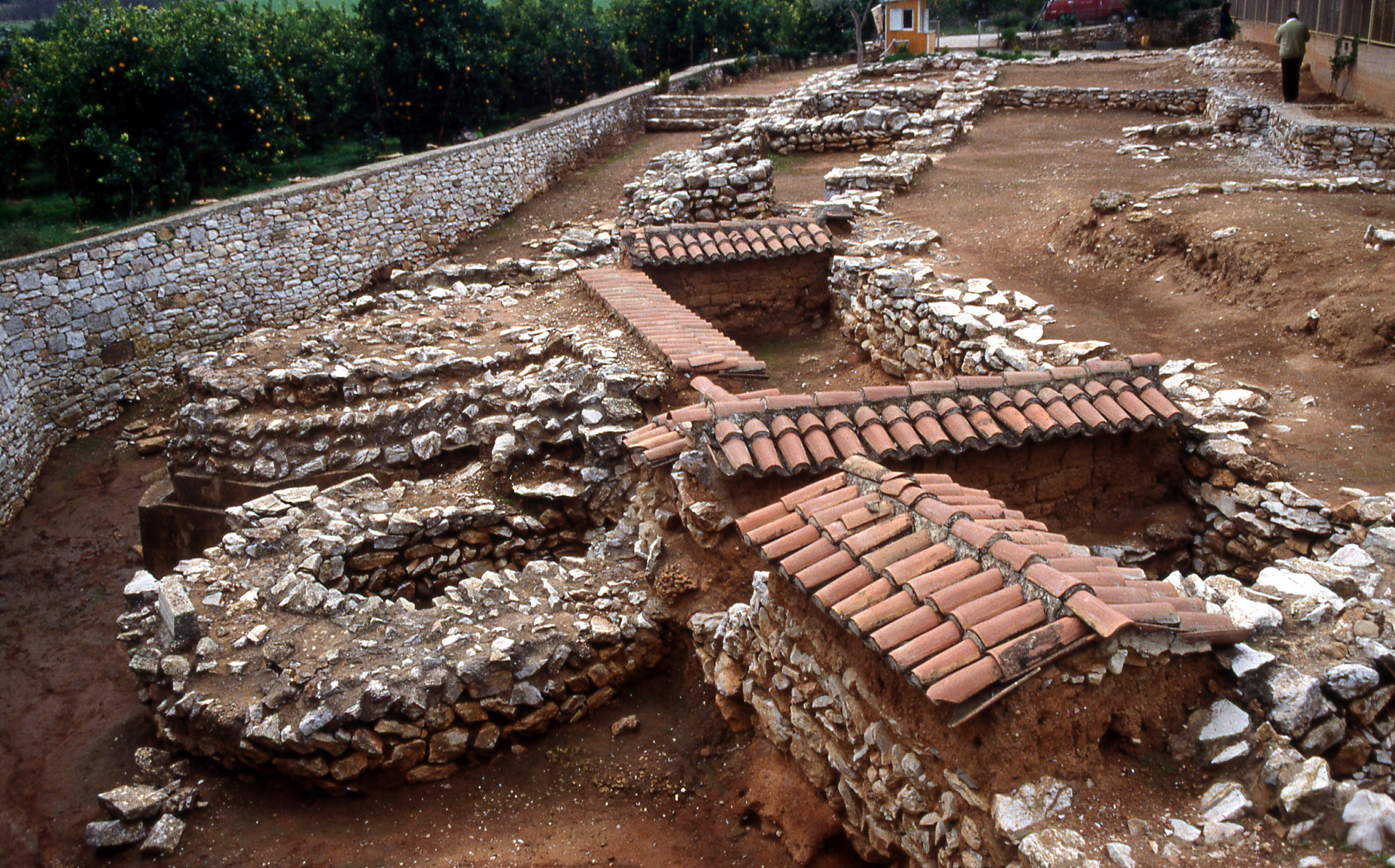
Lerna archaeological site with remains of buildings and fortifications

The site was excavated during the early 1950s by the American School of Classical Studies under the direction of John Caskey of the University of Cincinnati.

=== Structure ===
The structure dates to the Korakou culture, also known as the Early Helladic II period (2500–2300 BC) and is sometimes interpreted as the dwelling of an elite member of the community, a proto-palace, or an administrative center. Alternatively, it has also been considered to be a communal structure, i.e., the common property of the townspeople. The exact function remains unknown due to a lack of small finds indicating the specific uses of the building. The house had a stairway leading to a second story and was protected by a tiled roof; it also contained storage areas. Debris found at the site contained thousands of terracotta tiles having fallen from the roof. Although such roofs were also found in the Early Helladic site of Akovitika and later in the Mycenaean towns of Gla and Midea, they only became common in Greek architecture in the 7th century BC. The walls of the "House of the Tiles" were constructed with sun-dried bricks on stone socles.

=== Destruction ===
Carbon-14 dating indicates that the House of the Tiles was finally destroyed by fire in the 22nd century BC. Not long after the destruction, the place was cleared in such a way as to leave a low tumulus over the site. The destruction of both the building and the building site was first attributed by John Langdon Caskey to an invasion of Greeks and/or Indo-Europeans during the Early Helladic III period. John Coleman, however, argued in 2000 that the elaborate structure of the tumulus built during the Early Helladic III period over the ruins of the House of the Tiles indicates a "showing of respect for their predecessors that one would not expect of invaders of a different culture."
