= Neolithic Greece =

Greece from 7000–3200 BC

- Map of Greece showing Neolithic sites (clickable map).
- Period: Neolithic Europe
- Dates: c. 7000 – c. 3200 BC
- Major sites: Nea Nikomedeia, Sesklo, Dimini, Franchthi Cave, Athens, Knossos, Milos
- Characteristics: Socioeconomic and architectural developments
- Preceded by: Balkan Mesolithic, Pre-Pottery Neolithic B
- Followed by: Sesklo culture, Cycladic culture, Minoan civilization, Helladic period, Cardium pottery, Starčevo culture, Eutresis culture, Korakou culture, Tiryns culture

Neolithic Greece is the Neolithic phase of Greek history, beginning with the spread of farming to Greece in 7000–6500 BC, and ending around 3200 BC. During this period, many developments occurred such as the establishment and expansion of a mixed farming and stock-rearing economy, architectural innovations (i.e. "megaron-type" and "Tsangli-type" houses), as well as elaborate art and tool manufacturing. Neolithic Greece is part of the Prehistory of Southeastern Europe.

== Periodization ==
The Neolithic Revolution reached Europe beginning in 7000–6500 BC, during the Pre-Pottery Neolithic B period, when agriculturalists from the Near East entered the Greek peninsula from Anatolia mainly by island-hopping through the Aegean Sea. Modern archaeologists have divided the Neolithic period of Greek history into six phases: Pre-Pottery, Early Neolithic, Middle Neolithic, Late Neolithic I, Late Neolithic II and Final Neolithic (or Chalcolithic).

Period	Approximate date
Pre-Pottery (or Aceramic)	6800–6500 BC
Early Neolithic	6500–5800 BC
Middle Neolithic	5800–5300 BC
Late Neolithic I	5300–4800 BC
Late Neolithic II	4800–4500 BC
Final Neolithic (or Chalcolithic)	4500–3200 BC

== Sites of Neolithic Greece ==
These are the estimated populations of hamlets, villages, and towns of Neolithic Greece over time. There are several problems with estimating the sizes of individual settlements, and the highest estimates for a given settlements, in a given period, may be several times the lowest.

Town	7000 BC	6000 BC	5000 BC	4000 BC	3800 BC	3700 BC
Nea Nikomedeia		500–700				
Sesklo			1000–5000			
Dimini						
Athens						
Poliochne						
Knossos	25	50	500–1000	500–1000		
Trapeza						
Gerani						
Lerna						
Kefala						
Alepotrypa cave						
Milos						
Servia						

== Pre-Ceramic 6800–6500 BC ==
The Pre-Ceramic (or Aceramic) period of Neolithic Greece is characterized by the absence of baked clay pots and an economy based on farming and stock-rearing. Settlements consisted of subterranean huts partially dug into the ground with communities inhabited by 50 to 100 people in places such as Argissa Magoula (Thessaly), Dendra (Argolid) and Franchthi. The inhabitants cultivated various crops (i.e. einkorn, emmer wheat, barley, lentils and peas), engaged in fishing, hunting, animal husbandry (i.e. raising cattle, pigs, sheep, dogs and goats), developed tools (i.e. blades made from flint and obsidian) and produced jewellery from clay, seashells, bone and stone.

Knossos has an extremely long history that begins during the Pre-Ceramic period. The first Neolithic settlements in Knosos area were developed in 6,500 - 7,000 BC according to modern radiocarbon. Arthur Evans, who revealed the Minoan Knossos palace, estimated that during the late 8th Millennium or early 9th Millennium BC Neolithic people arrived in the area, probably from overseas, possibly from Western Anatolia and established their primitive communities in the local hill.

The volcanic island of Milos has been visited for the exploitation of its obsidian for the manufacture of tools and weapons, from the Mesolithic until the late Neolithic period. Natural resources from Milos were transported over vast distances all over the Aegean, mainland Greece, Western Anatolia and possibly as far as Egypt. The oldest findings of Milos obsidians outside the island occurs in the Mesolithic (9000–7800 BC), at the Franchti cave in the Argolid. There is no evidence of settlements on Milos island until the Final Neolithic (4000 BC). The exploitation of obsidian seems to be performed by groups of different people landing intermittently on the island, for the periodic supply of stone for tools making.

== Early Neolithic (EN) 6500–5800 BC ==
The Pre-Ceramic period of Neolithic Greece was succeeded by the Early Neolithic period (or EN) where the economy was still based on farming and stock-rearing and settlements still consisted of independent one-room huts with each community inhabited by 50 to 100 people (the basic social unit was the clan or extended family). Hearths and ovens were constructed in open spaces between the huts and were commonly used. During the Early Neolithic period, pottery technology involving the successful firing of vases was developed and burial customs consisted of inhumation in rudimentary pits, cremation of the dead, bone collection, and cemetery interment.

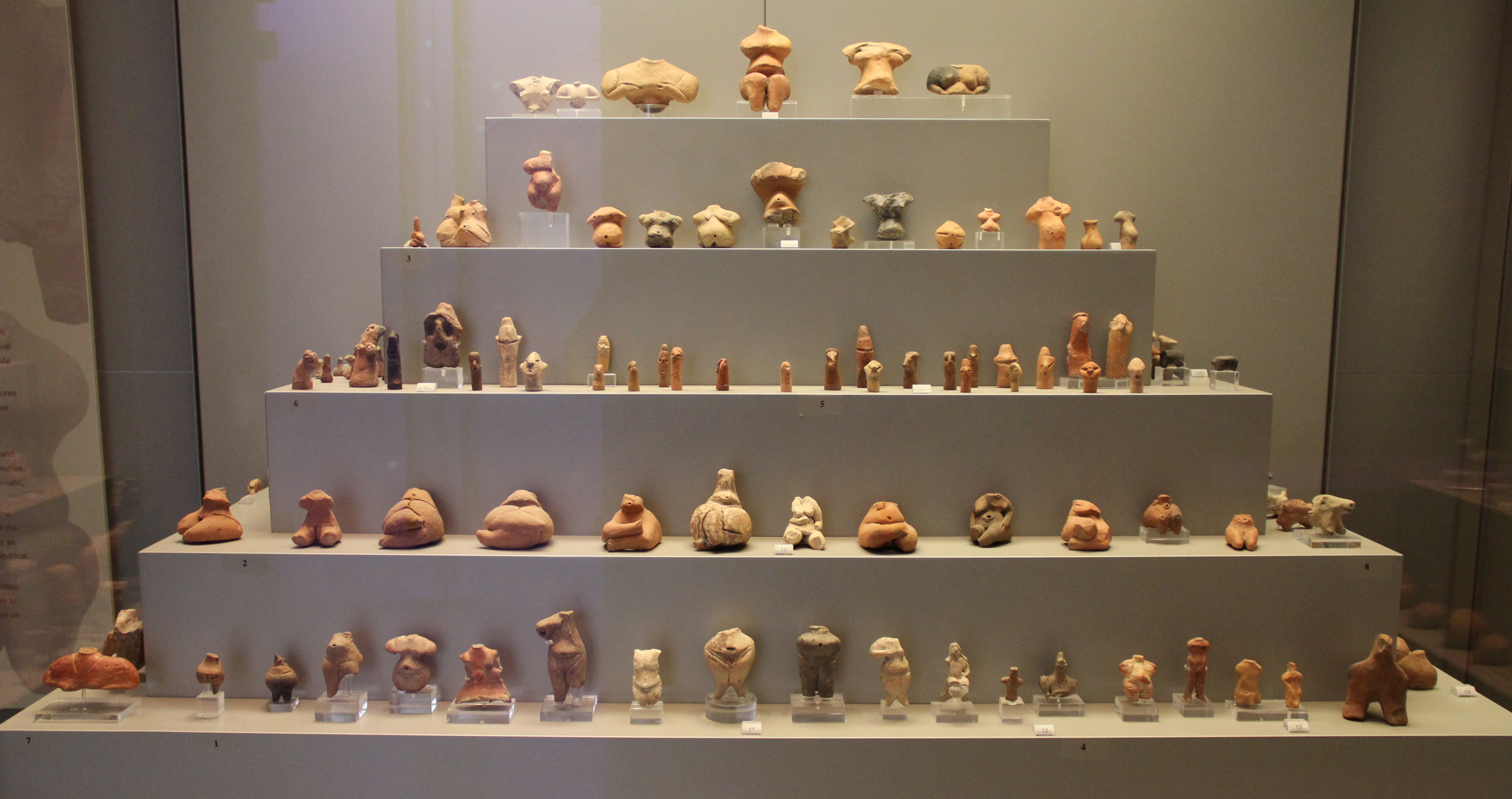
Early and Middle Neolithic clay figurines from Thessaly, 6500–5300 BC

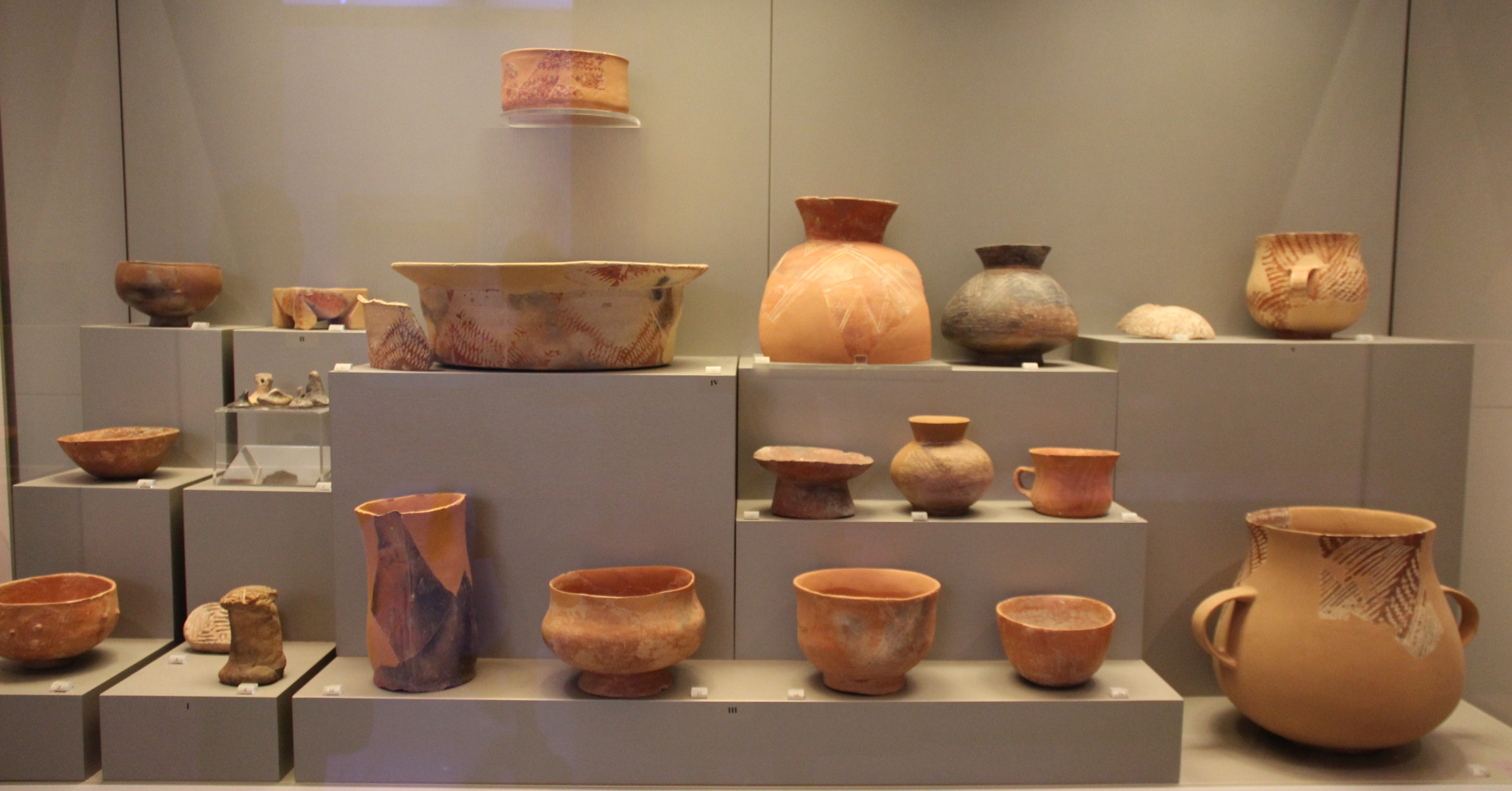
Early and Middle Neolithic pottery, 6500–5300 BC; in the National Archaeological Museum, Athens

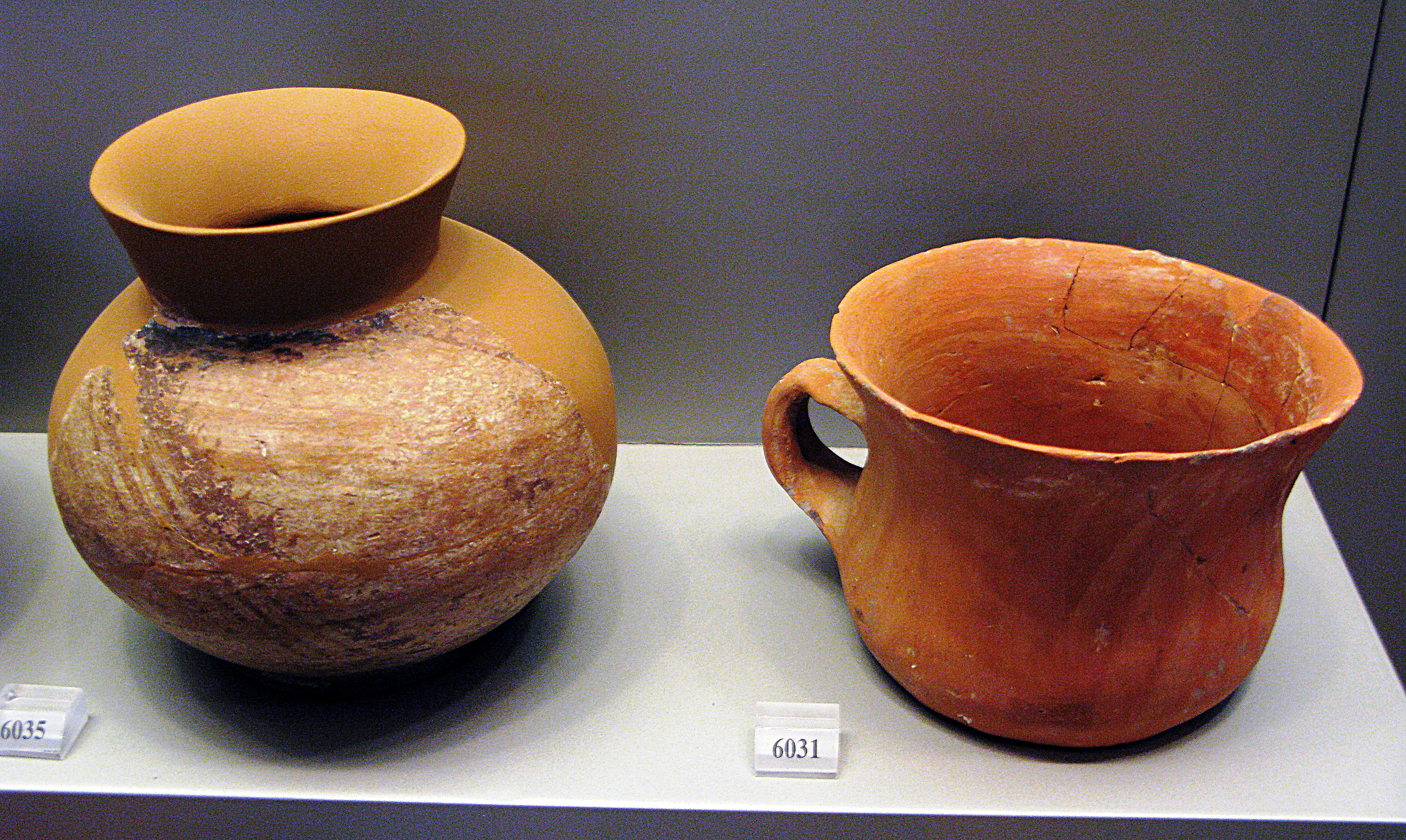
Monochrome bowls from Sesklo, Early Neolithic period (6500–5800 BC); in the National Archaeological Museum, Athens

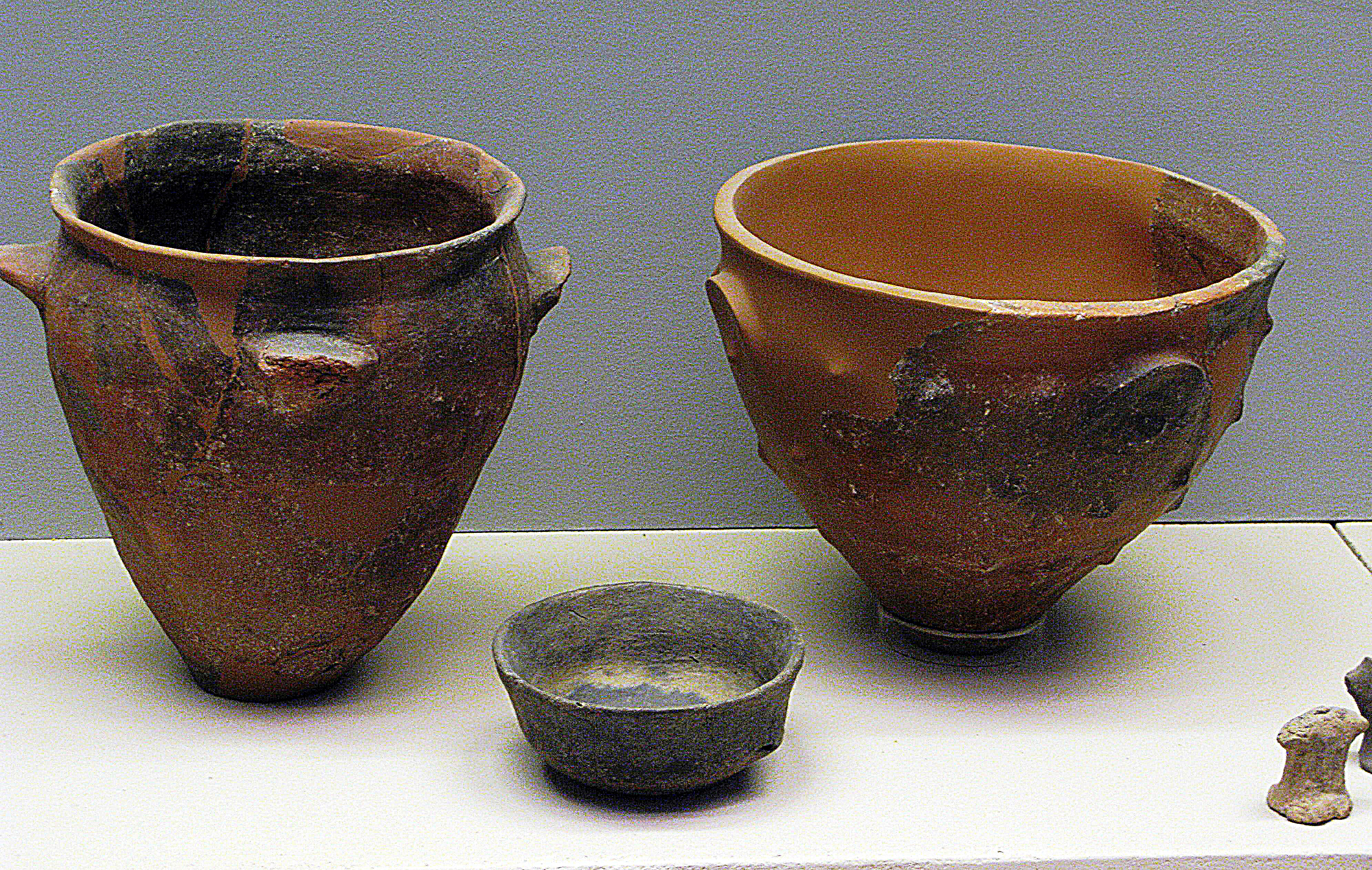
Neolithic clay cups from Sesklo; in the National Archaeological Museum, Athens

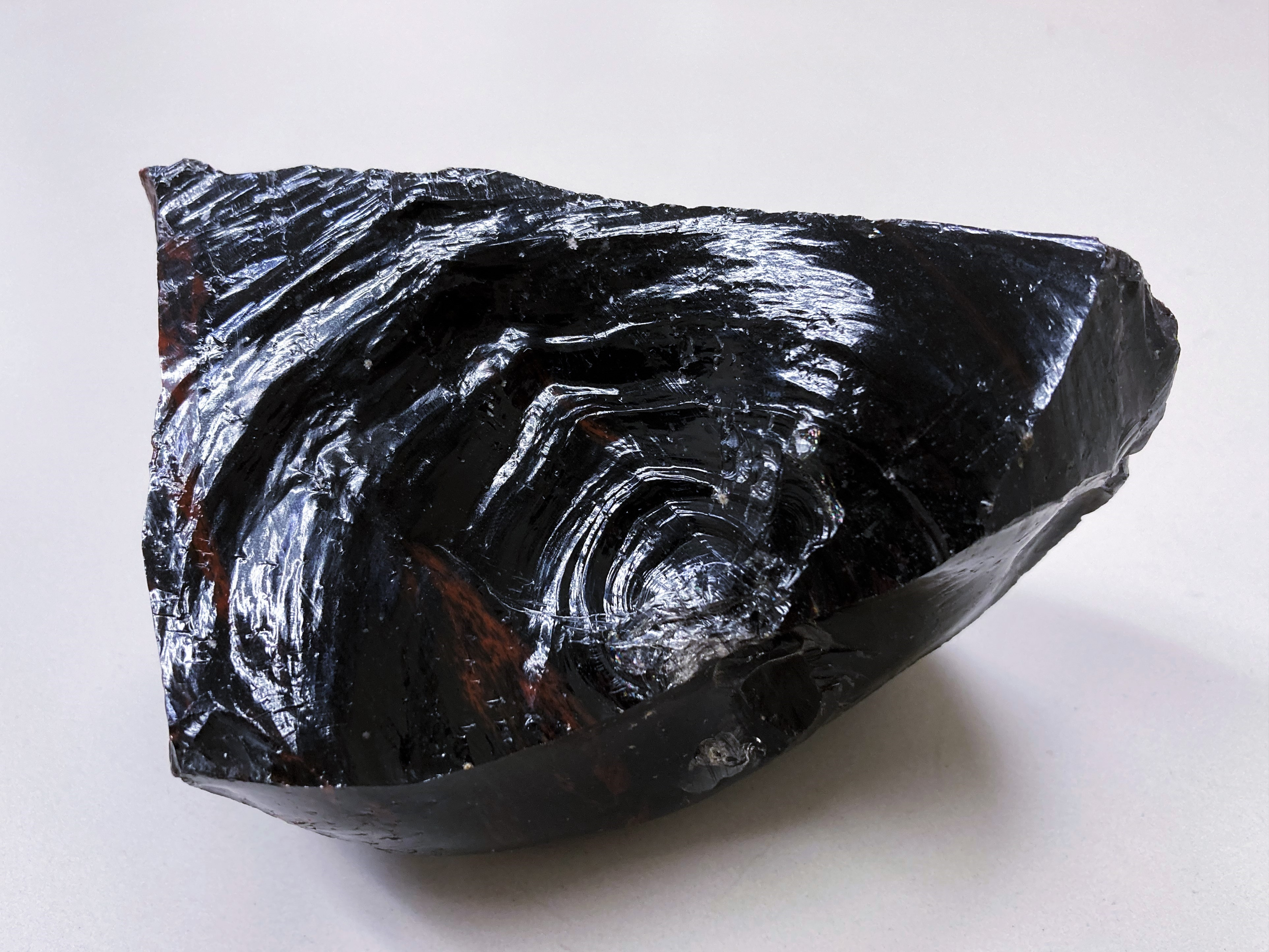
Obsidian, used for making tools and weapons

== Middle Neolithic (MN) 5800–5300 BC ==
The Middle Neolithic period (or MN) is characterized by new architectural developments such as houses constructed with stone foundations and the development of megaron-type dwellings (rectangular one-roomed houses with open or closed porches). Furthermore, the "Tsangli-type" house, named after the settlement of Tsangli, was first developed during the Middle Neolithic period; the "Tsangli-type" dwelling has two interior buttresses on each side (designed to support the roof of the house and divide the dwelling space into separate rooms for distinct functions such as storage, food preparation and sleep quarters) with a row of posts in the center of the square room. In the realm of art, the meander-labyrinth motif was found on seals and jewellery of the Early Neolithic period and, to a lesser extent, of the Middle Neolithic period. The Middle Neolithic period ended with the devastation of certain settlements by fire; communities such as Sesklo were abandoned whereas communities such as Tsangli-Larisa were immediately re-inhabited.

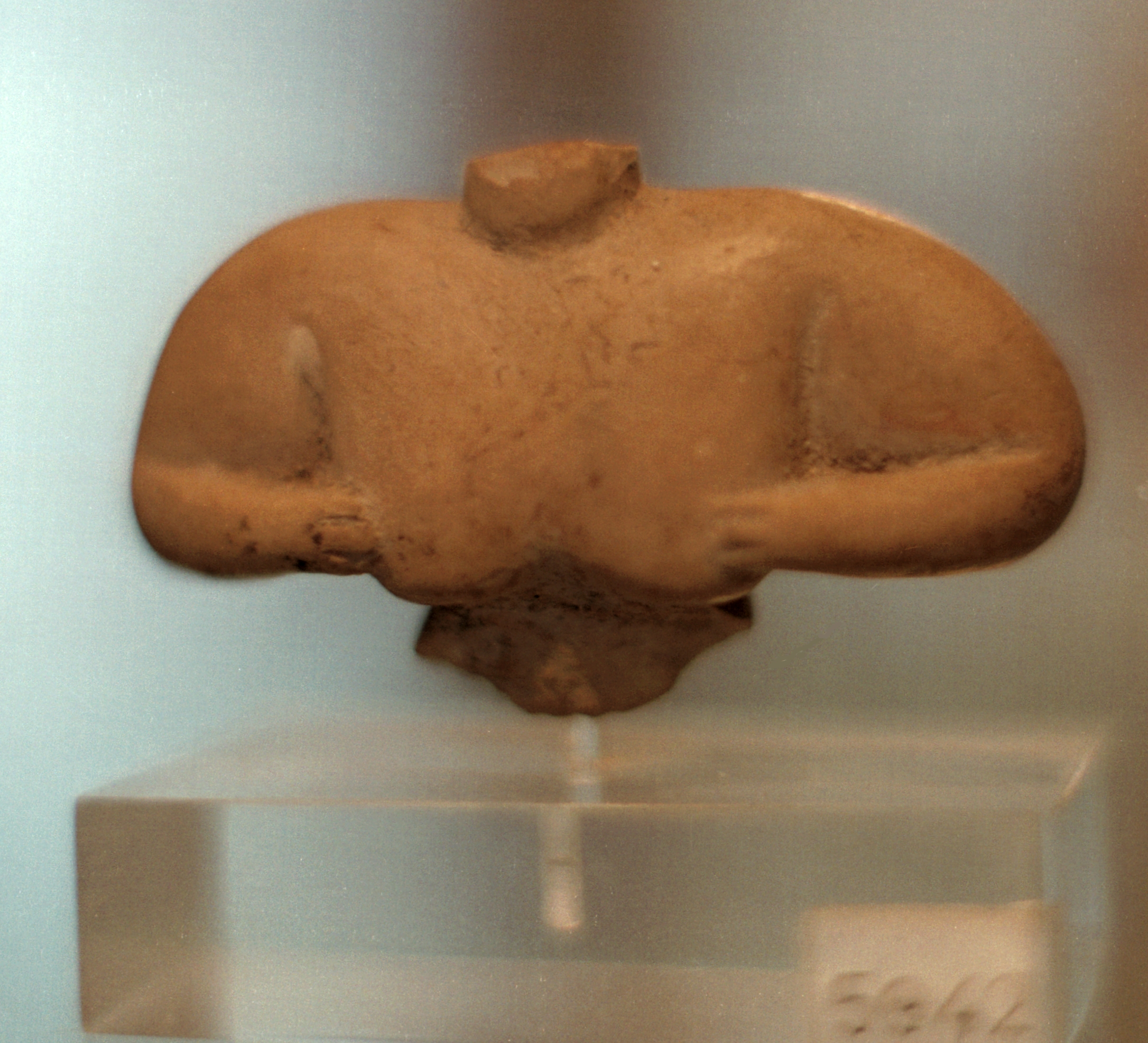
Torso of woman with hands on chest, small terracotta, Sesklo culture, Neolithic, 6th–5th millennium BC

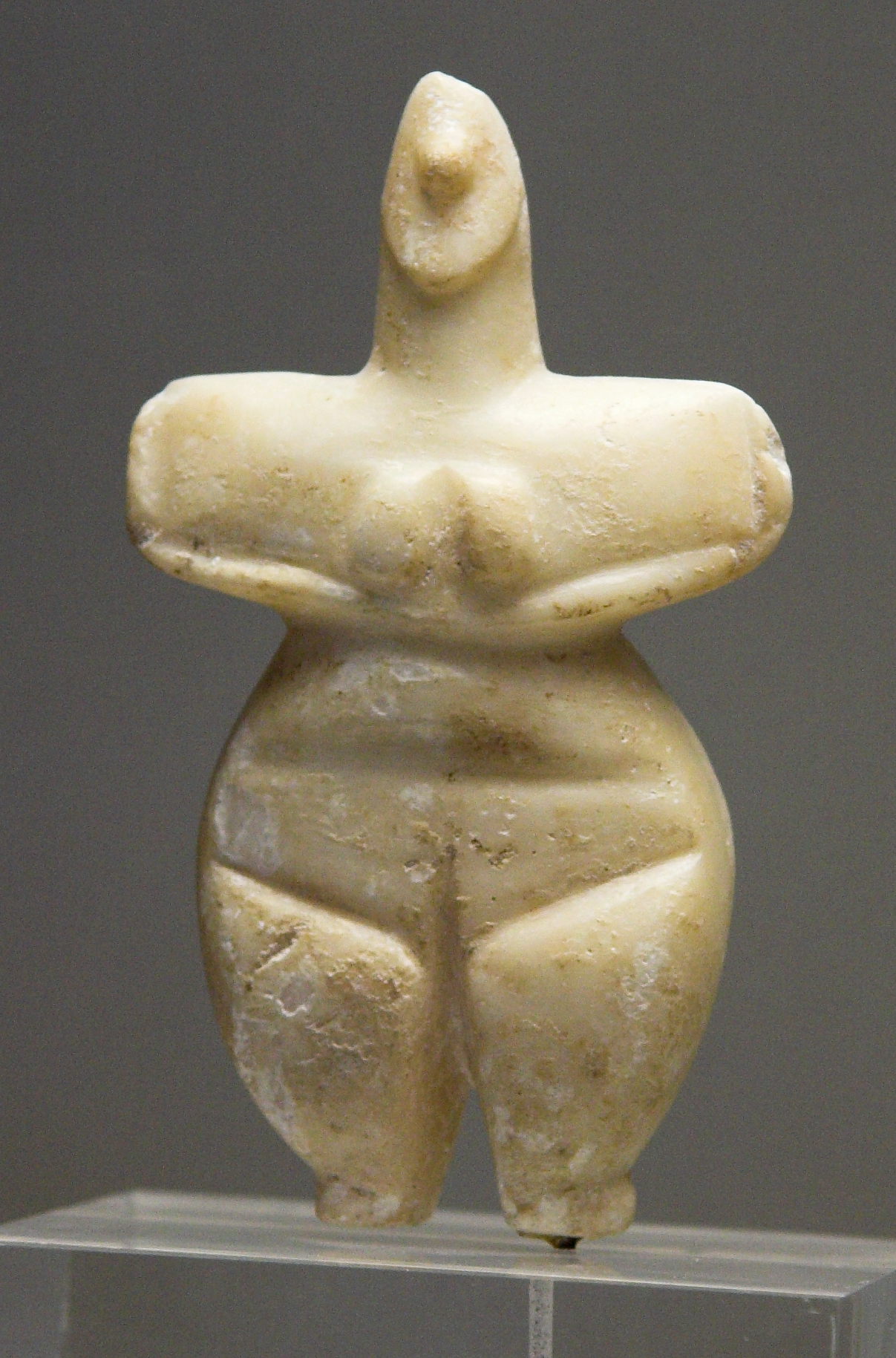
Female figurine, marble, Thessaly, 5300–3300 BC

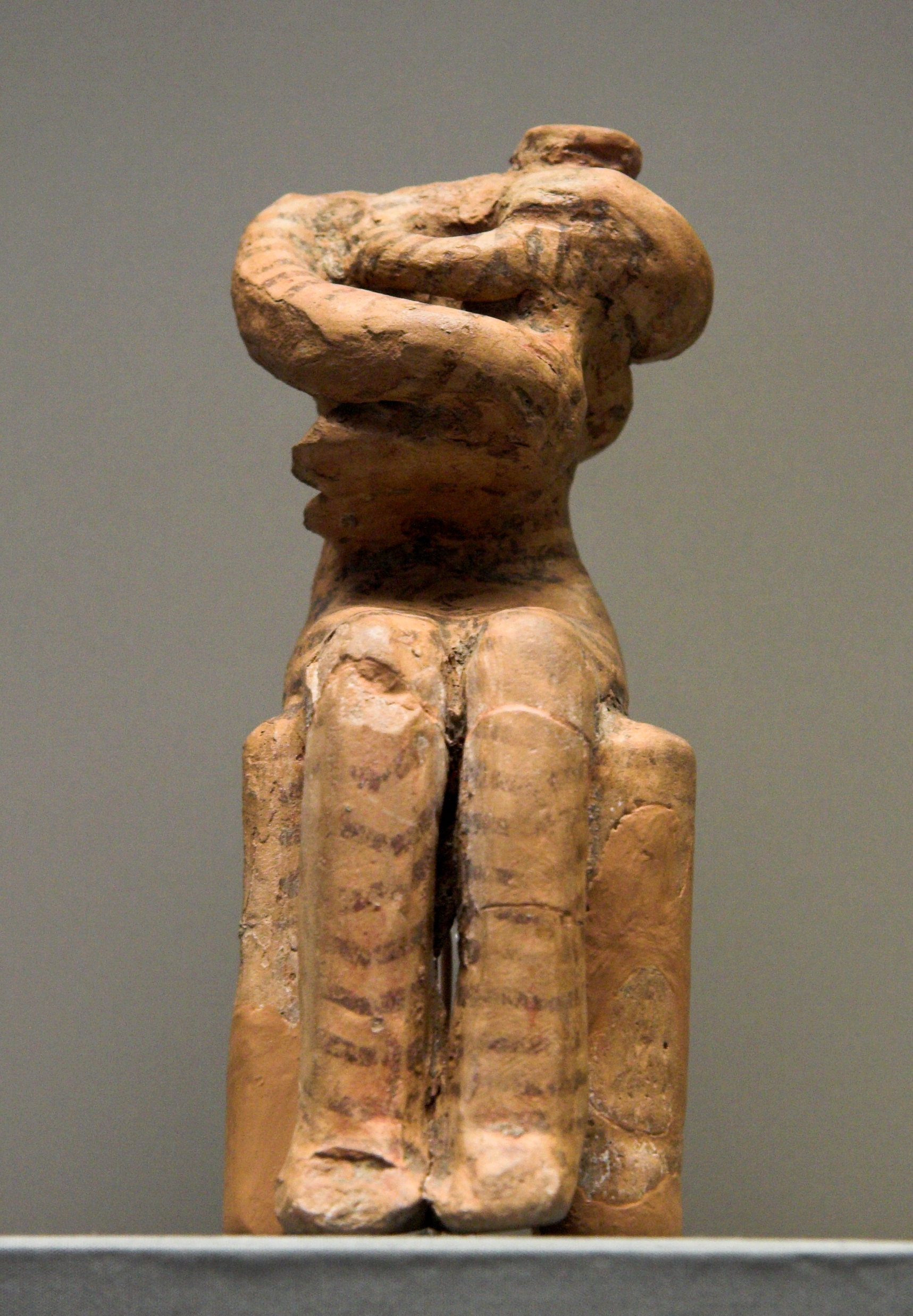
Female figurine of a woman holding a baby, Sesklo, Neolithic, 4800–4500 BC

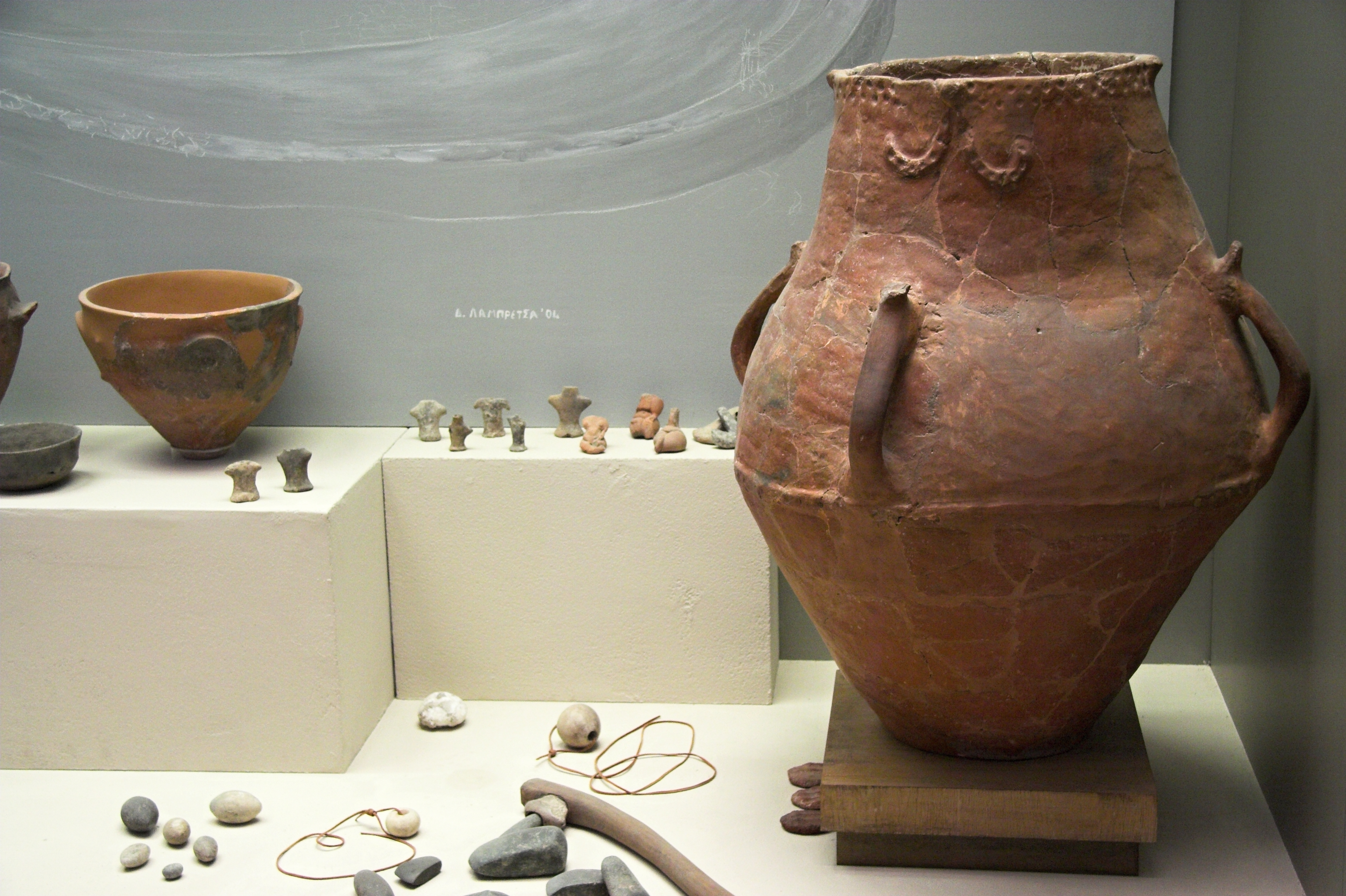
Findings from Sesklo, Neolithic Period, c. 5300 BC

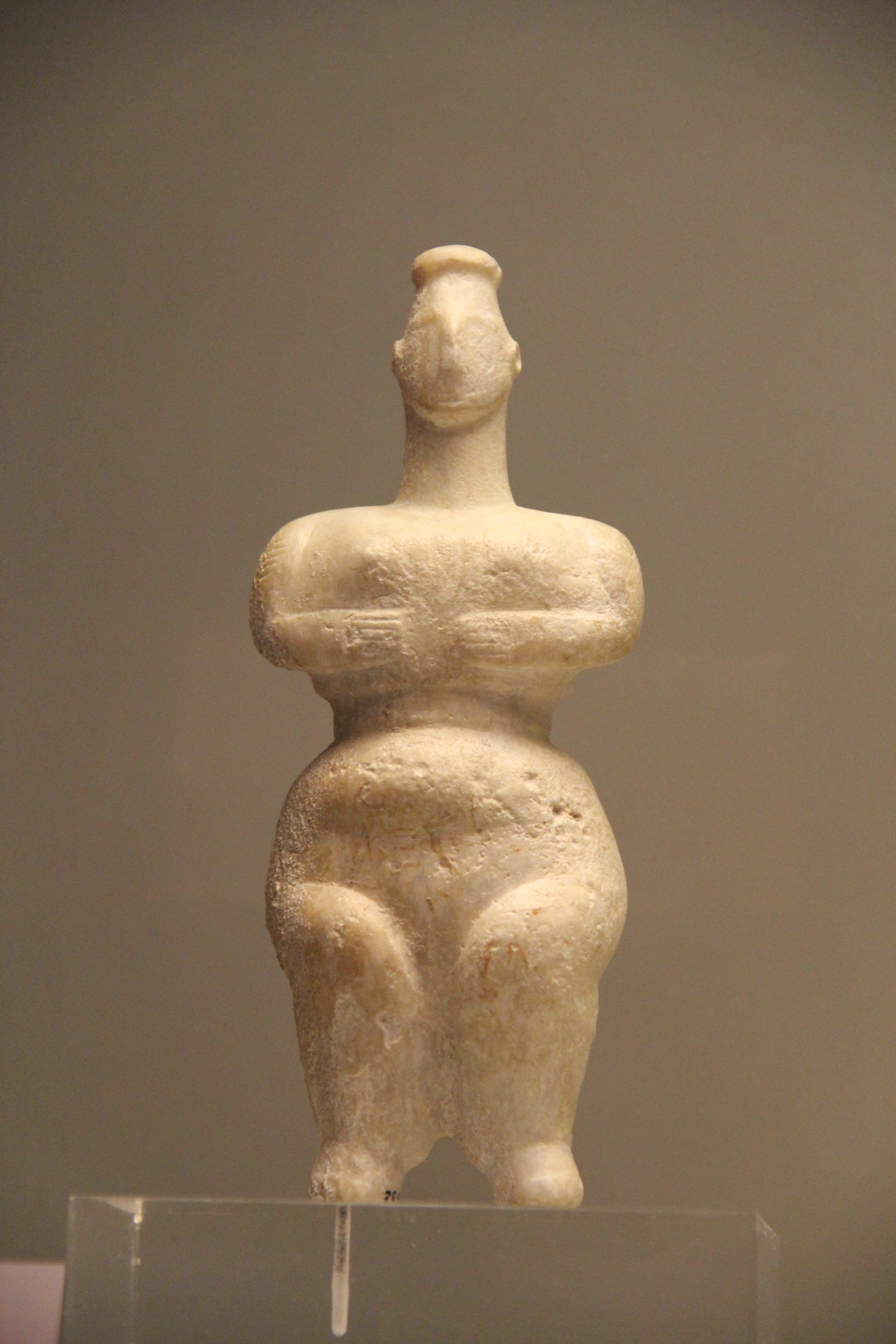
Ancient Greece Neolithic stone figurine, 6500-3300 BC.

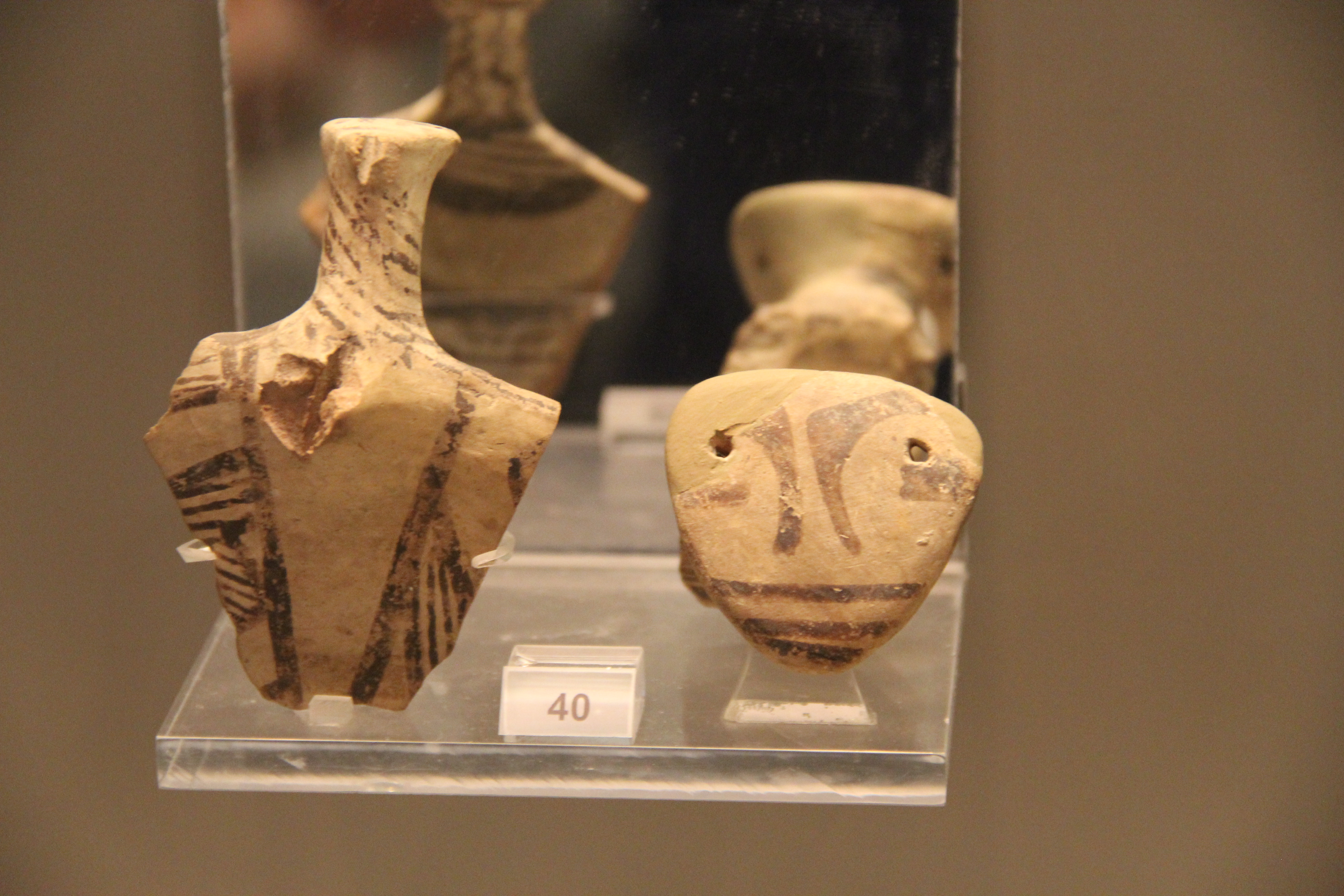
Ancient Greece Neolithic clay figurines, 6500-3300 BC.

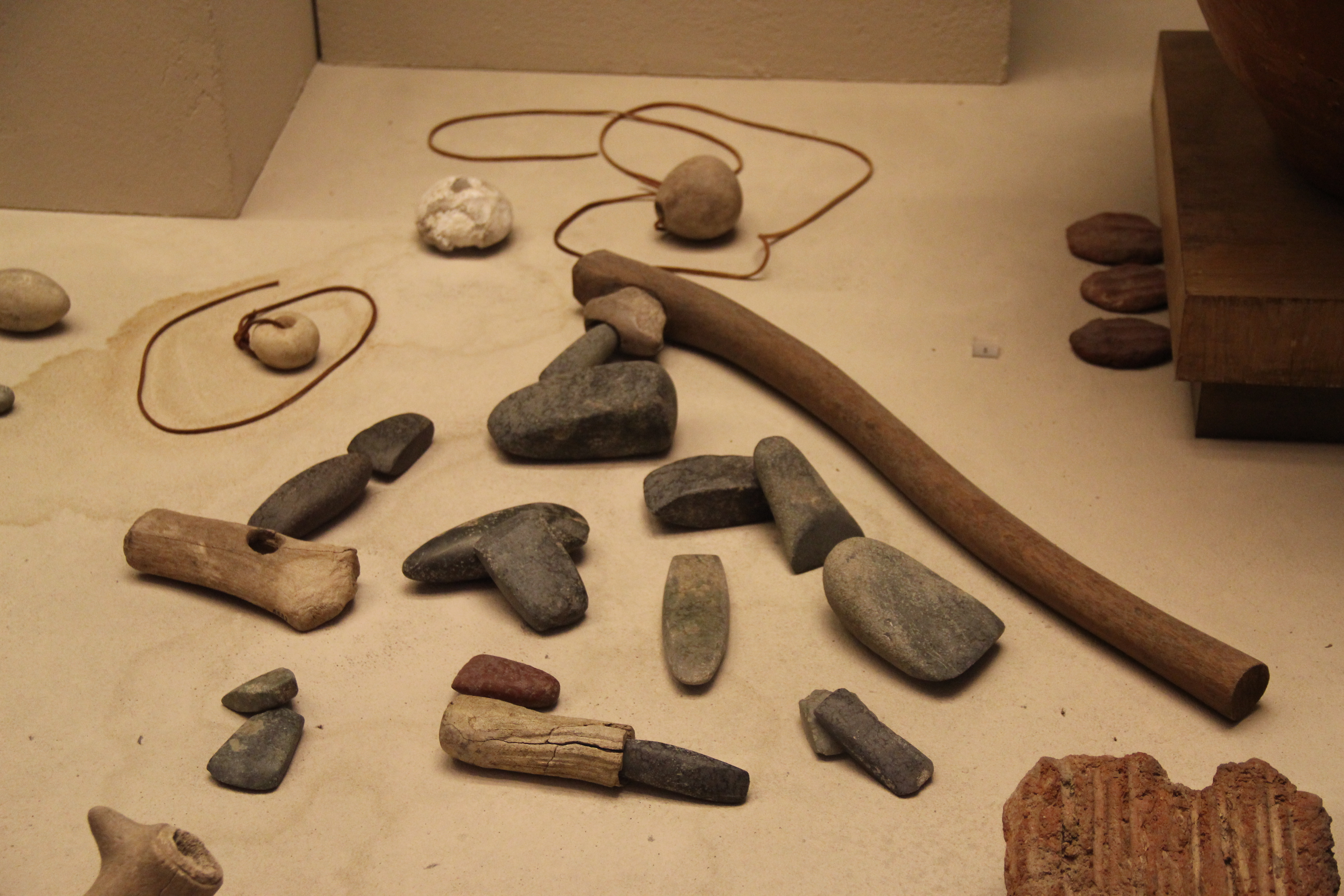
Ancient Greece Neolithic stone tools and weapons.

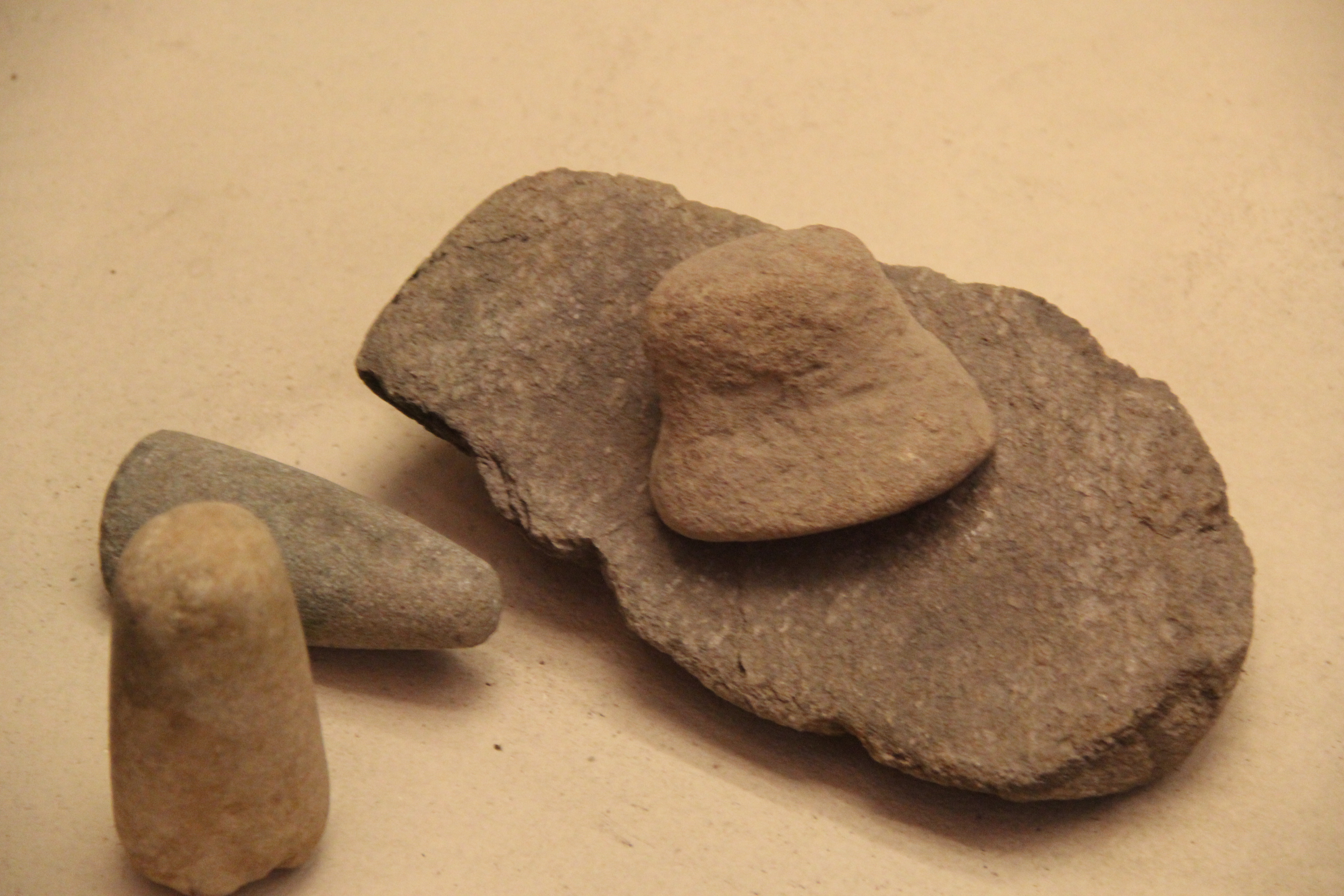
Ancient Greece Neolithic stone grinder.

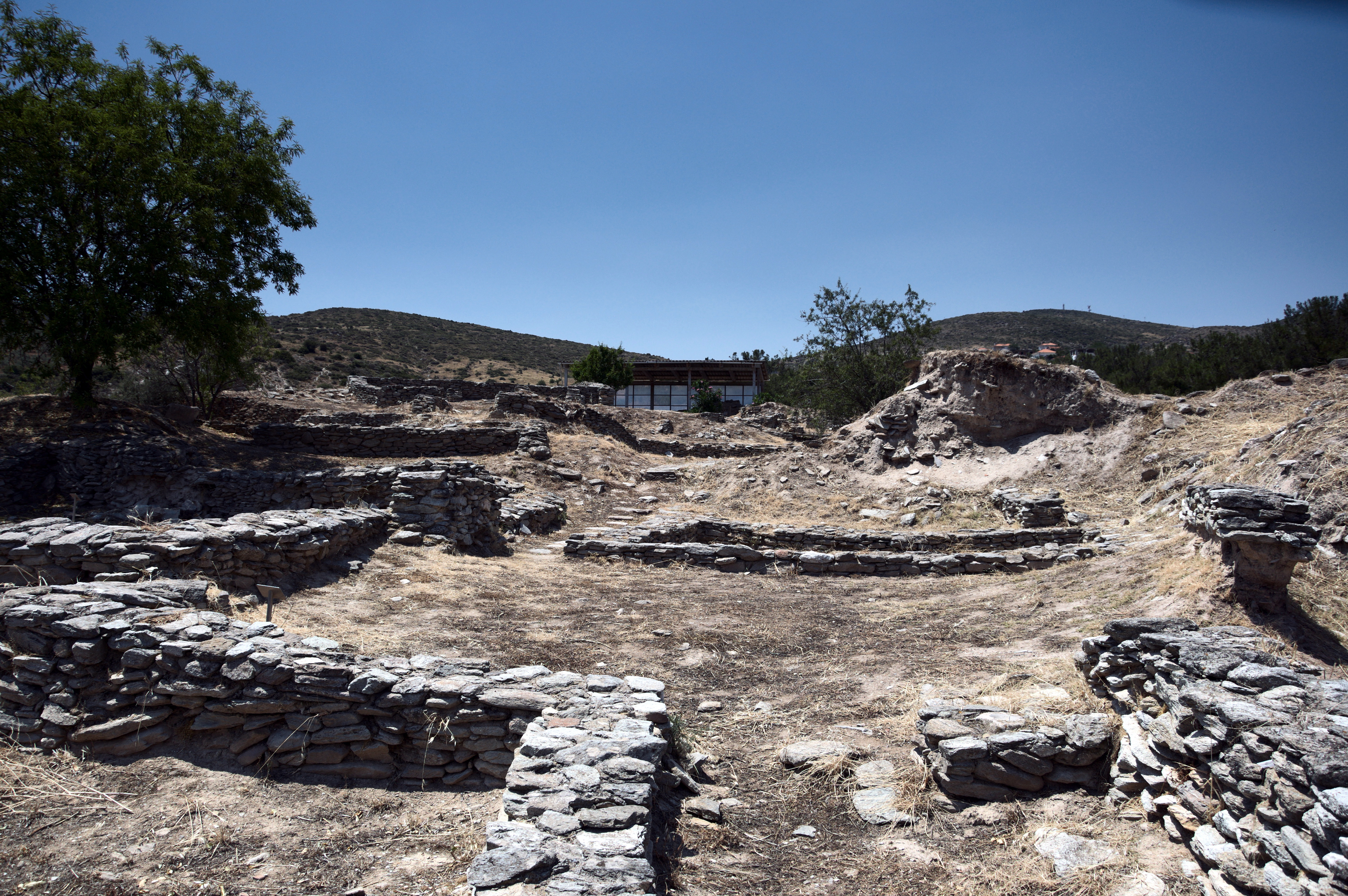
Sesklo stone foundations, c. 5700 BC

== Late Neolithic (LN) 5300-4500 BC ==
=== Late Neolithic I (LNI) ===
The Late Neolithic I period (or LNI) is characterized by settlement expansion and the intensification of the farming economy where shrubs and wooded areas were cleared in order to secure grazing fields and arable lands. During this period, new crops were cultivated such as bread wheat, rye, millet and oat (food was prepared in hearths and ovens usually found inside houses). Animals such as sheep and goats were raised for their wool, which was used to weave garments. Communities were inhabited by 100–300 individuals socially organized into nuclear families and settlements consisted of large megaron-type rectangular structures with timber-post frames and stone foundations. Many settlements were surrounded by ditches 1.5–3.5 meters deep and 4–6 meters wide, which were constructed probably to defend against wild animals and to protect goods by establishing the borders of the settlements themselves.

=== Late Neolithic II (LNII) ===
The Late Neolithic I period was succeeded by the Late Neolithic II period (or LNII) where economic and social life in existing settlements continued uninterruptedly.

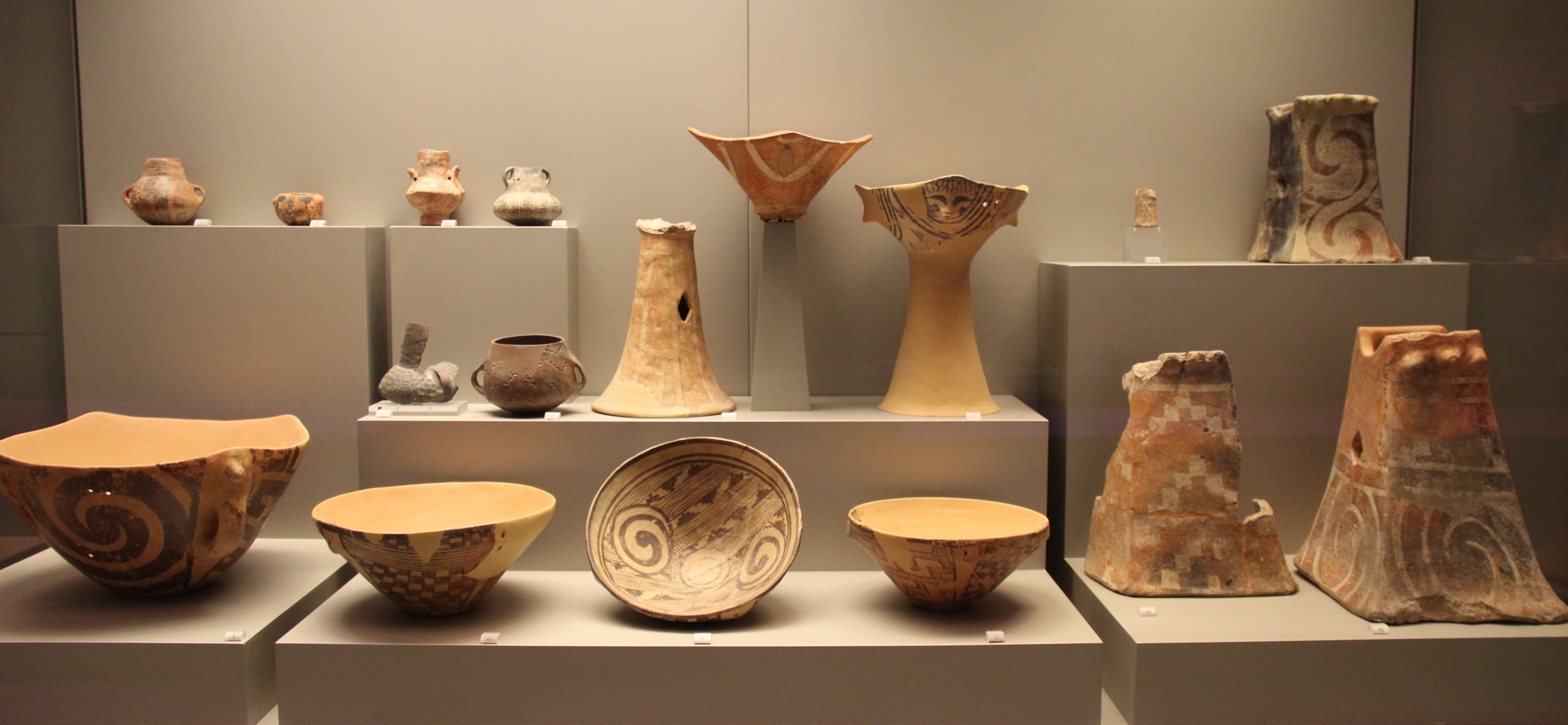
Sesklo and Dimini, Late Neolithic Pottery 5300-4500 BC. Greek Prehistory Gallery, National Museum of Archaeology, Athens, Greece.

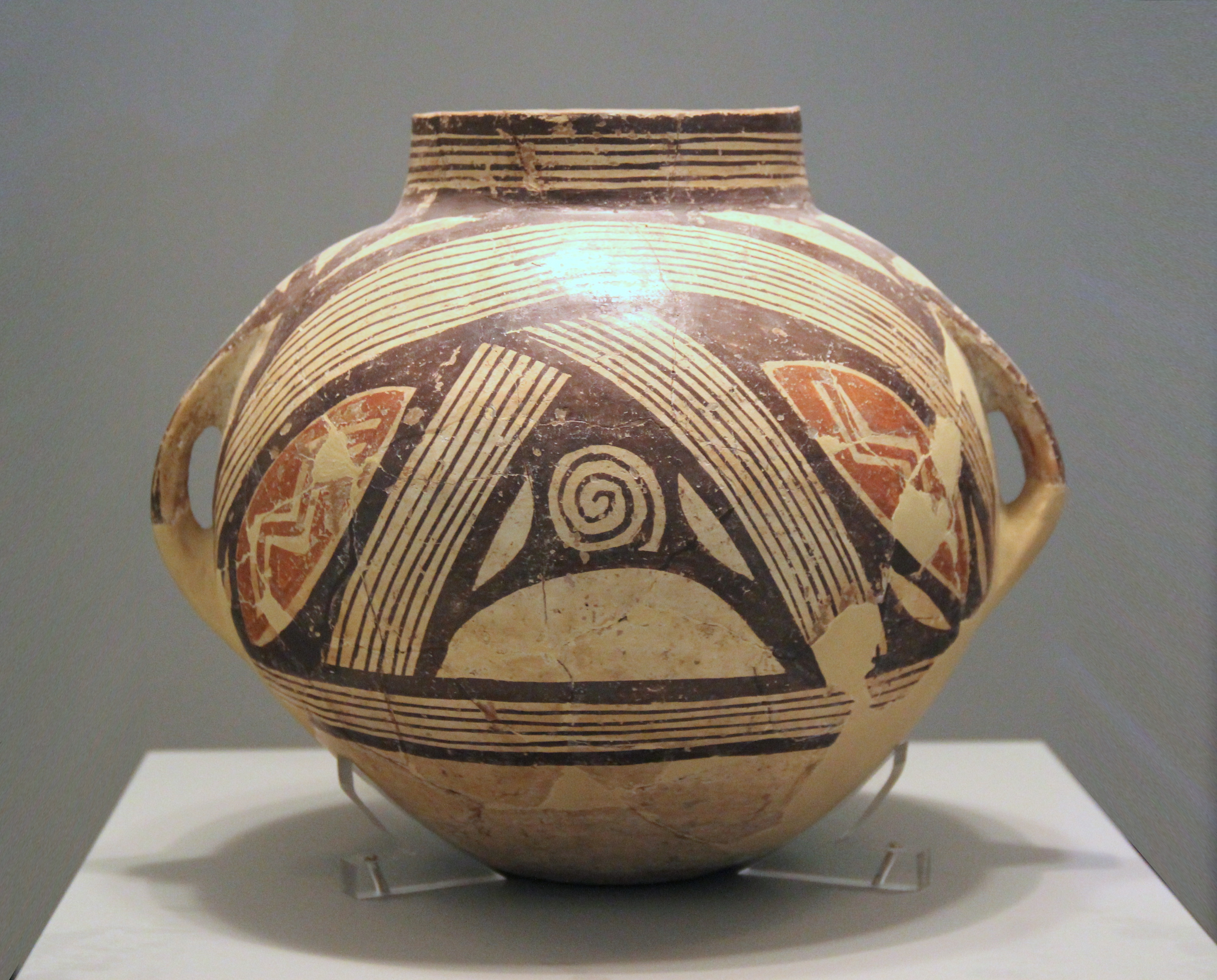
Clay vase with polychrome decoration, Dimini, Magnesia, Late or Final Neolithic (5300-3300 BC). Ceramic; height: 25 cm (9 3/4 in.), diameter at rim: 12 cm (4 3/4 in.); National Archaeological Museum (Athens).

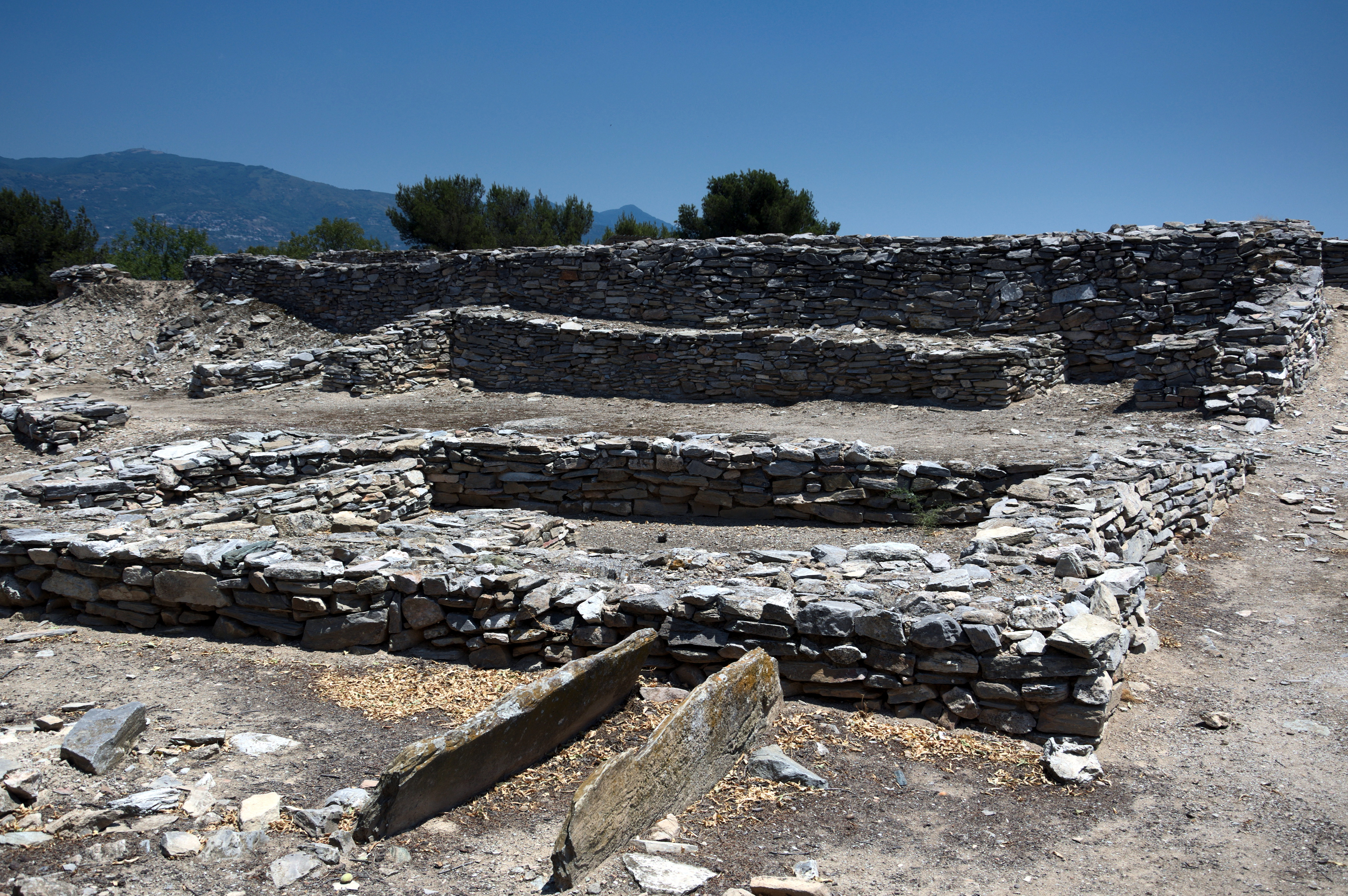
Stone wall remains at Dimini, c. 4800-4500 BC

== Final Neolithic (FN) 4500–3200 BC ==
The Final Neolithic (or Chalcolithic) period entails the transition from the Neolithic farming and stock-rearing economy to the metal-based economy of the Early Bronze Age. This transition occurred gradually when Greece's agricultural population began to import bronze and copper and used basic bronze-working techniques first developed in Asia Minor with which they had cultural contacts.

The Alimia and Rhodes islands had Neolithic settlements. Specifically in Alimia the settlement was on a mountain in the center of the island, which provided perfect view of the entire local area and protection. Ruins of Neolithic stone buildings were revealed during archeological research.

Eutresis culture developed during the ending period of the Final Neolithic. It was based on the Final Neolithic culture of central and southern Greece. It lasted until the Early Helladic II.

=== Society ===
The social classes of the late Neolithic communities were strictly distinguished into free men and slaves; a phenomenon that continued until the early Mycenaean period. Neolithic communities in Greece were patrilineal and patrilocal.

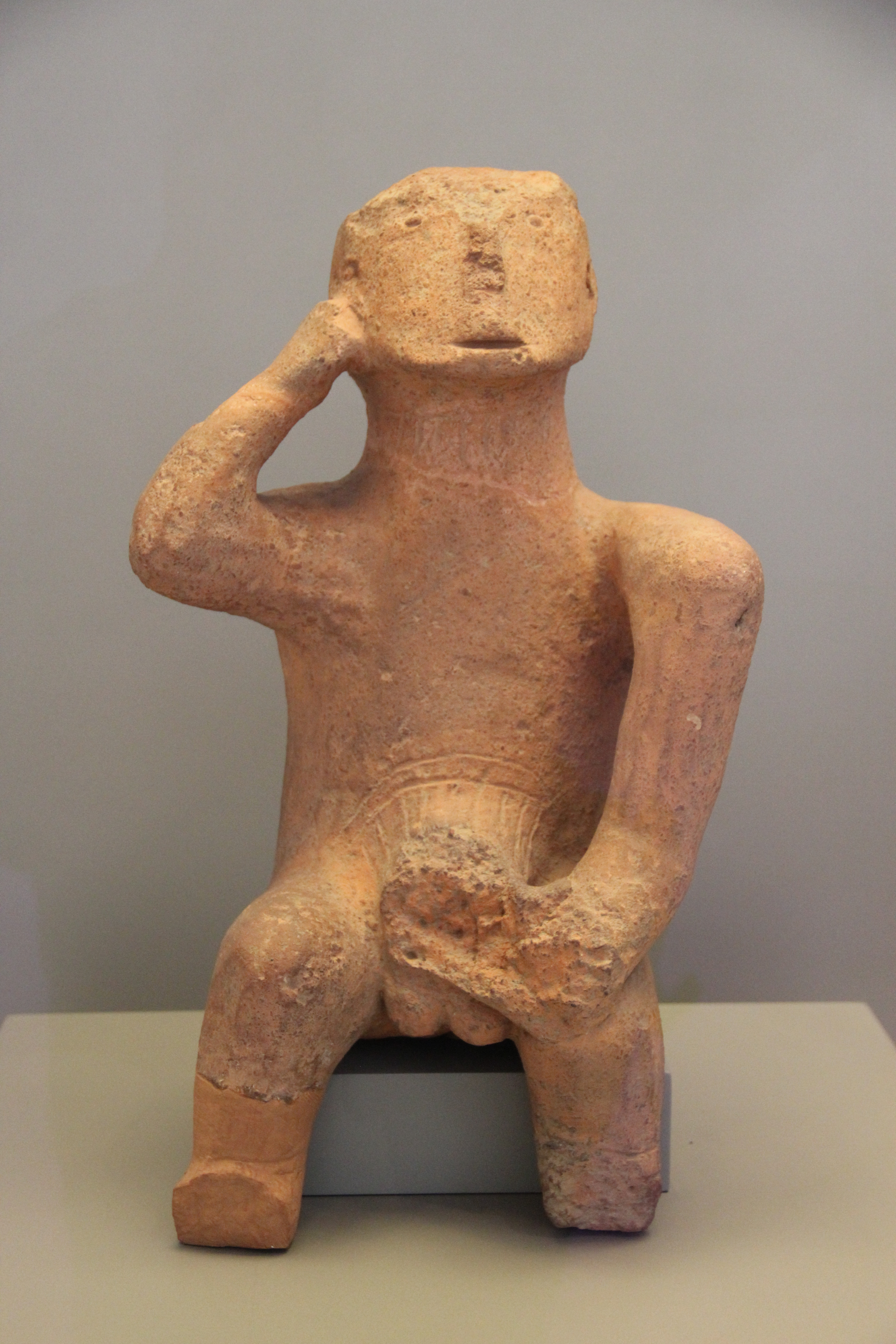
Figurine of the Karditsa Thinker, Thessaly, 4500-3300 BC

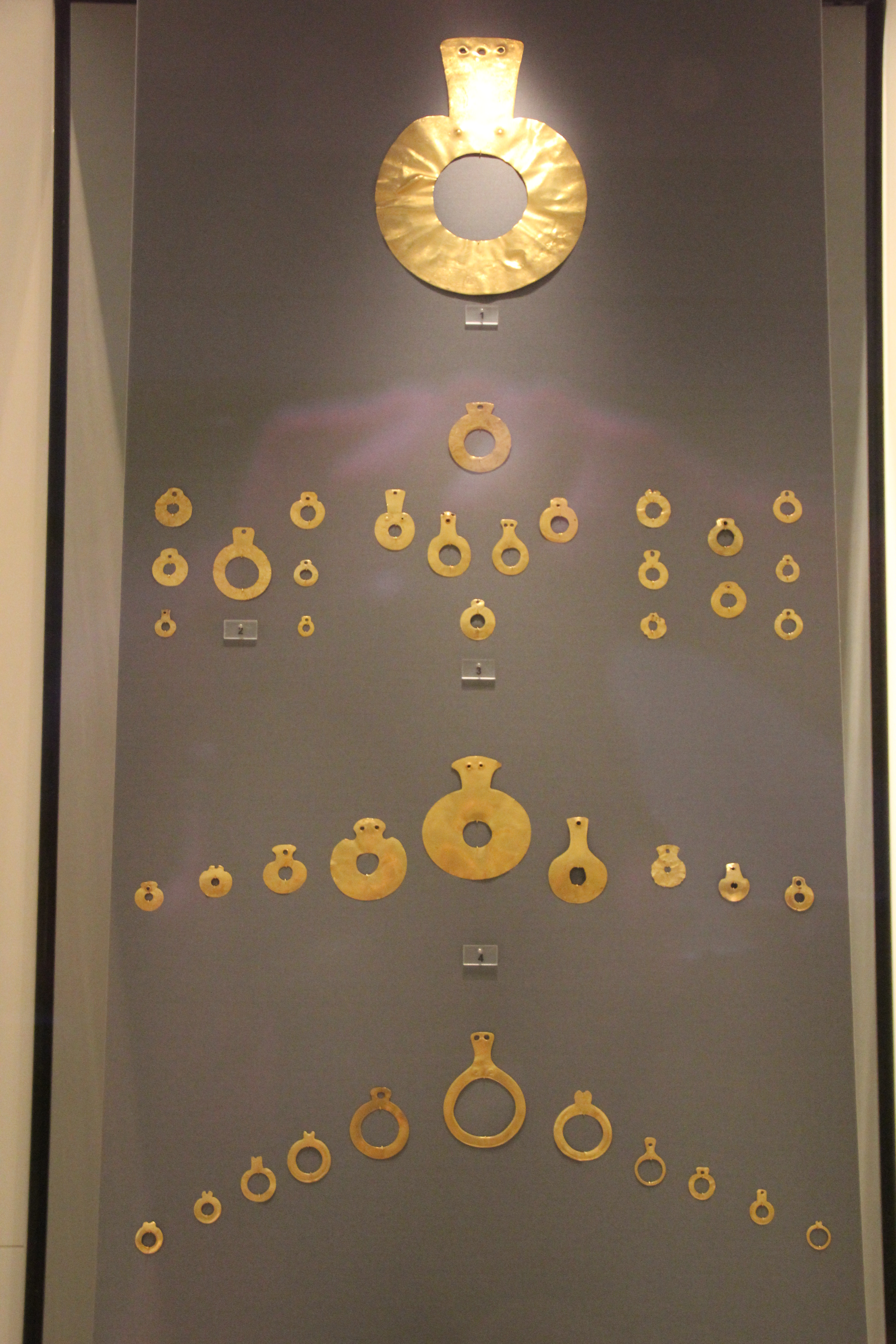
Gold ornaments

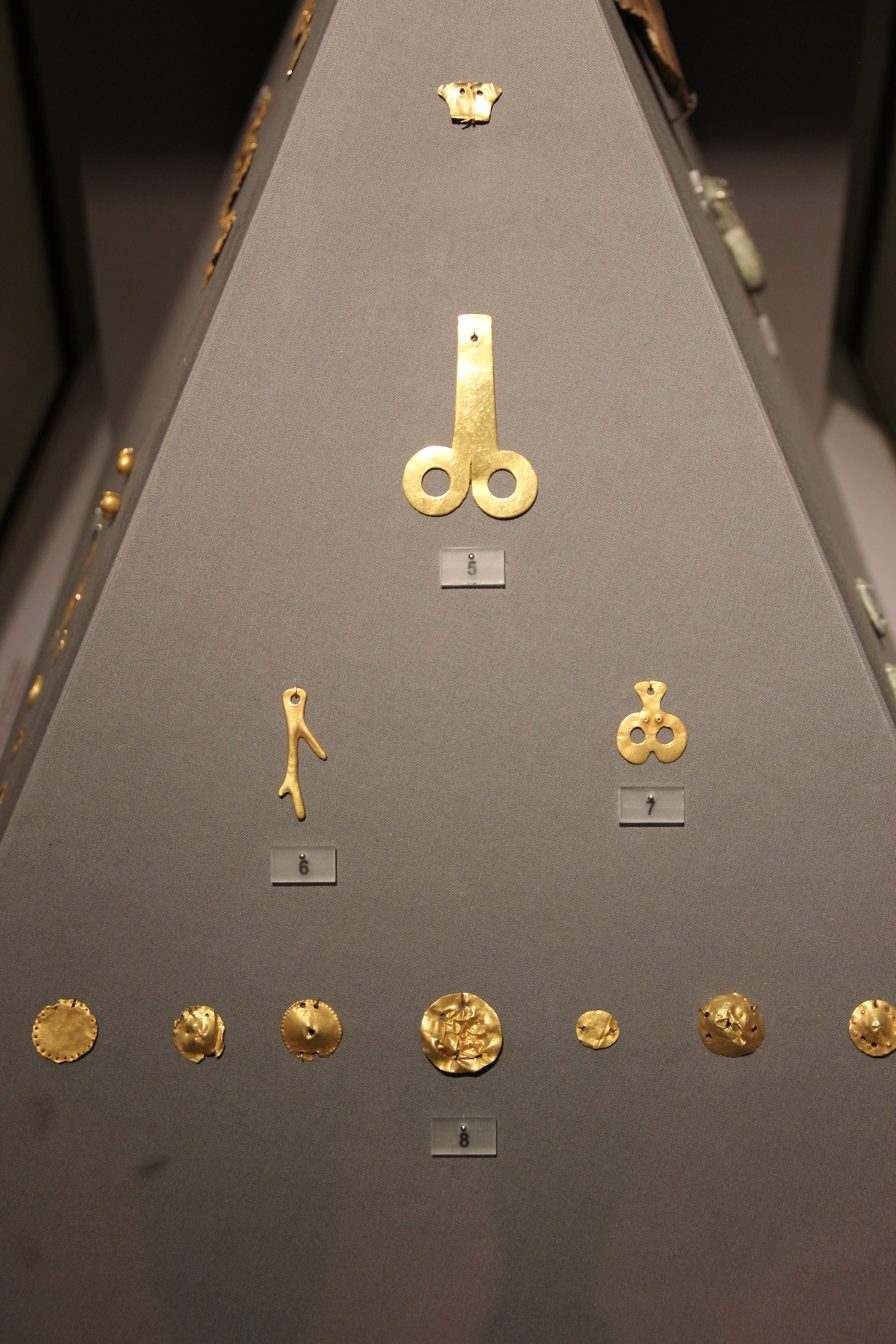
Gold ornaments

== Warfare in Neolithic Greece ==
=== Destruction of Sesklo ===
The remains of Sesklo indicate fire and destruction, a sign of armed conflict. Dimini is often blamed for the destruction of Sesklo but other causes might be responsible for the fire in the Neolithic settlement.

=== Skeletal remains ===
The skeletal remains from Alepotrypa cave in southern Greece exhibit levels of trauma that might be related to warfare. The examination of 69 Late and Final Neolithic skeletons revealed that more than 10% of the individuals exhibited healed depressed skull fractures. Anastasia Papathanasiou, Clark Spencer Larsen and Lynette Norr noted that "All fractures are small, circular, and well healed at the time of death, and are found in adult males and females and sub-adults.", namely the appearance of the wounds suggests that the blows were similar regardless of the victim's age or sex. Some individuals show multiple fractures, mostly nonlethal.

=== Fortifications ===
Both Dimini and Sesklo had walls and strongpoints. Similar basic fortifications were common in Neolithic settlements across Greece; a sign of existing dangers and primitive military knowledge. Simple fortifications, which account for the majority of Neolithic sites, included small walls and ditches, or a combination of the two encircling the area (at least partially). The settlement of Nea Nikomedeia had two concentric ditches. Neolithic Makriyalos had two lines of ditches with V-shaped sections; the inner ditch was ~4 meters deep and was strengthened by small stone walls. The most effective fortifications were discovered in Dimini and Sesklo. Sesklo's acropolis was enclosed by 1.5 meter thick wall and gates that were easily defended. Dimini's acropolis had walls with narrow gateways, that were encircling a small compound.

== Genetic studies ==
A 2016 archaeogenetic study, titled "Early farmers from across Europe directly descended from Neolithic Aegeans", studied two Mesolithic samples collected from the site of Theopetra in Greece, and five Neolithic samples from both sides of the Aegean; three of them from the northern Greek mainland (sites of Revenia, Paliambela and Kleitos) and two from northwestern Anatolia (site of Barcın). The study showed that farming was spread in Europe via demic diffusion and not through trans-cultural diffusion to indigenous hunter-gatherers. Also, the early farmers of the Aegean shared a direct genetic link with the Neolithic farmers from across Europe, and all of them ultimately originated from farming communities of western Anatolia. Expansion of these Anatolian farming communities into the Aegean and mainland Greece had likely begun by at least the mid-8th millennium BCE, as the two Mesolithic Greek samples dated between 7,605-6,771 BCE, possessed an mtDNA haplogroup that is observed in Neolithic farmers from across Europe, namely K1c. Furthermore, the mtDNA haplogroups of all five Neolithic samples that were studied also belonged to typical haplogroups of central European Neolithic farmers and modern Europeans, but not of Mesolithic European hunter-gatherers; namely X2b (Revenia), X2m (Barcın), K1a2 (Barcın), J1c1 (Paliambela), and K1a2 (Kleitos). Likewise, the Y-DNA haplogroup of the two Neolithic males was G2a2, a typical lineage among European Neolithic farmers, but not among Mesolithic hunter-gatherers. PCA analysis showed that all five Neolithic Aegean samples tightly clustered with early Neolithic samples from central and southern Europe, which substantiates a migration of early European farmers from the northern Aegean into and across Europe.

Mesolithic and Neolithic samples of the study (Note: –, indicates no genomic data available; *, indicates not applicable.)
Site	Period	Sample Code	Date	Sex	mtDNA	Y-DNA
Theopetra	Mesolithic	Theo5	7,605–7,529 BCE	–	K1c	–
Theopetra	Mesolithic	Theo1	7,288–6,771 BCE	–	K1c	–
Revenia	Early Neolithic	Rev5	6,438–6,264 BCE	XX	X2b	*
Barcın	Early Neolithic	Bar31	6,419–6,238 BCE	XY	X2m	G2a2b
Barcın	Early Neolithic	Bar8	6,212–6,030 BCE	XX	K1a2	*
Paliambela	Late Neolithic	Pal7	4,452–4,350 BCE	XX	J1c1	*
Kleitos	Final Neolithic	Klei10	4,230–3,995 BCE	XY	K1a2	G2a2a1b

A 2017 archaeogenetic study, titled "Genetic origins of the Minoans and Mycenaeans", analyzed 10 Minoan and 4 Mycenaean samples, and found that both population groups shared at least 75% of their autosomal ancestry with the Neolithic farmers of western Anatolia and the Aegean, commonly known as Early European Farmers. The study also showed that modern Greeks resemble the Mycenaeans, but with some dilution of the early Neolithic ancestry due to later admixture.

== Gallery ==
Map of the world showing approximate centers of origin of agriculture and its spread in prehistory.

A map showing the Neolithic expansions from the 7th to the 5th millennium BCE, including the Cardium culture in blue.

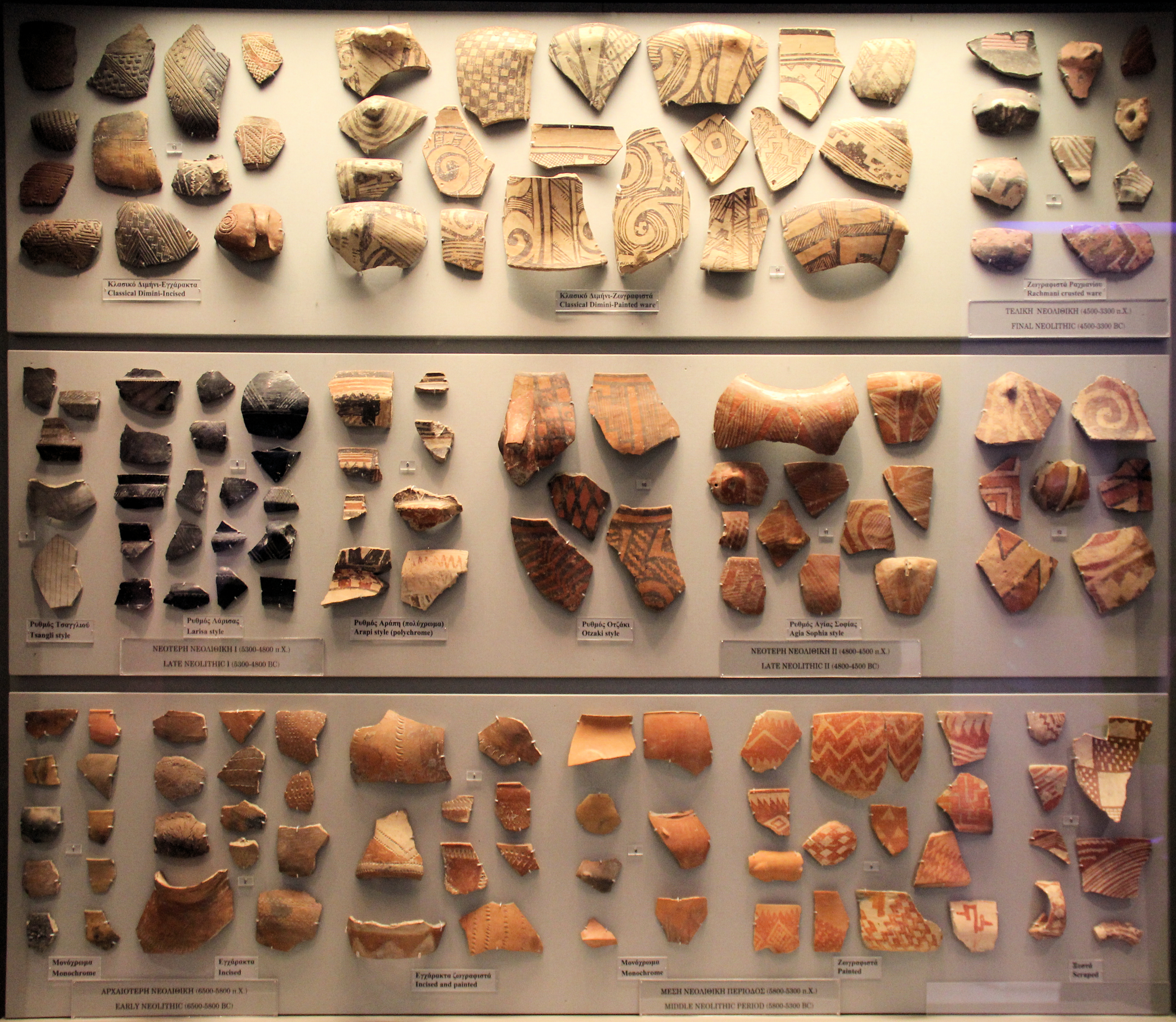
Neolithic pottery styles of Ancient Greece

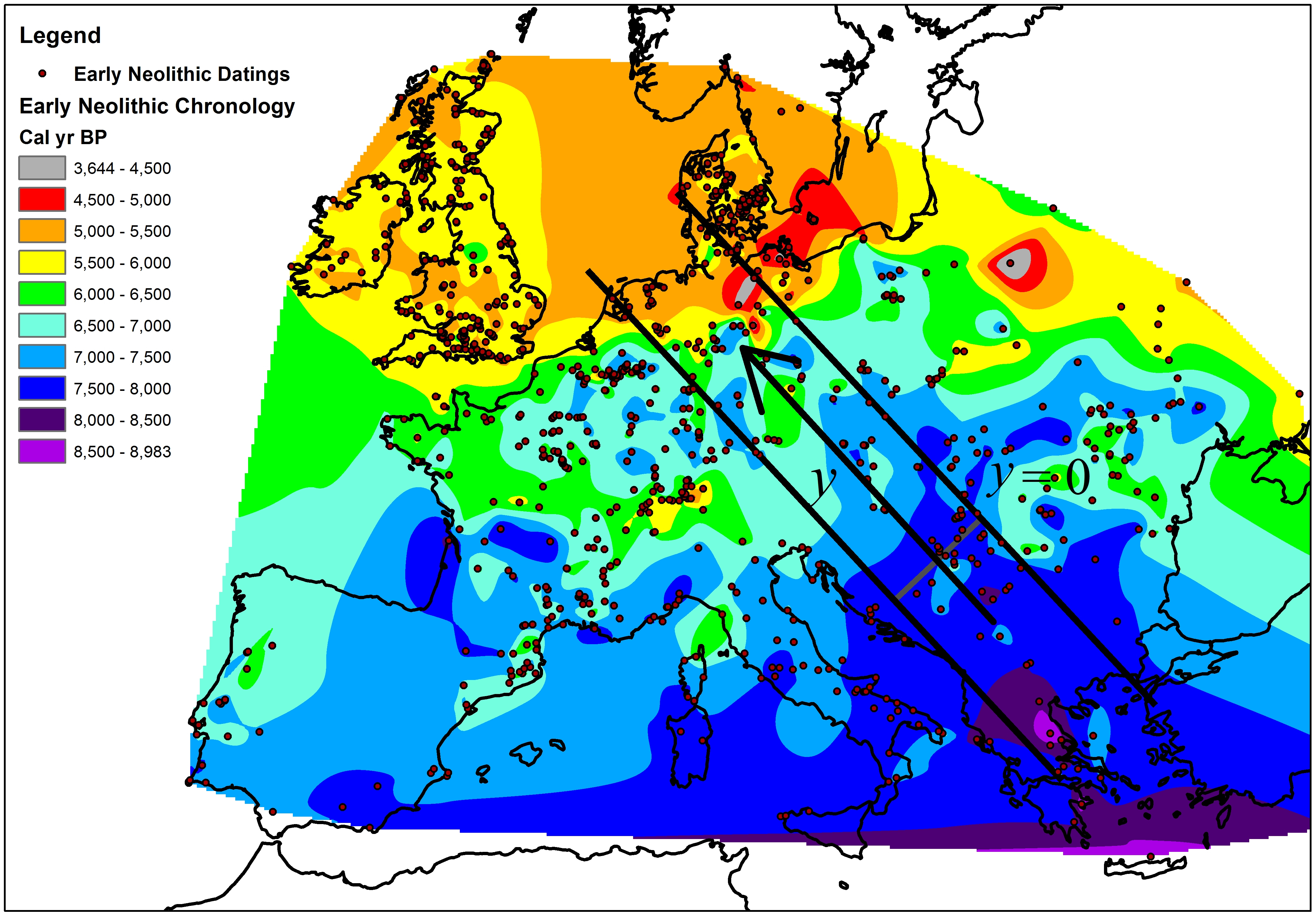
Neolithic expansion in Europe

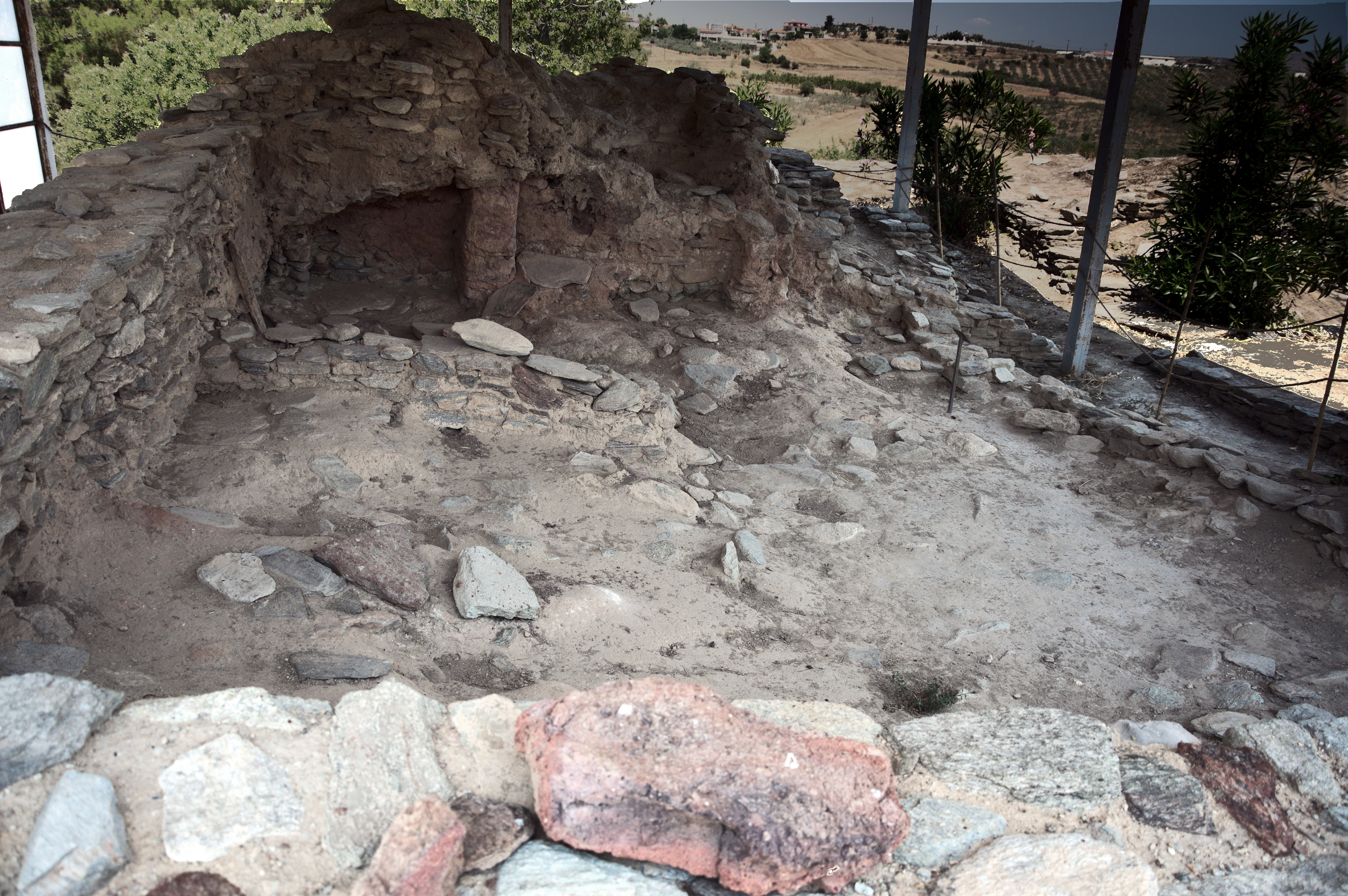
Neolithic settlement of Sesklo in central Greece, one of the most advanced settlements of its era

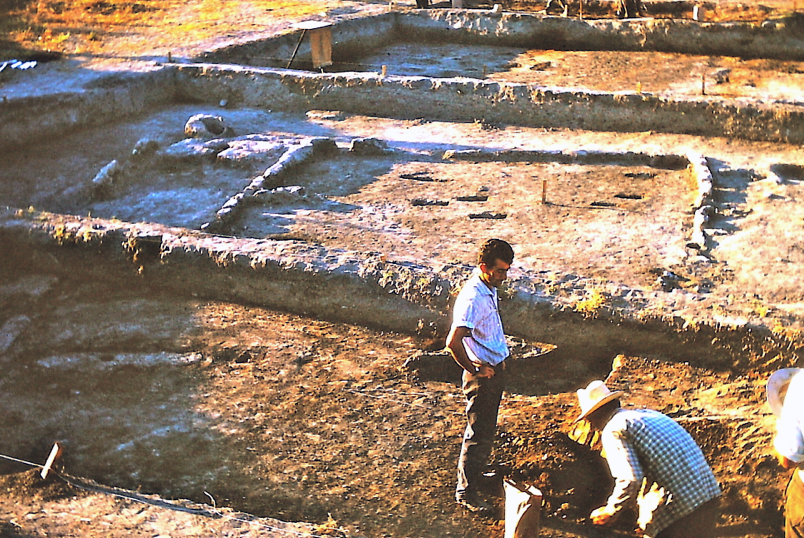
Neolithic settlements of Nea Nikomedeia, close to Krya Vrysi

== See also ==
- Neolithic Europe
- Prehistory of Southeastern Europe
- Neolithic Crete
- Pelasgians
- Asphendou Cave petroglyphs
