= Megaron =

Great hall in ancient Greek palace complexes

Schematic plan of a megaron complex. 1: anteroom, 2: hall (main room), 3: columns in portico and hall.

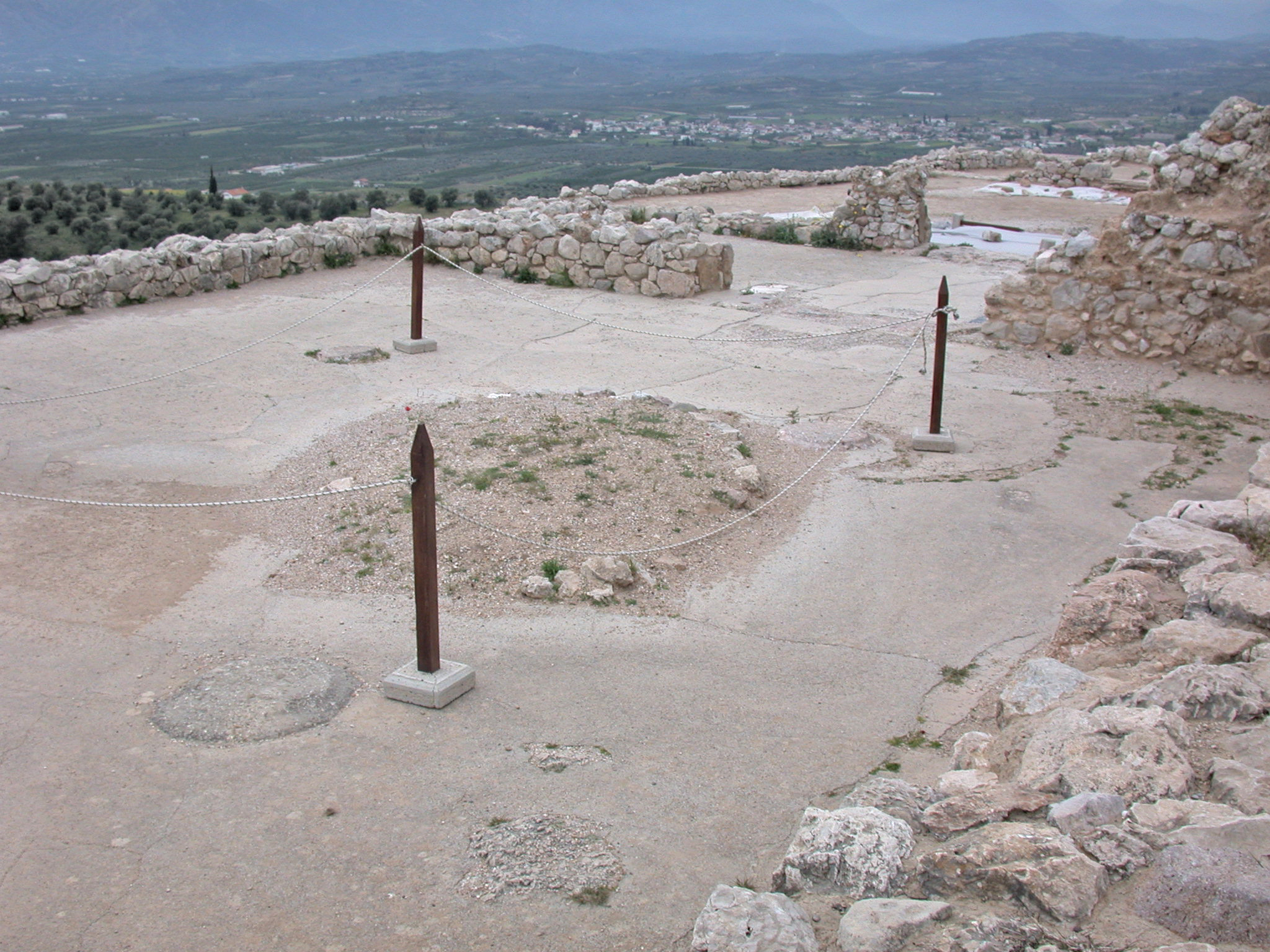
Foundation of the megaron complex at Mycenae, view from the main hall (circular hearth visible in foreground) through the anteroom and porch

The megaron (/ˈmɛɡəˌrɒn/; Ancient Greek: μέγαρον, [méɡaron], pl.: megara /ˈmɛɡərə/) was the great hall in very early Mycenean and ancient Greek palace complexes. Architecturally, it was a rectangular hall that was supported by four columns, fronted by an open, two-columned portico, and had a central, open hearth that vented though an oculus in the roof.

The megaron also contained the throne-room of the wanax, or Mycenaean ruler, whose throne was located in the main room with the central hearth. Similar architecture is found in the Ancient Near East, though the presence of the open portico, generally supported by columns, is particular to the Aegean. Megara are sometimes referred to as "long-rooms", as defined by their rectangular (non-square) shape and the position of their entrances, which are always along the shorter wall so that the depth of the space is larger than the width. There were often many rooms around the central megaron, such as archive rooms, offices, oil-press rooms, workshops, potteries, shrines, corridors, armories, and storerooms for such goods as wine, oil, and wheat. Evidence suggests that the megara of ancient Greece were often created using the construction techniques of wattle-and-daub and pisé.

The megaron is thought to have been used for sacrificial processions as well as for royal functions and court meetings. However parts of the megaron functioned as living spaces and were used as residences before the eighth century BC.

== Historical use and purpose ==
Numerous sources indicate that the megaron was used in two central ways: first and foremost it was used for religious ceremonies while also being used to support residents as a dwelling space. Additionally, according to Valentin Müller, there is evidence for 32 different types of megaron throughout Greece and parts of Europe and Russia. Their use varied significantly depending on the time periods and locations in which they were built. Remnants of structures related to the traditional Greek megaron style buildings can be found in Thessaly dating back to the Neolithic Era. Müller asserts that these are some of the first known megaron, classifying them with the designation "Type 1" megarons. These initial structures were somewhat similar in design to those found in Ancient Greece but different in their material and roofing style and complexity. Müller has classified and archived a number of megaron "typings" that existed through the first, second and third periods of history and shows how a number of ethnic groups participated in creating the original and archetypal model, which later evolved into the classical Greek megaron structure.

=== Eventual reworking and the oikos ===
The Greek megaron style building was initially structurally designed to allow for religious ceremonies to be held in the central room of the building, while the other rooms supported residence dwelling. However, during the eighth century BC, the base layout of the megaron evolved into what is understood to be the traditional structural design: where the central configuration of the building became more strictly associated with worship. The inhabited sections of the structure grew as a subsidiary structure from the traditional megaron design, and became what was later known as an oikos in ancient Greece.

== Structure ==
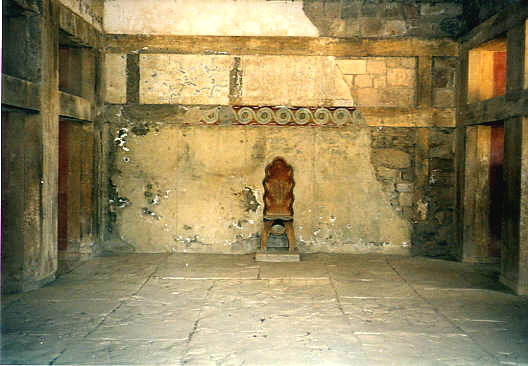
Throne room of a megaron in Knossos, Greece

Rectilinear halls were a characteristic theme of ancient Greek architecture. The Mycenaean megaron originated and evolved from the megaroid, or large hall-centered rectangular building, of mainland Greece dating back to the Late Neolithic and Early Bronze Age. Furthermore, it served as the architectural precursor to the Greek temples of the Archaic and Classical periods. With respect to its structural layout, the megaron includes a columned entrance, a pronaos and a central naos ("cella") with early versions of it having one of many roof types (i.e., pitched, flat, barrel). The roof, specifically, was supported by wooden beams and since the aforesaid roof types are always destroyed in the remnants of the early megaron, the definite roof type is unknown. The floor was made of patterned concrete and covered in carpet. The walls, constructed out of mudbrick, were decorated with fresco paintings. There were wood-ornamented metal doors, often two-leaved, and footbaths were also used in the megaron as attested in Homer's Odyssey where Odysseus's feet were washed by Eurycleia. The proportions involving a larger length than width are similar structurally to early Doric temples.

== Construction techniques ==
=== Wattle-and-Daub and Pisé ===
The construction of the megaron style structure differs depending on the location and the specific example. Recent excavations of the small town of Karataş, Turkey, has led to the discovery of structural evidence that survived the ages, allowing archeologists and scholars to piece together theories as to how they were created. Some of the most prominent theories to come from this unearthing are the "Wattle-and-Daub" and "Pisé" construction techniques. In the ancient remains of the Karataş houses, archeologists analyzed the surviving foundations and walls of the megaron framework and observed that within each brick foundation were tightly packed tree saplings. The mudbrick surrounding these saplings provided for a dense and well taught structural foundation in which the megaron could be assembled. In other instances, the inner wood-work of the foundation was held in place with soil and rock, rather than mudbrick. Archeologist are unsure whether to call this a pure "Wattle-and-Daub" technique, or rather Pisé, as there is no indication that the inner saplings were woven together in order to help keep the wall's shape, or if the walls were rather held together by the surrounding mud, as done in typical Pisé fashion.

=== Roofing ===
There are a number of different theories about the architectural design of megaron roofing; consequently there is much contention as to what type of roofing was actually used in ancient Greece. Some scholars suggest that the traditional megaron roof was flat, while others, prominently Baldwin Smith and Dinsmoor respectively, believe there is more evidence towards a pitched or gabled design. A lot of these theories have gained popularity and are widely accepted in the effort to reconstruct the ancient megaron; however, some scholars such as Carl W. Blegen have argued that both the arguments presented by the lead supporters for the pitched and gabled roofs (Smith and Dinsmoor) provide insufficient evidence for determining what the actual roofing might have looked like and asserts that more pertinent studies need to be done before any conclusive judgements can be made. As it stands, conceptualization of the megaron style roofing rendered an overall inconclusive understanding among the archeological community and has led to nothing but speculation.

== Examples ==
=== Megaron of Tiryns ===
A famous megaron is in the large reception hall of the king in the Bronze Age palace of Tiryns, the main room of which had a raised throne placed against the right wall and a central hearth bordered by four Minoan-style wooden columns that served as supports for the roof. The Cretan elements in the Tiryns megaron were adopted by the Mycenaeans from the palace type found in Minoan architecture. Frescoes from Pylos show figures eating and drinking, which were important activities in Greek culture. Artistic portrayals of bulls, a common zoomorphic motif in Mycenaean vase painting, appear on Greek megaron frescoes, such as the one in the Pylos megaron, where a bull is depicted at the center of a Mycenaean procession. Other famous megara include the ones at the Mycenaean palaces of Thebes and Mycenae. Different Greek cultures had their own unique megara; for example, the people of the Greek mainland tended to separate their central megaron from the other rooms whereas the Cretans did not do this.

=== Megaron of Mycenae ===
Notable information about the megaron of Mycenae has been reported by archeologist Hugh Plommer on his findings of a fully intact carved block from the megaron of Mycenae. His publication notes specific in situ measurements, photographs, physical details and descriptions of the stone left behind, along with a brief history of what had happened to the digging site, and even a supposition of the block's use – possibly the remnants of a fallen abacus from the porch of the megaron. The carved fragment of the megaron which he recovered was reportedly "broken into more than forty fragments", and was made from what he assumed to be a sort of reddish sandstone. This archeological fragment is particularly revealing of the history of the megaron of Mycenae, as much of the stone was also reportedly blackened around its edges, indicating that at some point there was a fire which raged through the building. After much archeological analysis, Plommer concluded that the abacus of the megaron was likely "80 cm" in both length and width, creating a solid square base linking the roof to the supporting pillar.

=== Müller's megaron types ===
One source written by Valentin Müller claims that there are 32 recorded types of megaron found throughout Greece and parts of Europe. These structures are understood as variations of the Greek megaron style building, as they are similarly defined by their design as a "long room" where two parallel walls of the structure are equal in length to each other, and longer than the other two walls. Refer to "Fig 1 – Types of Megera with Dates" for a full list of megaron types as determined by Müller.

== See also ==
- Ancient Greek architecture
- List of ancient Greek and Roman roofs

== Bibliography ==
1. Blegen, Carl W. (1945). "The Roof of the Mycenaean Megaron". American Journal of Archaeology. 49 (1): 35–44. doi:10.2307/499938. JSTOR 499938. S2CID 245275098.
2. Coucouzeli, Alexandra (2007). "From megaron to oikos at Zagora". British School at Athens Studies. 15: 169–170. JSTOR 40960585.
3. Dinsmoor, William Bell (1 July 1942). "Notes on Megaron Roofs". American Journal of Archaeology. 46 (3): 370–372. doi:10.2307/499777. JSTOR 499777. S2CID 192984693.
4. Knox, Mary O. (1973). "Megarons and ΜΕΓΑΡΑ: Homer and Archaeology". The Classical Quarterly. 23 (1): 1–21. doi:10.1017/S0009838800036429. JSTOR 638119. S2CID 170046576.
5. Cosmopoulos, Michael B. (1 July 2014). "Cult, Continuity, and Social Memory: Mycenaean Eleusis and the Transition to the Early Iron Age". American Journal of Archaeology. 118 (3): 401–427. doi:10.3764/aja.118.3.0401. S2CID 192963948.
6. Muller, Valentin (1944). "Development of the 'Megaron' in Prehistoric Greece". American Journal of Archaeology. 48 (4): 342–348. doi:10.2307/499900. JSTOR 499900. S2CID 245275483.
7. Plommer, Hugh (1965). "A Carved Block from the Megaron of Mycenae". The Annual of the British School at Athens. 60: 207–211. doi:10.1017/S0068245400013952. JSTOR 30103155. S2CID 130406443.
8. Smith, E. Baldwin (1942). "The Megaron and Its Roof". American Journal of Archaeology. 46 (1): 99–118. doi:10.2307/499112. JSTOR 499112. S2CID 192949828.
9. Wace, Alan J. B. (November 1951). "Notes on the Homeric House". The Journal of Hellenic Studies. 71: 203–211. doi:10.2307/628203. JSTOR 628203. S2CID 163626816.
10. Warner, Jayne (1979). "The Megaron and Apsidal House in Early Bronze Age Western Anatolia: New Evidence from Karataş". American Journal of Archaeology. 83 (2): 133–147. doi:10.2307/504897. JSTOR 504897. S2CID 192878413.
