= Nea Nikomideia =

Village in Macedonia, Greece

Nea Nikomideia Νέα Νικομήδεια
- Community
- Location within Greece
- Coordinates: 40°35′16″N 22°14′59″E
- Country: Greece
- Administrative region: Central Macedonia
- Regional unit: Imathia
- Municipality: Veroia
- Municipal unit: Apostolos Pavlos

Population (2021)
  - Community: 607
- Time zone: UTC+2 (EET)
  - Summer (DST): UTC+3 (EEST)

Nea Nikomideia (Greek: Νέα Νικομήδεια) is a village approximately 11 kilometres (6.8 mi) to the northeast of Veria in the municipality of Veria, regional unit of Imathia, in the geographic region of Macedonia in northern Greece. It is best known for the nearby Early Neolithic settlement, one of the oldest in Europe.

== Village ==
Originally, the village was named Braniata (Μπρανιάτα) and was settled in 1922 with Greek refugees from Nicomedia in northwestern Asia Minor. It received its present name ("New Nicomedia") in 1953. According to the 2021 census, its population was 607.

== Neolithic settlement ==
The Early Neolithic settlement of Nea Nikomideia is located some 2 km NE of the village itself, at 40°36′15″N 22°15′54″E. It is one of the earliest known sites in Macedonia, dated to 6250–6050 BC, it may have had a population of up to 500 - 700.

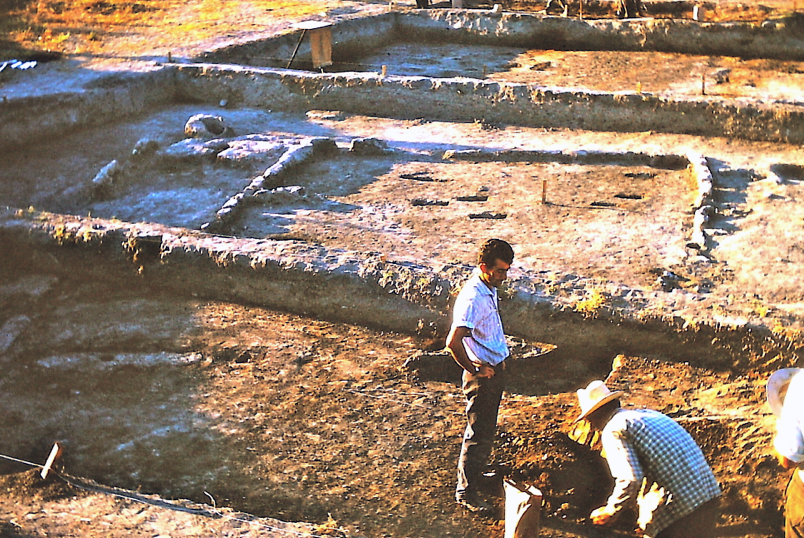
Excavation of an Early Neolithic house at Nea Nikomideia in July 1963

It was excavated extensively in three phases (in 1961, 1963 and 1964) by R. J. Rodden and his team. The site, covering an area of about 1,690 square metres (18,200 sq ft), has square dwellings measuring 12 by 12 metres; the houses at Nea Nikomideia were constructed—as were most structures throughout the Neolithic in northern Greece—of wattle and daub on a timber frame. Items unearthed at the site include "flint blades, stone adzes, clay figurines with cruciform eyes and beak-shaped noses, seals for the adornment of the body, a frog-shaped pendant from steatite as well as clay spindle whorls for spinning wool, and bone tools." Archaeologists excavating the ancient town also discovered clay sculptures of plump women with phallic heads and folded arms. Pottery, especially large vessels, have been found at the site, some as tall as 60 cm and with a capacity as high as 85 litres. The site was originally situated on the shores of the Thermaic Gulf or possibly a lake or lagoon. As recently as the 1930s, the marsh of the Giannitsa Lake covered much of the area.

=== History ===
Nea Nikomideia is the largest excavated Early Neolithic settlement in area, and consists of a mound of 2 metres (6 ft 7 in) height (composed of both natural soil and also debris of habitation). The excavations cover some 1,690 square metres (18,200 sq ft) from a total mound area of about 24,200 square metres (260,000 sq ft). They were carried out by the anthropologist R.J. Rodden and his team in three phases in 1961, 1963 and 1964. The excavations were significant in determining the early European way of life especially in farming and potential links and influences between the Balkans, the Aegean and the Near East, given Macedonia's strategic location as the "gateway to Europe". R.J. Rodden observed that the site was "the oldest dated Neolithic community yet found in Europe" and observed that although it was similar in many respects to the Early Neolithic villages further east, it had "its own exclusively European characteristics." Carbon dating has given a range of 6650 BC to 5530 BC, but mostly between 6190 BC and 6150 BC. Rodden also estimates that the site was abandoned towards the end of the Early Neolithic, possibly due to floods, fire or attacks by neighbouring tribes. It was re-inhabited during the Later Neolithic period.

=== Dwellings ===
Two types of building were identified during the excavations, both reflecting the agricultural and stock-raising vocations of the settlers. In the first phase, the houses were of square shape, measuring 8 metres (26 ft) on each side with wooden columns made of thin tree trunks, spaced at 1.2–1.9 metres (3 ft 11 in – 6 ft 3 in). The walls, built with thin branches and reeds, were plastered over, both externally and internally, with clay mixed with hay. Foundation trenches and holes for fixing posts or columns consisted of clay and were plastered. Flooring was clay mixed with boulders. The roofs, supported on wooden columns, were of the hip type, also covered with clay and hay placed over thatch made of reeds and branches. These huts encircled a central hut of 12 metres (39 ft) square, which was initially thought to be a place of worship, as 12 images were found housed inside the hut. In subsequent stages of the Early Neolithic period, the houses were made in a rectangular plan and with narrow corridors. Kitchen features identified were hearths, ovens, pots, various types of vessels and clay lined pits.

=== Economic activity ===
The economic activity was basically of the subsistence level of farming and livestock. Carbonized botanical and animal remains were found which also indicated the subsistence economic activities practiced by the settlers. The crops grown were cereals and pulses such as naked-six row barley, emmer wheat, lentils, peas, and bitter vetch. Livestock consisted of sheep, goats, cattle, and pigs. Hunting, which was also practiced, included deer, wild boar, tortoises, and birds, and there was also fishing. Wild nuts such as acorns were also gathered.

=== Tools and tackles ===
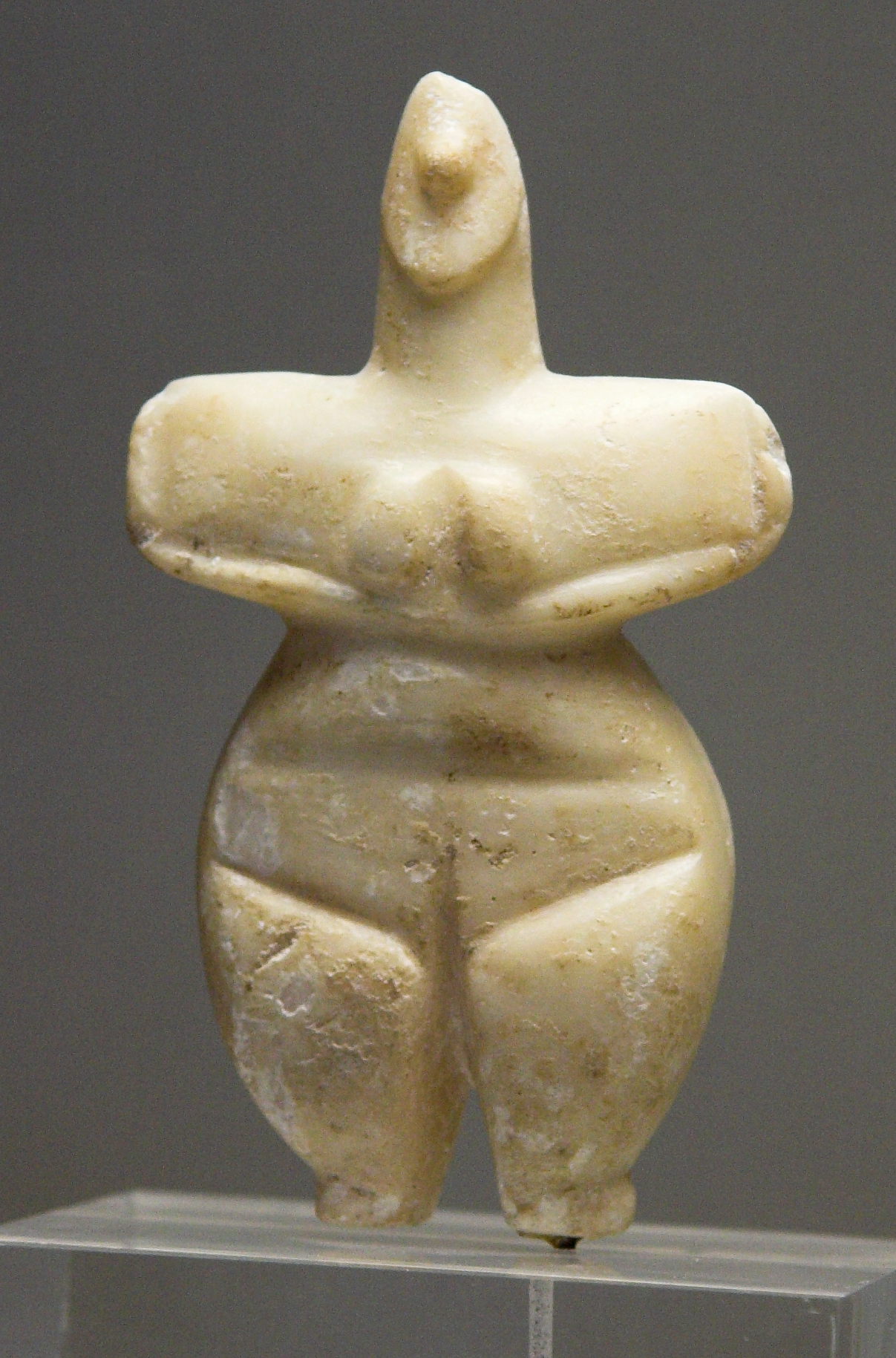
Female figurine, marble, Thessaly, 5300–3300 BC

The tools and tackles found consisted of 118 fragmented and 75 complete ground stone implements, found polished. Some of these are blades made of flint, stone adzes, pestles, pounders, querns, palettes, grinders, spindle whorls made of clay to spin wool, 400 worked pebbles, black and green serpentines and marbles, all indicative of use in wood crafting, animal skinning, grinding to prepare pigments for decorative pottery; there was about a thousand chipped stone items, mainly consisting of blades, flint flakes, chert and quartz. Bone implements or bone tools consisted of awls, points, needles, spatulas and fish hooks. "Sling bullets, particularly with a fairly standardized ovoid or biconical shape with pouted ends and average length of 5–6 centimetres (2.0–2.4 in) were found both baked and unbaked. They are common in Early and Middle Neolithic Greece, southeast Europe, and Near East, and have been found variously interpreted for use as fighting or hunting weapons, shepherd implements, equipment used to determine oven temperature or transfer heat to food and possibly to rooms, counters, gaming pieces and even loom weights."

It is also surmised that the findings at Nea Nikomideia could be for many daily uses and even for production of early period stone artifacts. About 140,000 material pieces were also unearthed from the small excavated area, which included 1,115 vessels indicative of pottery as a major activity with an estimated annual production rate of 25-90 pots.

=== Figurines ===
Images of human figures made of clay and adorned with frog-shaped pendants were found. The eyes of the figures were in a cruciform shape and the nose looked like a beak. The body was beautified with seals and pendants made from steatite. Three green stone frog figurines and anthropomorphic vessels were also part of the findings
