= Semele (disambiguation) =

Semele is the mother of Dionysus in Greek mythology.

Semele may also refer to:

- Semele (play), a lost tragedy by Aeschylus
- Semele (Eccles), an opera by John Eccles
- Semele (Handel), an opera by George Frideric Handel (given as an oratorio in its first run)
- Semele (Schiller), a singspiel libretto by Friedrich Schiller
- Sémélé, an opera by Marin Marais
- Sémélé (Dukas cantata), a cantata by Paul Dukas
- 86 Semele, an asteroid
- Semele (plant), a genus of flowering plants
- Semele (bivalve), a genus of bivalves
- Radford Semele, a village in Warwickshire, England
