= Dracanum =

Coordinates: 37°41′14″N 26°21′43″E

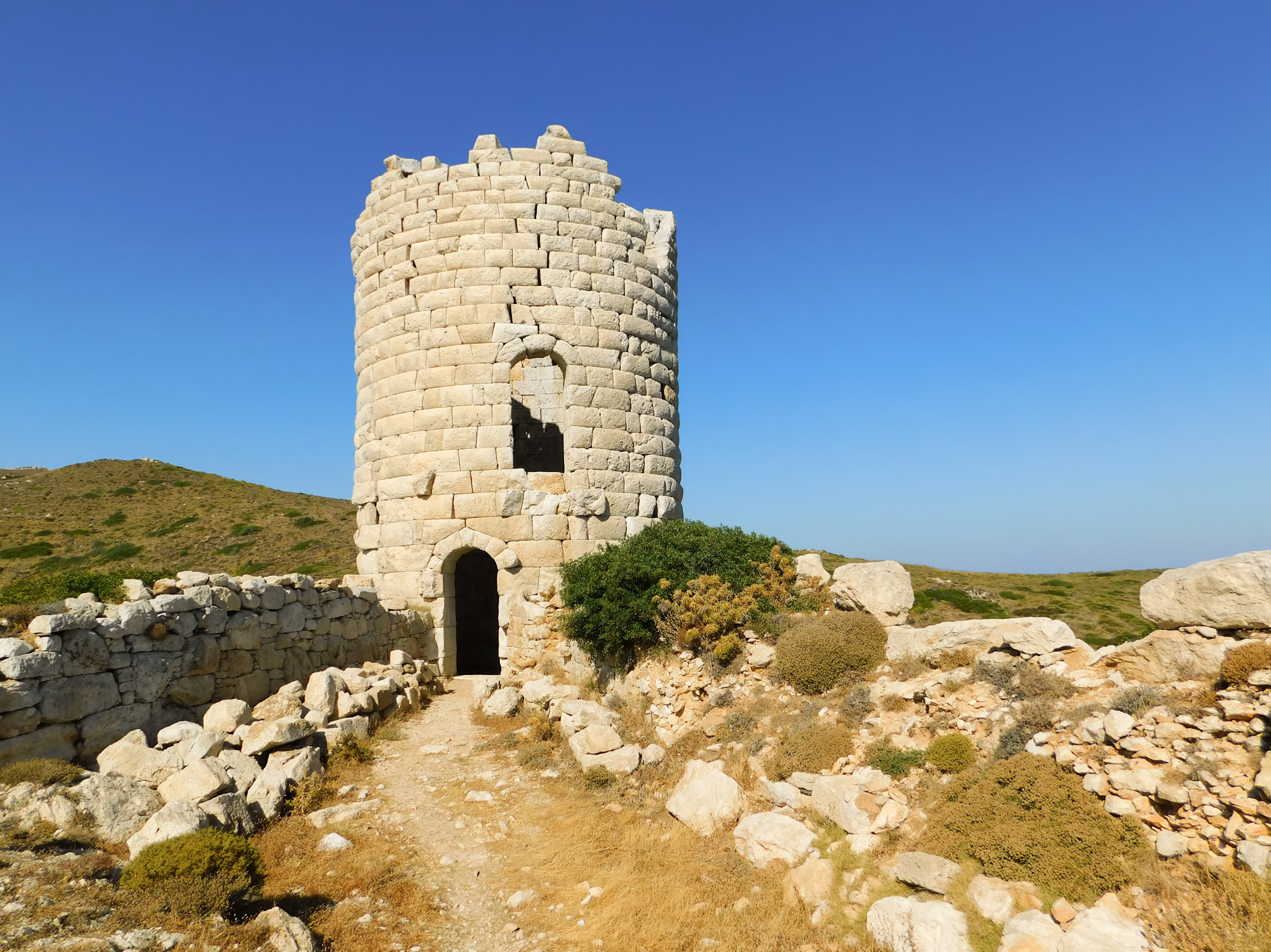

Dracanum or Drakanon (Ancient Greek: Δράκανον) was a town of ancient Greece on the island of Icaria. It was located on the easternmost point of the island, on a cape of the same name.

According to some traditions, Dionysus was born on Cape Dracanum. According to the fragmentary Homeric Hymn, which commences

For some say it was at Drakanon, others on wind-swept Ikaros, and some say on Naxos, Heaven-born, Eiraphiotes, but others by the deep-eddying river Alpheios, that Semele conceived and bore you to Zeus who delights in thunder. And others, lord, say that you were born in Thebes; but they are lying, for the father of men and gods bore you far away from men, hiding you from white-armed Hera. There is a certain Nysa, a very high mountain blooming with forests, far from Phoenike, near the streams of Aigyptos... (Shelmerdine translation)

Its site is located near modern Phanari.
