= Nero in the arts and popular culture =

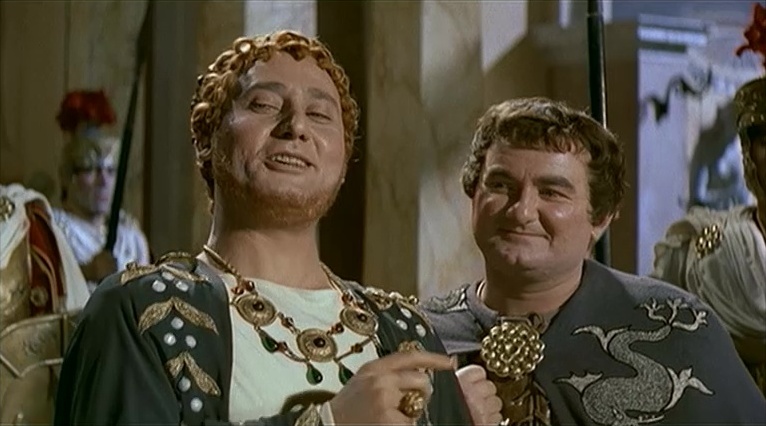
As portrayed by Alberto Sordi in Nero's Mistress (1956)

Nero Claudius Caesar Augustus Germanicus and his reign have featured in music, literature, the arts, and in business.

== Literature ==
- Sienkiewicz, Henryk. 1896. Quo Vadis: The persecutions of Christians in Nero's Rome.
- Kosztolányi, Dezső. 1922. Nero, the Bloody Poet: A novel imagining Nero's crimes as the acts of an envious poet.
- Graves, Robert. 1934. I, Claudius: Nero is depicted prior to the death of his predecessor, Emperor Claudius
- Gyles, Mary Francis. 1947. "Nero Fiddled While Rome Burned." The Classical Journal: explores the history behind the legend of Nero playing the fiddle as Rome burned.
- Wishart, David. 1996. Nero: Nero's reign seen through the eyes of Titus Petronius.
- Massie, Allan. 1999. Nero's Heirs: The death of Nero and the civil war that followed.
- Holt, Tom. 2003. A Song for Nero: Nero's double is killed, and the real Nero must try to survive as a street musician.
- Scott, Manda. 2010. The Emperor's Spy: The story of the Great Fire of Rome, featuring Nero as a secondary character.
- Riordan, Rick. 2016–2020. The Trials of Apollo: Nero and two other evil Roman emperors have survived into modern times because their infamy has essentially made them gods. Nero is known as "the Beast" and serves as the adoptive father of one of the heroes of the series, demigod Meg McCaffrey. Nero is an antagonist in the entire series but is featured most prominently in the first and last books of the pentalogy. In the first book, The Hidden Oracle, Nero tries to destroy the Grove of Dodona and is thwarted by Meg and Apollo. In the final book, The Tower of Nero, Apollo, Meg, and their friends must have a final showdown with Nero and his minions at his headquarters in New York.
- Georges, Margaret. 2017. The Confessions of Young Nero: The story of Nero's rise to power as told by the young emperor himself.
- Georges, Margaret. 2018. The Splendor before the Dark: Continuation of the story to the final years of Nero's reign.

=== Comics/graphic novels ===
- The Adventures of Nero: The title character Nero is named after the Roman emperor. In his debut appearance, the character believes himself to be the emperor himself after drinking poisoned beer. Later he regains his sanity, while all characters keep referring to him as Nero from that moment onwards. In the album De Rode Keizer (The Red Emperor, 1952) Nero travels back in time to Ancient Rome and actually meets the real emperor Nero.
- The Phantom: Nero is said to have been the original owner of The Phantom's "skull ring"

== Art ==
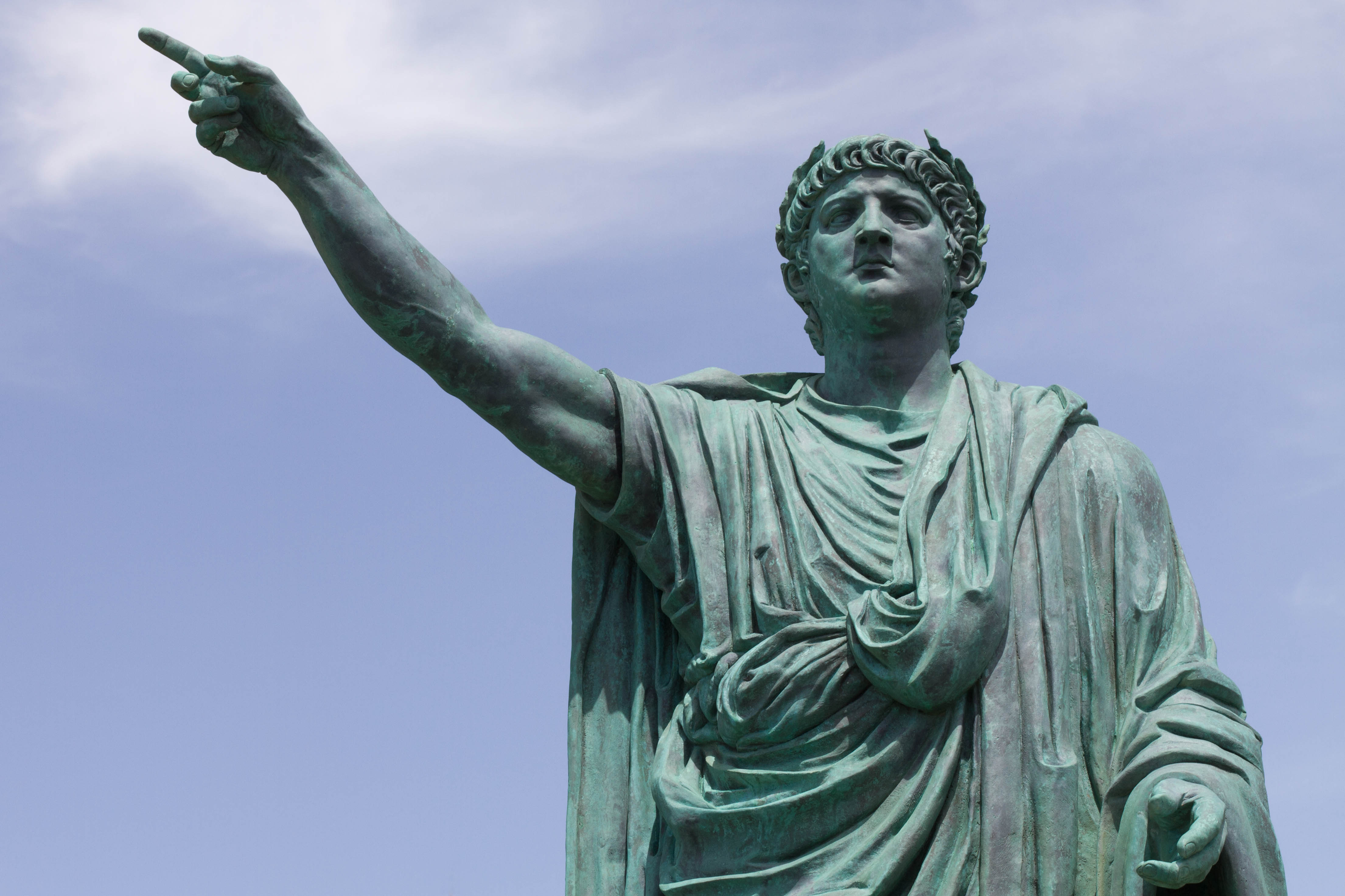
Statue of Nero by Claudio Valenti, Anzio, Italy (2010)

- Salvador Dalí's "Dematerialization Near the Nose of Nero" (1949)
- Henryk Siemiradzki's "A Christian Dirce" (1897)
  - "Nero's Torches" depicts Christians being martyred on Nero's orders (1876)
- John William Waterhouse's "The Remorse of Nero After the Murder of His Mother" (1878)
- In 2010 the municipality of Anzio dedicated a statue of the Emperor (born in Antium) by Claudio Valenti

== Software and video games ==
- Nero AG and its products Nero, Nero Digital, Nero Burning ROM, Nero ShowTime, and features a pictogram of a burning Rome.
- Fate/Extra, Fate/Extella and Fate/Grand Order: A female version of Nero serves as a playable character that the players avatar can interact with. Even through Nero is one of the most internationally famous historical characters portrayed in the game, his fictional, gender-swapped variant present in Fate has become more popular online than her historical original.
- Ryse: Son of Rome: Nero plays as the antagonist. His sons portrayed in the game share no kinship with the real-life emperor and were rather based on real emperors Basil I, Basil II, and Commodus.
- Devil May Cry: Nero is the co-protagonist of Devil May Cry 4 and 5. He is the son of the character half-demon half-human Vergil, as well as the nephew of the series' protagonist Dante, making him grandson of Sparda.
- Days Gone features the National Emergency Response Organisation (N.E.R.O.). The organisation's name as well as its dormancy during the Freaker plague – which is comparable to Nero's own supposed dormancy as Rome burned – is a reference to the Emperor.

== Film ==
- The Sign of the Cross: Charles Laughton as Nero.
- Fiddlers Three: Francis L. Sullivan as Nero.
- Quo Vadis: Peter Ustinov as Nero.
- The Silver Chalice: Jacques Aubuchon as Nero.
- Roman Legion-Hare: Mel Blanc as Nero.
- Nero's Mistress: Alberto Sordi as Nero.
- The Story of Mankind: Peter Lorre as Nero.
- Barabbas: Ivan Triesault as Nero.
- Challenge of the Gladiator: a Nero look-alike fools the Thracians into believing he is the real Emperor.
- See Ya Later Gladiator: Mel Blanc as Nero.
- Star Trek: Eric Bana's character is named Nero; a song on the soundtrack is named "Nero Fiddles, Narada Burns"
- History of the World, Part I Dom DeLuise portrays a humorous version of Nero.
- Nero's Guests (documentary) film by Deepa Bhatia follows the work of journalist P. Sainath in reporting the agrarian crisis in India and draws a comparison between citizens indifferent to the devastation of farmers and Nero's guests at the festivities who continued their enjoyment by the light of human torches.
- PBS: Secrets of the Dead-documentary "The Nero Files - Cause for a Cold Case Investigation?", written and directed by Klaus T. Steindl
- Horrible Histories: The Movie: Craig Roberts as Nero.
- Money Heist (Part 5) Episode 1: The Professor (Money Heist) played by Serio Marquina mentions Nero.

== Music ==
- Bob Dylan's "Desolation Row" references Nero (from the album Highway 61 Revisited)
- Karel Kryl's "Bivoj" references Nero (from Karavana mraků)
- U2's "Mercy" references Nero (from How to Dismantle an Atomic Bomb)
- Bad Religion's "Materialist" references Nero (from The Process of Belief)
- Ulver's "Nemoralia" references Nero (from The Assassination of Julius Caesar)
- Canadian death metal band Ex Deo's album "The Thirteen Years of Nero" chronicles Nero's life.
- The experimental music project Nero's Day at Disneyland references Nero in its name.

== Stage productions ==
=== Opera ===
- Arrigo Boito's Nerone
- George Frideric Handel's Agrippina (and a lost earlier opera called "Nero")
- Pietro Mascagni's Nerone
- Claudio Monteverdi's L'incoronazione di Poppea
- Anton Rubinstein's Néron
- Alessandro Scarlatti's Nerone fatto Cesare (1695)
- Egidio Duni's Nerone (1735)

=== Plays ===
- Anonymous's The Tragedy of Nero (1624) published by Augustine Matthews
- Víctor Balaguer's La Mort de Nerón (1894)
- Wilson Barrett's The Sign of the Cross
- Robert Bridges's Nero: From the Death of Burrus to the Death of Seneca. Comprising the Conspiracy of Piso (1894)
- Pietro Cossa's Nero: A Play in Five Acts (1881)
- Amy Freed's You, Nero (2009)
- Nathaniel Lee's The Tragedy of Nero, Emperour of Rome (1674)
- Stephen Phillips's Nero (1906)
- Jean Racine's Britannicus (1669)
- William Shakespeare's Henry VI, Part 1: Henry references Nero (Act I, Scene 4)
- William Shakespeare's Hamlet: Hamlet references Nero (Act III, Scene 2)
- William Shakespeare's King Lear: Edgar references Nero (Act III, Scene 6), referring to Pausanias' account of the Alcyonian Lake
- William Wetmore Story's Nero: An Historical Play (1872)
- The 1955 musical Damn Yankees features a song titled "Those Were The Good Old Days", in which the Devil laments the days of Nero 'fiddling through those lovely blaze.'
- Enzo Condello's Nero and Seneca 2006.

== Television ==
- The 1965 Doctor Who Serial The Romans (Derek Francis)
- The Time Tunnel episode "The Ghost of Nero" revolves around the ghost of the emperor attempting to kill the descendant of his successor Galba.
- I, Claudius (Christopher Biggins)
- Peter and Paul (Julian Fellowes)
- Nero (Hans Matheson)
- Ancient Rome: The Rise and Fall of an Empire (Michael Sheen)
- Horrible Histories (Jim Howick)
- NCIS: "Rekindled", Gibbs calls arsonist Billy Wayne "Nero" during Wayne's interrogation
- Succession: In "Lion in the Meadow", Tom tells Greg about the story of Nero and Sporus and then tells him he would castrate and marry him. Later in "All the Bells Say", Tom calls Greg "Sporus" as they discuss partnering up in a business deal
- Animaniacs: In "Rome, Sweet Rome", Nero is portrayed by Fred Tatasciore and is depicted as a caricature of Donald Trump.

See also: Nero (Character) imdb.com page
