= Friedrich Tietjen =

German astronomer

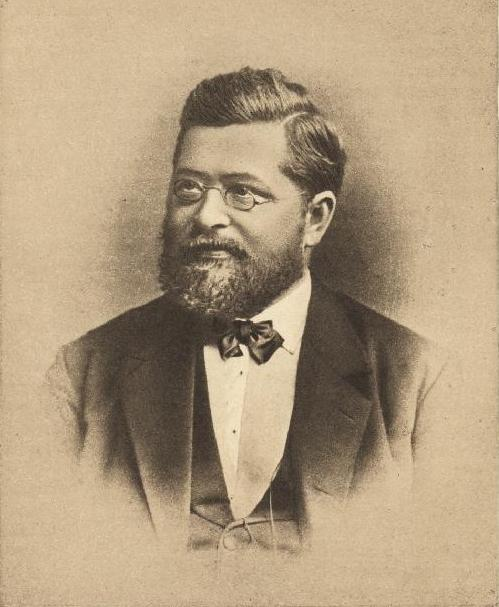
Friedrich Tietjen.

Asteroids discovered: 1
86 Semele	4 January 1866	MPC

Friedrich Tietjen (1832 in Westerstede, Oldenburg – 1895 in Berlin) was a German astronomer.

He was director of the Astronomisches Rechen-Institut (ARI) from 1874 until his death in 1895. The Minor Planet Center credits him with the discovery of one minor planet, the 120-kilometer sized asteroid 86 Semele.

The main-belt asteroid 2158 Tietjen, discovered by Karl Reinmuth at Heidelberg Observatory in 1933, was named in his memory.
