= Sémélé =

1709 opera by Marin Marais

- Opera by Marin Marais
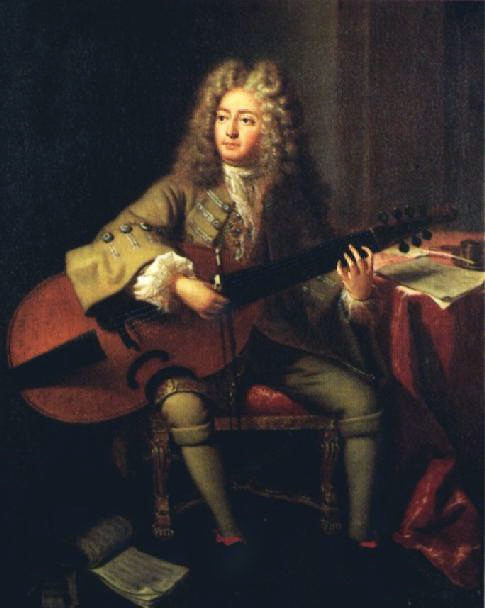
- Portrait of Marin Marais by André Bouys, 1704
- Librettist: Antoine Houdar de la Motte
- Language: French
- Based on: Myth of Semele, recounted in Ovid's Metamorphoses
- Premiere: 9 April 1709; Théâtre du Palais-Royal, Paris

Sémélé is an opera by Marin Marais with a libretto by Antoine Houdar de la Motte first performed on 9 April 1709, by the Paris Opera at the Théâtre du Palais-Royal. The opera is in the form of a tragédie en musique with a prologue and five acts.

Master viol player and composer Marin Marais became director of the Paris Opera in 1705 and presented, along with the established works of Jean-Baptiste Lully, two operas of his own during his brief tenure which ended in 1709. His opera Alcyone (1706) proved a successful stage work and was revived several times during the 18th Century. His final opera Sémélé (1709) did not fare as well. Opening during The Great Frost, an extraordinarily cold European winter that afflicted France particularly hard with food shortages and violent revolts in the streets of Paris, demand for Sémélé (and other new works introduced during this period) was modest. Amid the tumult, Marais retired as Director of the Opera to return to writing viol music. Sémélé disappeared from the repertory for nearly 300 years until a modern performing score published by France's Centre de Musique Baroque de Versailles revived interest in the work. Commemorating the 350th anniversary of the composer's birth, the French period-instrument ensemble Le Concert Spirituel, under the baton of Herve Niquet, performed the opera in concert at the Festival International d'Opéra Baroque in Beaune and then in Paris in 2006. The following year, the same ensemble presented Sémélé (minus Marais' 30-minute prologue, which was cut) in a fully staged production directed by Olivier Simonnet in Montpellier. The opera was presented for the first time outside of Europe by conductor Jeffrey Thomas and American Bach Soloists in San Francisco, August 13–14, 2015.

John Eccles 1707 opera Semele is based on the same myth from Ovid's Metamorphoses, and set to a libretto by William Congreve. This libretto (in expanded form) later served as the basis for yet another opera, by George Frideric Handel (1744). Based on a libretto by de la Motte, Marais' work bears significant narrative differences from the Congreve-based operas. Handel's Semele is a well known standard repertory opera today.

== Plot and music outline ==
Prologue

Ægipans and Mænads, led by a Priest and Priestess of Bacchus, are participating in a Bacchanal. All drink copious amounts of wine, the gift of Bacchus until they are robbed of their wits. Love (Cupid) is invited to participate, but he is admonished to leave his darts behind and let the wine replace their effects. When the noise of their revelry reaches a peak, Apollo descends from the heavens, bringing with him calming, harmonious music. He is pleased by the celebrations, as Bacchus is, after all, his brother by the same father, Jupiter. To consecrate their festival and the elevation of Bacchus to the ranks of the gods, Apollo asks the Muses to tell the story of how Bacchus came to be.

Act I

Cadmus, the king of Thebes, has granted the hand of his daughter Semele to prince Adraste, but Semele has fallen in love with Jupiter, who courted her in disguise as Idas. Cadmus speaks to Semele about her imminent marriage to Adraste, then enters the Temple of Jupiter to offer praise. Semele confides in her maid, Dorine, that, although she loves Idas, she will obey her father's will. Adraste arrives and professes his love for Semele. Festivities celebrate Adraste's military exploits, but they are interrupted by signs of the gods’ anger. Adraste vows to circumvent whatever reason the heavens might have for their anger. Semele politely reiterates her loyalty to her father's wishes.

Act II

Dorine and her lover, Arbate (Mercury in disguise), consider Semele's difficult situation and reconfirm their love for each other. Semele tries to shun Idas (Jupiter in disguise) to fulfill her obligation of betrothal to Adraste. Jupiter reveals his identity to her and organizes a celebration. A chorus of fauns, nymphs, and naiads sing and dance. Adraste appears and questions Semele, who tells him that she is loved by a god. Adraste tries to attack Jupiter, but a cloud spirits Jupiter and Semele away, leaving Adraste behind vowing revenge.

Act III

Adraste proclaims his determination to raise all other gods against Jupiter. He calls upon Juno, Jupiter's wife, to join him in avenging Jupiter's unfaithfulness. Juno sends Adraste away so that she can plot her revenge. She takes on a disguise as Beroe, Semele's nurse, to enact her jealous hatred of Semele, made even stronger when she sees Semele's beauty. Planting seeds of doubt in Semele's mind, Juno (as Beroe) suggests that Semele might have been fooled, falsely wooed by an imposter. Semele entreats Beroe to help reveal the truth. Juno casts a spell and calls upon Furies and Demons from Hell to frighten Semele, who decides that she will ask Jupiter to prove his identity to her.

Act IV

Mercury reveals his true identity to Dorine, who has loved him solely in his disguise as Arbate. Dorine is fearful that Mercury will be as faithless to her as Jupiter will be to Semele. Mercury pledges his constancy and together they sing of renewed vows. Jupiter's approach reminds Mercury that he has been sent to the grotto to prepare a pastoral setting for Jupiter and Semele to enjoy. Shepherds and shepherdesses sing and dance for the couple. Jupiter tries to persuade Semele to forget his grandeur and dream of his tenderness, but she cannot quiet her doubts and demands that he appear in his full splendor. Jupiter resists, knowing that if he would display himself in his true, divine form, Semele will perish.

Act V

Cadmus and his people prepare for the arrival of Jupiter. Adraste accepts his impending fate as the result of both his love for Semele and her ambitious pursuit of glory as the lover of Jupiter. Cadmus, Semele, and the people voice their entreaties to Jupiter but are interrupted by an earthquake, thunder, and lightning. All flee as a shower of fire engulfs Semele and Adraste. Adraste is killed and Semele submits to her fiery end. Jupiter calls Semele back to life and elevates her to a place in the heavens.

== Roles and role creators ==
| Role | Voice type | Premiere Cast, April 9, 1709 (Conductor:) |
|---|---|---|
| Apollon | tenor (haute-contre) | Beaufort |
| Sémélé | soprano | Françoise Journet |
| Dorine | soprano | Marie-Catherine Poussin |
| The grand priestess of Bacchus | soprano | Dun |
| Junon | mezzo-soprano | Françoise Dujardin |
| Adraste | tenor (haute-contre) | Jacques Cochereau |
| Jupiter | baritone | Gabriel-Vincent Thévenard |
| Mercure | baritone | Jean Dun "pére" |
| Cadmus, grand priest of Bacchus | baritone | Charles Hardouin |
| First shepherdess | soprano | Aubert |
| Second shepherdess | soprano | Daulin |
| Third shepherdess | soprano | Boisé |

== Recordings ==
A recording of the work under the direction of Hervé Niquet was published in 2007 by Glossa.

A recording of instrumental music from the opera, performed by Wieland Kuijken and Montréal Baroque, was released in late 2006.

== Sources ==
- Casaglia, Gherardo (2005)."Sémélé, 9 April 1709". L'Almanacco di Gherardo Casaglia (in Italian).
