= Prosymnus =

Mythological man associated with Dionysus

In Greek mythology, Prosymnus (Ancient Greek: Πρόσυμνος, romanized: Prósumnos), also called Poly(hy)mnus (Ancient Greek: Πόλυμνος, Πολύυμνος, romanized: Pólumnos, Polúumnos, lit. 'with many hymns') or Hypolipnus, is a shepherd associated with the god Dionysus and Bacchic rites. Prosymnus helped Dionysus navigate the hazardous Alcyonian Lake in the Argolid on his way to bring his mother Semele back from the dead. Prosymnus asked for sexual favours as a reward, but died before Dionysus could keep his oath.

Prosymnus' myth is known through late-antiquity authors, particularly Christian ones criticising pagan traditions, but it seems that it had a genuine origin in older Dionysian cults.

== Etymology ==
Prosymnus' name derives from the ancient Greek verb προσυμνέω (prosymnéō) meaning 'to sing besides'.

== Mythology ==
=== Dionysus' descent ===
Once the god Dionysus needed to descend to the Underworld to fetch his mother Semele through the bottomless Alcyonian Lake (Lerna) near Argos, but he did not know the way. Prosymnus offered to show him the way, but taking a glimpse at Dionysus' youth and extraordinary beauty he declared he would not do it without a reward, and asked for the right to make love to the god, who was to suffer the 'pleasures of a wife'. Dionysus agreed to do so after he had rescued his mother from Hades.

When Dionysus re-emerged again after having successfully retrieved his mother, he found that in the meantime Prosymnus had died. Determined to keep his promise nevertheless, he took a sturdy branch from a fig tree and carved it in the shape of a man's penis. Then he went nude to Prosymnus' tomb, put the phallus straight on a mound, lowered himself on it and ritually fulfilled his promise to the man.

=== Variations ===
Other versions say that Prosymnus (here spelled Polymnus) was a young lover of the god, but drowned in Lerna before he could consummate his relationship with Dionysus, so Dionysus wore a wood-carved phallus around his neck to honour him. John Tzetzes also mentions Dionysus attaching fig-wood genitals on him and deer skin phalli which is why the god was called Enorches, (Note: From the word ὄρχις (órkhis) meaning testicle.) but in connection to the Semele version. According to one anonymous Greek paradoxographer, Polymnus drowned when they reached and entered Lerna, being a mortal, unlike Dionysus who was a god.

== Interpretation ==
The story can be reconstructed using the various versions by late antiquty authors. Arnobius and Clement's works, two of the fullest sources for the tale, were attacks on the old religion from a Christian perspective or attempts to ridicule and show the obscenity of pagan beliefs; Clement denounced the sexual elements of the cults of Dionysus and Demeter, while Arnobius states that Dionysus experienced pleasure from the act. They are not however the only sources of the tale.

The myth seems to have been used to explain the wide use of phalli in the procession rituals in the cult of Dionysus. Karl Kerenyi suggested the myth was aition for the employment of phallic mortuary monuments in tombs. It is tied to 'Androgynos' an epithet of Dionysus meaning 'effeminate' or 'hermaphroditic', denoting taking both active male roles and passive female ones. Gregorius of Nazianzus also called Dionysus an androgynos while briefly hinting to the myth of Prosymnus. Pausanias mentions nocturnal rites in honour of Dionysus at the lake, but refuses to elaborate on what those were. Those rites were likely secret, but Plutarch records that the people of the wider Argos area would throw a lamb into Lerna while calling to Dionysus to come out of the water. The cult was part of a wider symbolism and connection between lakes and Dionysus, who held the epithet Limnaios ("he of the lake"). The catabasis into the lake symbolises death-and-rebirth deities, the hero who enters the Underworld and then re-emerges as a god. In a similar Argive tradition, during Dionysus' war against the Argives for rejecting his worship, King Perseus flung Dionysus into Lerna. The lake represents the link between the world of the living and that of the dead, and it is the god himself who drowns in the lake.

The fig, which is widespread all over the Mediterranean, is present in various cults and myths, including the mythology of Demeter as well as Dionysus, two deities connected to the vegetation and the Underworld. It being used to form the phallus is justified in its status as fertility symbol. Furthermore, the mysteries of Lerna worshipped Demeter under the epithet Prosymna, which evokes Dionysus' guide; 'Polymnus' translates to 'he with many hymns' and is an adequate name for cult purposes, though it could also be a misspelling judging from Demeter's title.

== See also ==
Other sexuality-related elements of the ancient Greek religion:

- Priapus
- Baubo
- Hermaphroditus

== Bibliography ==
- Arnobius, Seven Books Against the Heathen, translated into English by the Christian Classics Ethereal Library, edited by Alexander Roberts, D.D. and James Donaldson, LL.D. Edinburgh: T. & T. Clark. Online available at Intratext.
- Calimach, Andrew (2002). Lovers' Legends: The Gay Greek Myths. New Rochelle: Haiduk Press. ISBN 0-9714686-0-5.
- Christopoulos, Menelaos (2023). "Dionysus' Katabasis and the Mysteries of Lerna". In Christopoulos, Menelaos; Meyer, Marion; Papachrysostomou, Athina (eds.). Unveiling the Hidden Face of Antiquity: Mysteries and Cryptic Cults. Vienna: Phoibos verlag.
- Clement of Alexandria, The Exhortation to the Greeks, The Rich Man's Salvation, To the Newly Baptized. Translated by G. W. Butterworth. Loeb Classical Library 92. Cambridge, MA: Harvard University Press, 1919. Loeb Digital Library.
- Dalby, Andrew (2003). The Story of Bacchus. London: British Museum Press. ISBN 0-7141-2255-6.
- Frazer, James G. (1921). Apollodorus, the Library. Vol. 1. London: William Heinemann.
- Grimal, Pierre (1987). The Dictionary of Classical Mythology. Wiley-Blackwell. ISBN 0-631-13209-0.
- Hyginus, Astronomica from The Myths of Hyginus translated and edited by Mary Grant. University of Kansas Publications in Humanistic Studies. Online version at the Topos Text Project.
- Jiménez San Cristóbal, Ana Isabel (2021). "Artemis and Dionysus. Encounters in Natural settings". In Casadio, Giovanni; Johnston, Patricia A. (eds.). Artemis and Diana in Ancient Greece and Italy: At the Crossroads between the Civic and the Wild. Newcastle-upon-Tyne, UK: Cambridge Scholars Publishing. ISBN 978-1-5275-6614-9.
- Kerenyi, Karl (1976). Dionysos: Archetypal Image of Indestructable Life. Translated by Ralph Manheim. New York, US: Princeton University Press. ISBN 0-691-02915-6.
- Käppel, Lutz (October 1, 2006). "Prosymnus". In Cancik, Hubert; Schneider, Helmuth (eds.). Brill's New Pauly. Translated by Christine F. Salazar. Kiel: Brill Reference Online. ISSN 1574-9347.
- Larson, Jennifer (6 September 2012). Greek and Roman Sexualities: A Sourcebook. Bloomsbury Publishing. ISBN 9781441153371..
- Liddell, Henry George; Scott, Robert (1940). A Greek-English Lexicon, revised and augmented throughout by Sir Henry Stuart Jones with the assistance of Roderick McKenzie. Oxford: Clarendon Press. Online version at Perseus.tufts project.
- Pausanias, Description of Greece with an English Translation by W.H.S. Jones, Litt.D., and H.A. Ormerod, M.A., in 4 Volumes. Cambridge, MA, Harvard University Press; London, William Heinemann Ltd. 1918. Online version at the Perseus Digital Library.
- Pequigney, Joseph (2002). "Classical Mythology". GLBTQ Encyclopedia. New England Publishing Associates. Archived from the original on 15 April 2014.
- Plutarch, On Isis and Osiris in Moralia, translated from the Greek by several hands. Corrected and revised by. William W. Goodwin, PH. D. Boston. Little, Brown, and Company. Cambridge. Press Of John Wilson and son. 1874. 4. Available on the Perseus Digital Library.
- Pseudo-Nonnus, The Syriac version of the pseudo-Nonnos mythological scholia, translated to English and edited by Sebastian Brock. Cambridge University Press; London. 1971. Internet Archive.
- Sudas, Suda, translated and edited by several authors, including Ross Scaife. Suda on Line.
- Tzetzes, John, Lycophronis Alexandra. Vol. II: Scholia Continens, edited by Eduard Scheer, Berlin, Weidmann, 1881. Internet Archive.
- Westermann, Anton (1839). Paradoxographoe. London: Harvard College Library.
