= Lerna =

Region in classical Greece

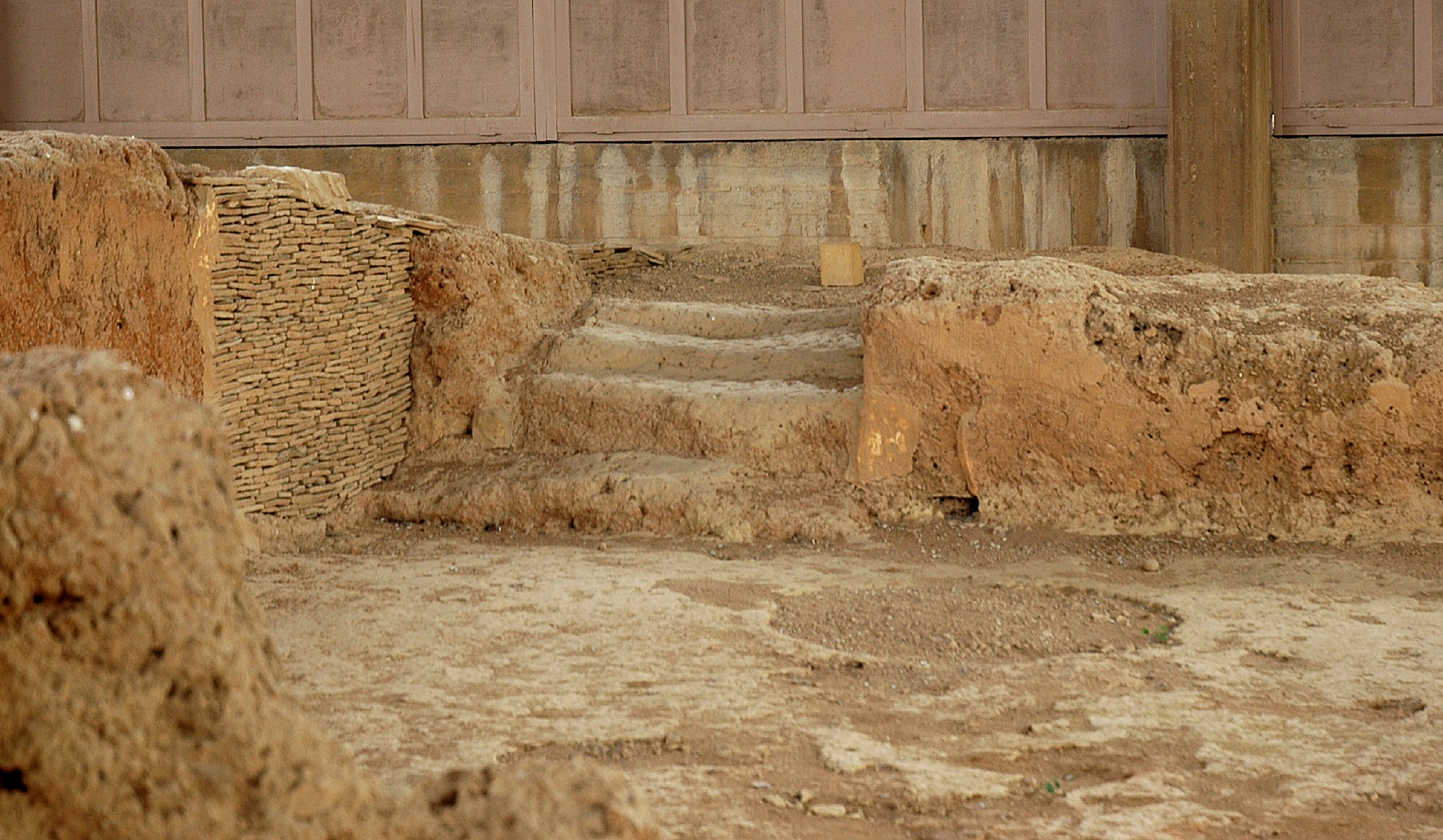
- Stairs to an upper floor in the Early Helladic House of the Tiles

- Location within Greece
- 37°33′N 22°43′E
- Type: Settlement
- Periods: Early Helladic II to Mycenean
- Location: Myloi, Peloponnese, Greece

History
- Built: 2500 BCE
- Abandoned: 1250 BCE

Site notes
- Management: 4th Ephorate of Prehistoric and Classical Antiquities
- Website: Lerna

In classical Greece, Lerna (Greek: Λέρνα or Λέρνη) was a region of springs and a former lake located in the municipality of the same name, near the east coast of the Peloponnesus, south of Argos. Even though much of the area is marshy, Lerna is located on a geographically narrow point between mountains and the sea, along an ancient route from the Argolid to the southern Peloponnese; this location may have resulted in the importance of the settlement.

Its site near the village Mili at the Argolic Gulf is most famous as the lair of the Lernaean Hydra, the chthonic many-headed water snake, a creature of great antiquity when Heracles killed it, as the second of his labours. The strong Karstic springs remained; the lake, diminished to a silt lagoon by the 19th century, has vanished.

Lerna is notable for several archaeological sites, including an Early Bronze Age structure known as House of the Tiles, dating to the Early Helladic period II (2500–2300 BC).

== Myths ==
The secret of the Lernaean spring was the gift of Poseidon when he lay with the "blameless" daughter of Danaus, Amymone. The geographer Strabo attests that the Lernaean waters were considered healing:

Lake Lerna, the scene of the story of the Hydra, lies in Argeia and the Mycenaean territory; and on account of the cleansings that take place in it there arose a proverb, 'A Lerna of ills.' Now writers agree that the county has plenty of water, and that, although the city itself lies in a waterless district, it has an abundance of wells. These wells they ascribe to the daughters of Danaus, believing that they discovered them ... but they add that four of the wells not only were designated as sacred but are especially revered, thus introducing the false notion that there is a lack of water where there is an abundance of it.

Lerna was one of the entrances to the Underworld, and the ancient Lernaean Mysteries, sacred to Demeter, were celebrated there, along with a festival called the Lernaea, which was also held in her honour. Pausanias (2.37.1) says that the mysteries were initiated by Philammon, the twin "other" of Autolycus. Heroes could gain entry to the netherworld via the Alcyonian Lake. Prosymnus aided Dionysus in his search for his mother Semele by guiding him to this entrance. For mortals the lake was perilous; Pausanias writes:

There is no limit to the depth of the Alcyonian Lake, and I know of nobody who by any contrivance has been able to reach the bottom of it since not even Nero, who had ropes made several stades long and fastened them together, tying lead to them, and omitting nothing that might help his experiment, was able to discover any limit to its depth. This, too, I heard. The water of the lake is, to all appearance, calm and quiet but, although it is such to look at, every swimmer who ventures to cross it is dragged down, sucked into the depths, and swept away.

At Lerna, Plutarch knew (Isis and Osiris), Dionysus was summoned as "Bugenes", "son of the Bull" with a strange archaic trumpet called a salpinx, while a lamb was cast into the waters as an offering for the "Keeper of the Gate." The keeper of the gate to the Underworld that lay in the waters of Lerna was the Hydra.

== Archaeology ==
Excavations at the site were initiated under John L. Caskey in 1952, whose efforts initiated the series of publications of Bronze Age Lerna, Lerna I-V, inspiring many other publications.

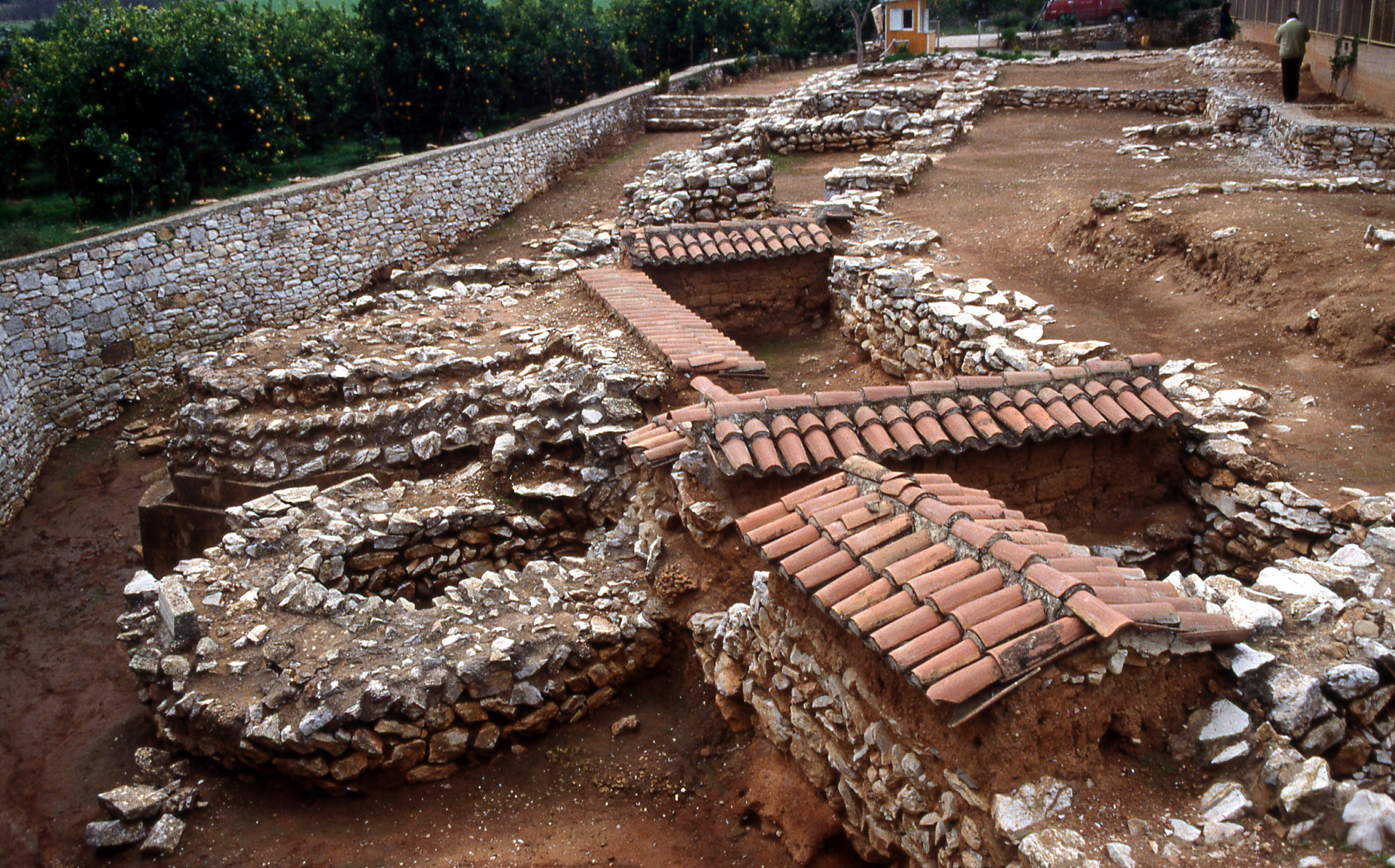
Early Helladic fortification wall of Lerna III

Lerna was occupied in Neolithic times, as early as the fifth millennium BCE, then was abandoned for a time before the sequence of occupation from the Early to Late Bronze Age (Early Helladic through Late Helladic or Mycenaean period). On-site techniques of flint-knapping with imported obsidian and chert attest to cultural continuity over this long stretch of time, with reduction in the supply of obsidian from Melos testifying to reduced long-distance trade at the end of Early Helladic III, corresponding to Lerna IV.

The site of Lerna is one of the largest prehistoric tumuli in Greece (ca. 180 m by 160 m across), which accumulated during a long Neolithic occupation. The crest of the mound was levelled and extended in the Early Bronze Age (Early Helladic II period, ca. 2500–2200 BC), as at Eutresis and Orchomenus, for the construction of a new settlement, known as Lerna III in the site's stratigraphy. Lerna III lacks signs of continuity with the previous occupation. It was strongly fortified by a double ring of defensive walls with towers and was the site of a two-storey palace or administrative center known as House of the Tiles, for the terracotta tiles that sheathed its roof (an early example of tile roofing). This building was destroyed by fire at the end of the Early Helladic II period. In the following period (Lerna IV = Early Helladic III) the site of the "House of the Tiles" was covered by an earthen tumulus and not built upon again, whether through respect or fear, until, at the end of the Middle Helladic period, shaft graves were cut into the tumulus, suggesting that the significance of the monument had been forgotten. Lerna was used as a cemetery during the Mycenaean age (Late Helladic period), but was abandoned about 1250 BCE.

Ceramics of Lerna III include the hallmark spouted vessels that archaeologists name "sauceboats", with rims that sweep upwards into a curved spout, as well as bowls with incurving rims, both flat-bottomed and with ring bases, and wide saucers, sometimes with glazed rims, more pleasant for the drinker's lips. Jars and hydria have swelling curves. Painted decoration is sparse; stamped sealing form decorative patterns on some pieces, or rolled scribed cylinders have been used to make banded patterns. Remarkably, banded patterns made with the self-same seal have been found at Lerna, Tiryns and Zygouries. The burning of the House of Tiles brought the Third Period at Lerna to a decisive close; a low round tumulus marked its undisturbed, apparently sacrosanct site.

Lerna IV (Early Helladic III) marked a fresh start, not as a fortified seat of central authority this time, but as a small town, with houses of two and three rooms with walls of crude brick set upon stone foundations; several had central circular hearths. Narrow lanes separated houses. A great profusion of unlined pits (bothroi) was characteristic of this phase: eventually they became filled with waste matter, bones, potsherds, even whole pots. The pottery, markedly discontinuous with Lerna III, shows a range of new forms, and the first signs— regular spiral grooves in bases and parallel incised lines— marking the increasing use of the potter's wheel. Painted linear decoration in dark glaze on the pale body is characteristic of Lerna IV. Caskey identified early examples of the ware that in Middle Helladic contexts would be recognized as Minyan ware, and, among the few examples of imported pottery, a winged jar characteristic of Troy, perhaps Troy IV.

Lerna V is continuous with the preceding phase, distinguished largely by new styles in pottery with the sudden, peaceful introduction of matte-painted ware, the thick-slipped Argive version of gray Minyan ware, and a vigorous increase in the kinds of imported wares, coming from the Cyclades and Crete (Middle Minoan IA). A new custom of burying the dead in excavations within the houses or between them is universal at the period.

Modern geological techniques such as core drilling have identified the site of the vanished sacred Lake Lerna, which was a freshwater lagoon, separated by barrier dunes from the Aegean. In the Early Bronze Age Lake Lerna had an estimated diameter of 4.7 km. Deforestation increased the rate of silt deposits and the lake became a malarial marsh, of which the last remnants were drained in the nineteenth century.

== Etymology ==
The lake is called "the Lake of Darkness" in Shakespeare's King Lear; see Nero in the arts and popular culture
