= Semele =

Mother of Dionysus in Greek mythology

- Princess of Thebes; Goddess of the Bacchic frenzy
- Member of the Theban Royal Family
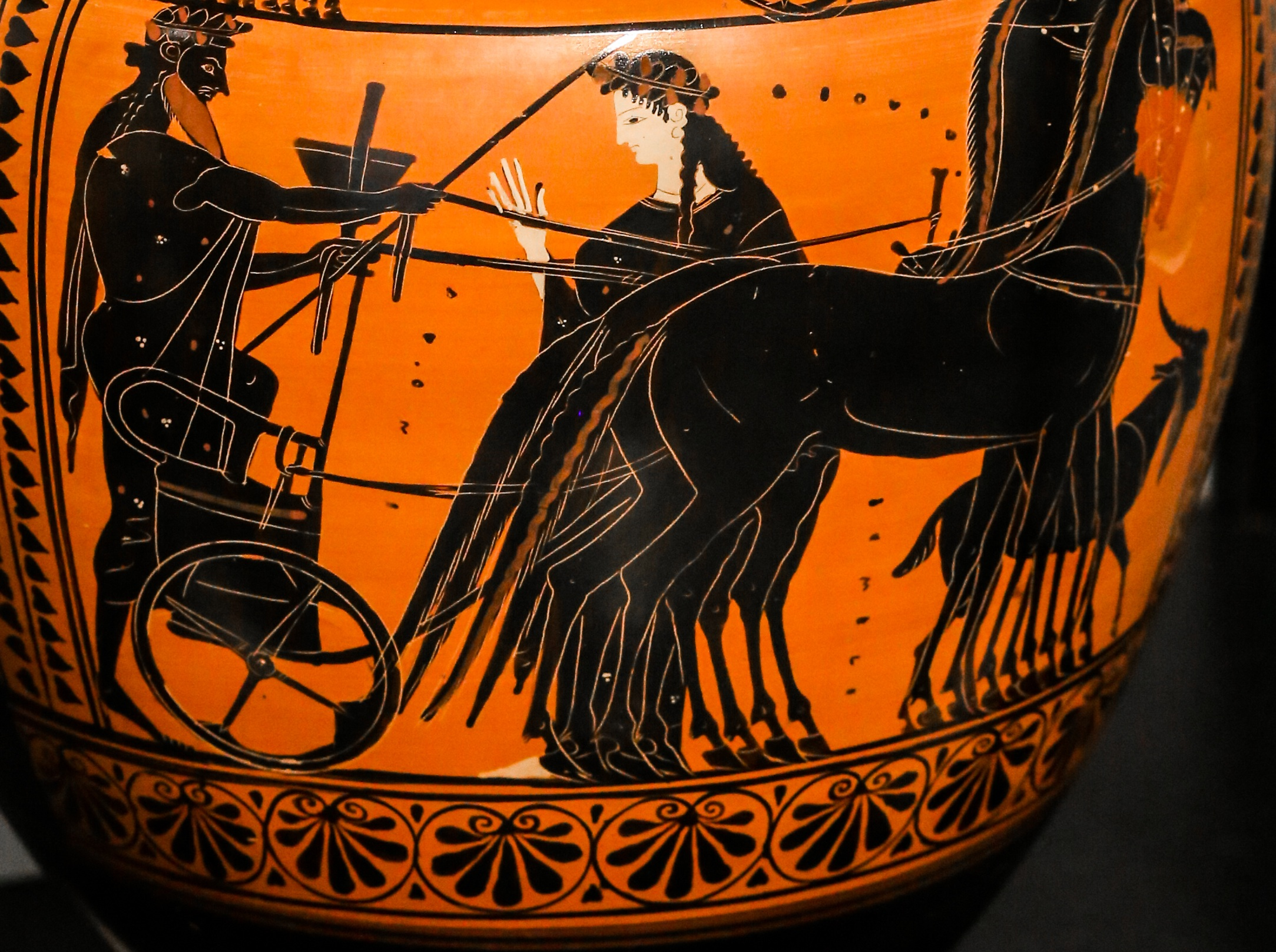
- Semele and Dionysus on a black-figure hydria, ca. 520-500 BC, Antikensammlung Berlin
- Other names: Thyone
- Abode: Thebes, Mount Olympus

Genealogy
- Parents: Cadmus and Harmonia
- Siblings: Autonoë, Agave, Ino and Polydorus
- Consort: Zeus
- Children: Dionysus

In Greek mythology, Semele (/ˈsɛmɪli/; Ancient Greek: Σεμέλη, romanized: Semélē), or Thyone (/θaɪˈoʊni/; Ancient Greek: Θυώνη, romanized: Thyṓnē), was the youngest daughter of Cadmus and Harmonia, and the mother of Dionysus by Zeus (her own great-grandfather).

Certain elements of the cult of Dionysus and Semele came from the Phrygians. These were modified, expanded, and elaborated by the Ionian Greek colonists. Doric Greek historian Herodotus (c. 484–425 BC), born in the city of Halicarnassus under the Achaemenid Empire, who gives the account of Cadmus, estimates that Semele lived either 1,000 or 1,600 years prior to his visit to Tyre in 450 BC at the end of the Greco-Persian Wars (499–449 BC) or around 2050 or 1450 BC. In Rome, the goddess Stimula was identified as Semele.

Semele was the subject of the now-lost tragedy by Aeschylus titled Semele (Σεμέλη) or The Water Carriers (Ὑδροφόροι).

== Etymology ==
According to some linguists the name Semele is Thraco-Phrygian, derived from a PIE root meaning 'earth'. A Phrygian inscription refers to diōs zemelō (διως ζεμελω). The first word corresponds to Greek Zeus (genit. Dios) and the second to earth in some Indo-European languages. Julius Pokorny reconstructs her name from the PIE root *dgem- meaning 'earth', and relates it with Thracian Zemele, 'mother earth'. Compare Žemyna (derived from žemė – earth), the goddess of the earth (mother goddess) in Lithuanian mythology, and Zeme, also referred to as Zemes-mãte, a Slavic and Latvian goddess of the earth.

Mallory and Adams suggest that, although Semele is "etymologically related" to other mother Earth/Earth goddess cognates, her name might be a borrowing "from another IE source", not inherited as part of the Ancient Greek lexicon. Burkert says that while Semele is "manifestly non-Greek", "it is no more possible to confirm that Semele is a Thraco-Phrygian word for earth than it is to prove the priority of the Lydian baki- over Bacchus as a name for Dionysos". M. L. West derives the Phrygian zemelo, Old Slavonic zemlya, Lithuanian zēmē from the Indo-European name *dʰéǵʰōm (earth). Semele seems to be a Thracian name of the earth goddess from gʰem-elā. The pronunciation was probably Zemelā.

Etymological connections of Thraco-Phrygian Semele with Balto-Slavic earth deities have been noted, for an alternate name for Baltic Zemyna is Žemelė, and in Slavic languages the word seme (Semele) means 'seed', and zemlja (Zemele) means 'earth'. Thus, according to Borissoff, "she could be an important link bridging the ancient Thracian and Slavonic cults (...)".

== Mythology ==
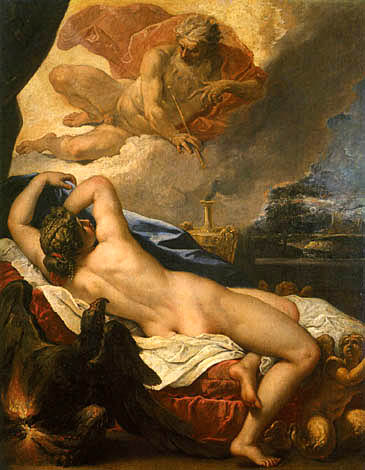
Jove and Semele (1695) by Sebastiano Ricci. Galleria degli Uffizi, Florence

=== Seduction by Zeus and birth of Dionysus ===
In one version of the myth, Semele was a priestess of Zeus, and on one occasion was observed by Zeus as she slaughtered a bull at his altar and afterwards swam in the river Asopus to cleanse herself of the blood. Flying over the scene in the guise of an eagle, Zeus fell in love with Semele and repeatedly visited her secretly.

Zeus's wife, Hera, a goddess jealous of usurpers, discovered his affair with Semele when she later became pregnant. Appearing as an old crone, Hera befriended Semele, who confided in her that her lover was actually Zeus. Hera pretended not to believe her, and planted seeds of doubt in Semele's mind. Curious, Semele asked Zeus to grant her a boon. Zeus, eager to please his beloved, promised on the River Styx to grant her anything she wanted.

Semele then demanded that Zeus reveal himself in all his glory as proof of his divinity. Though Zeus begged her not to ask this, she persisted, and he was forced by his oath to comply. He appears to her in all his splendor, with concomitant thunderbolts and lightning, causing her death.

Zeus rescued the fetal Dionysus, however, by sewing him into his thigh (whence the epithet Eiraphiotes, 'insewn', of the Homeric Hymn). A few months later, Dionysus was born. This leads to his being called "the twice-born".

When he grew up, Dionysus rescued his mother from Hades, and she became a goddess on Mount Olympus, with the new name Thyone, presiding over the frenzy inspired by her son Dionysus. At a later point in the epic Dionysiaca, Semele, now resurrected, boasts to her sister Ino how Zeus carried on the gestation of Dionysus and now her son gets to join the heavenly deities in Olympus, while Ino languishes with a murderous husband (since Athamas tried to kill Ino and her son), and a son that lives with maritime deities.

=== Impregnation by Zeus ===
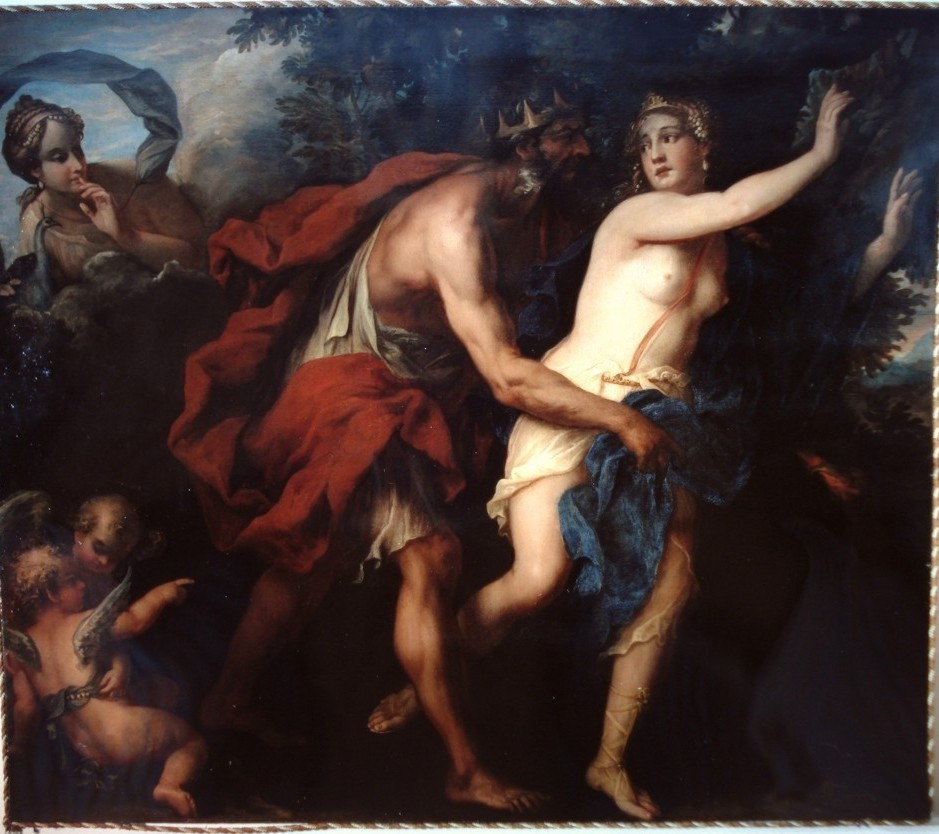
Zeus, Semele und Hera. 17th century (Erasmus Quellinus II or Jan Erasmus Quellinus)

There is a story in the Fabulae 167 of Gaius Julius Hyginus, or a later author whose work has been attributed to Hyginus. In this, Dionysus (called Liber) is the son of Jupiter and Proserpina, and was killed by the Titans. Jupiter gave his torn up heart in a drink to Semele, who became pregnant this way. But in another account, Zeus swallows the heart himself, in order to beget his seed on Semele. Hera then convinces Semele to ask Zeus to come to her as a god, and on doing so she dies, and Zeus seals the unborn baby up in his thigh. As a result of this Dionysus "was also called Dimetor [of two mothers] ... because the two Dionysoi were born of one father, but of two mothers"

Still another variant of the narrative is found in Callimachus and the 5th century CE Greek writer Nonnus. In this version, the first Dionysus is called Zagreus. Nonnus does not present the conception as virginal; rather, the editor's notes say that Zeus swallowed Zagreus's heart, and visited the mortal woman Semele, whom he seduced and made pregnant. Nonnus classifies Zeus's affair with Semele as one in a set of twelve, the other eleven women on whom he begot children being Io, Europa, Pluto, Danaë, Aigina, Antiope, Leda, Dia, Alcmene, Laodameia, the mother of Sarpedon, and Olympias.

== Locations ==
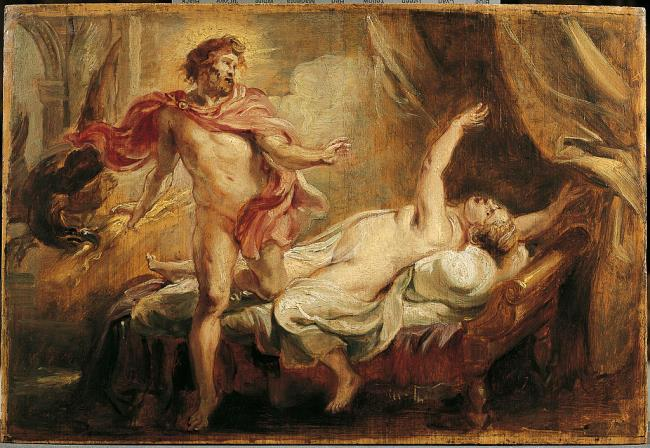
Rubens. Jupiter and Semele (Ovid, Metamorphoses, III, 259–309). Royal Museums of Fine Arts of Belgium

The most usual setting for the story of Semele is the palace that occupied the acropolis of Thebes, called the Cadmeia. When Pausanias visited Thebes in the 2nd century CE, he was shown the very bridal chamber where Zeus visited her and begat Dionysus. Since an Oriental inscribed cylindrical seal found at the palace can be dated 14th-13th centuries, the myth of Semele must be Mycenaean or earlier in origin. At the Alcyonian Lake near the prehistoric site of Lerna, Dionysus, guided by Prosymnus or Polymnus, descended to Tartarus to free his once-mortal mother. Annual rites took place there in classical times; Pausanias refuses to describe them.

Though the Greek myth of Semele was localized in Thebes, the fragmentary Homeric Hymn to Dionysus makes the place where Zeus gave a second birth to the god a distant one, and mythically vague:

"For some say, at Dracanum; and some, on windy Icarus; and some, in Naxos, O Heaven-born, Insewn; and others by the deep-eddying river Alpheus that pregnant Semele bare you to Zeus the thunder-lover. And others yet, lord, say you were born in Thebes; but all these lie. The Father of men and gods gave you birth remote from men and secretly from white-armed Hera. There is a certain Nysa, a mountain most high and richly grown with woods, far off in Phoenice, near the streams of Aegyptus..."

Semele was worshipped at Athens at the Lenaia, when a yearling bull, emblematic of Dionysus, was sacrificed to her. One-ninth was burnt on the altar in the Hellenic way; the rest was torn and eaten raw by the votaries.

A unique tale, "found nowhere else in Greece" and considered to be a local version of her legend, is narrated by geographer Pausanias in his Description of Greece: after giving birth to her semi-divine son, Dionysus, fathered by Zeus, Semele was banished from the realm by her father Cadmus. Their sentence was to be put into a chest or a box (larnax) and cast in the sea. Luckily, the casket they were in washed up by the waves at Prasiae. However, it has been suggested that this tale might have been a borrowing from the story of Danaë and Perseus.

Semele was a tragedy by Aeschylus; it has been lost, save a few lines quoted by other writers, and a papyrus fragment from Oxyrhynchus, P. Oxy. 2164.

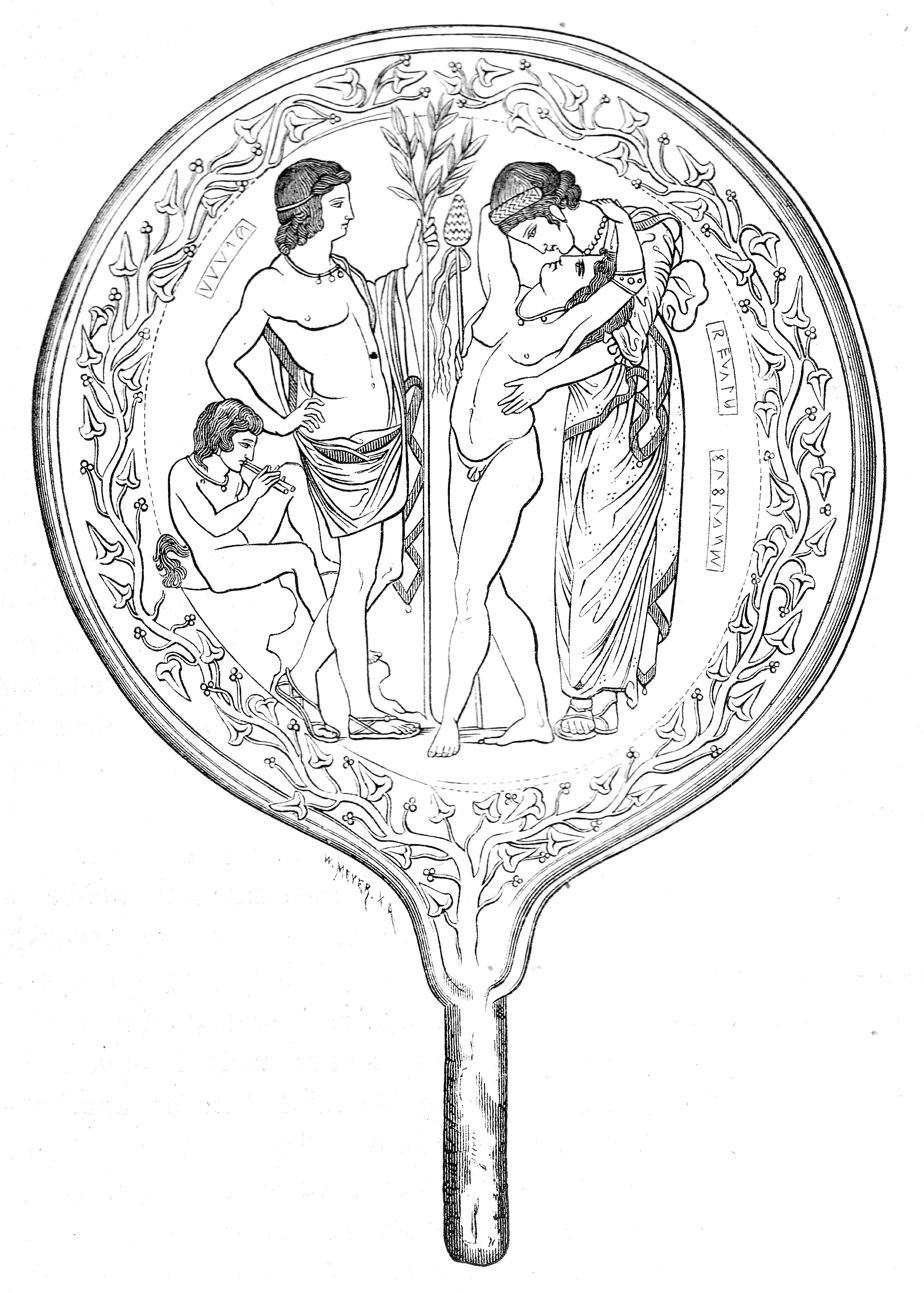
Drawing from an Etruscan mirror: Semele embracing her son Dionysus, with Apollo looking on and a satyr playing an aulos

== In Etruscan culture ==
Semele is attested with the Etruscan name form Semla, depicted on the back of a bronze mirror from the fourth century BC.

== In Roman culture ==
In ancient Rome, a grove (lucus) near Ostia, situated between the Aventine Hill and the mouth of the Tiber River, was dedicated to a goddess named Stimula. W.H. Roscher includes the name Stimula among the indigitamenta, the lists of Roman deities maintained by priests to assure that the correct divinity was invoked in public rituals. In his poem on the Roman calendar, Ovid (d. 17 CE) identifies this goddess with Semele:

"There was a grove: known either as Semele's or Stimula's:
Inhabited, they say, by Italian Maenads.
Ino, asking them their nation, learned they were Arcadians,
And that Evander was the king of the place.
Hiding her divinity, Saturn's daughter cleverly
Incited the Latian Bacchae with deceiving words:"

"lucus erat, dubium Semelae Stimulaene vocetur;
maenadas Ausonias incoluisse ferunt:
quaerit ab his Ino quae gens foret. Arcadas esse
audit et Euandrum sceptra tenere loci;
dissimulata deam Latias Saturnia Bacchas
instimulat fictis insidiosa sonis:"

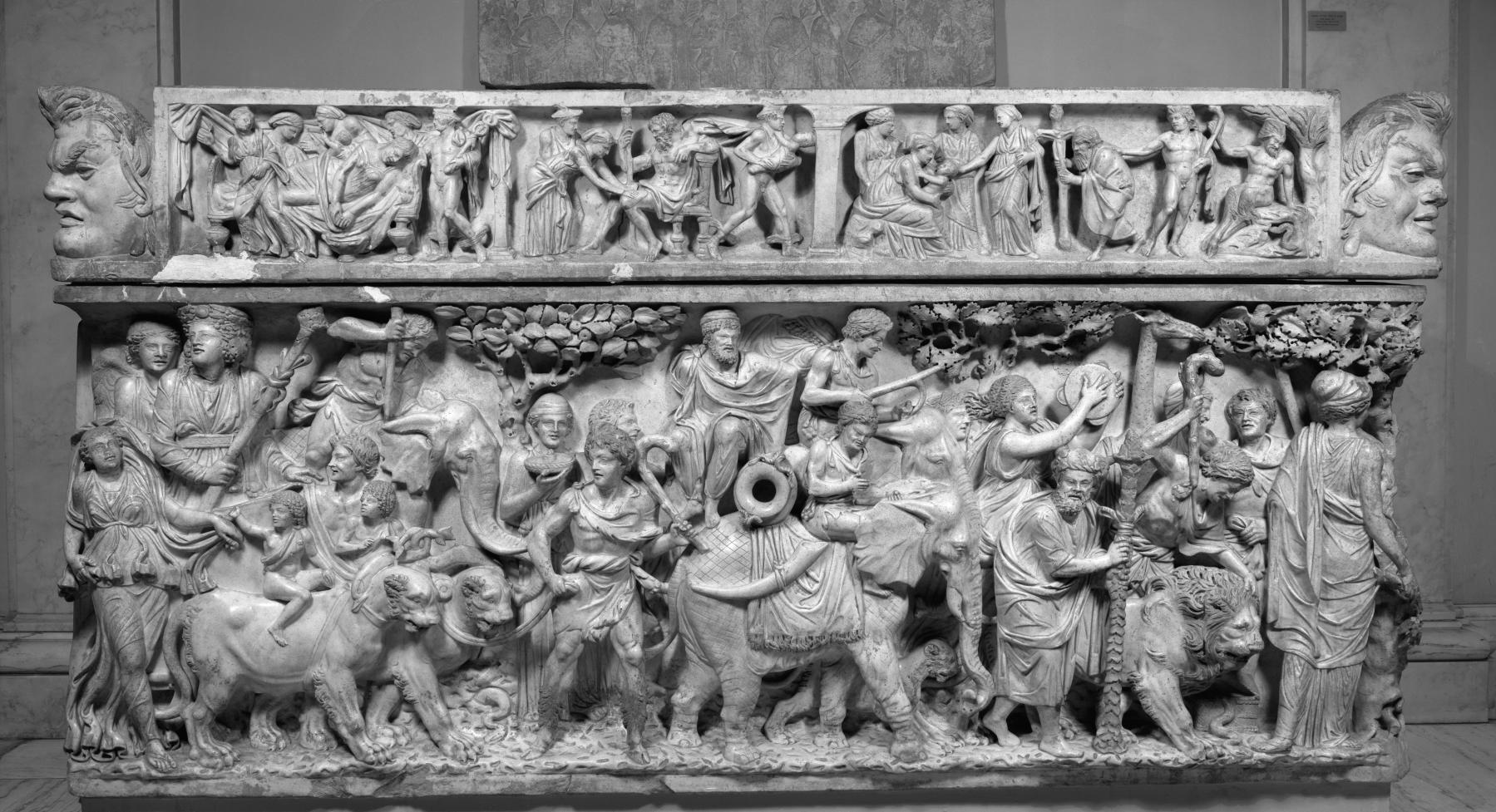
Roman sarcophagus (ca. AD 190) depicting the triumphal procession of Bacchus as he returns from India, with scenes of his birth in the smaller top panels (Walters Art Museum, Baltimore, Maryland)

Augustine notes that the goddess is named after stimulae, 'goads, whips,' by means of which a person is driven to excessive actions. The goddess's grove was the site of the Dionysian scandal that led to official attempts to suppress the cult. The Romans viewed the Bacchanals with suspicion, based on reports of ecstatic behaviors contrary to Roman social norms and the secrecy of initiatory rite. In 186 BC, the Roman Senate took severe actions to limit the cult, without banning it. Religious beliefs and myths associated with Dionysus were successfully adapted and remained pervasive in Roman culture, as evidenced for instance by the Dionysian scenes of Roman wall painting and on sarcophagi from the 1st to the 4th centuries AD.

The Greek cult of Dionysus had flourished among the Etruscans in the archaic period, and had been made compatible with Etruscan religious beliefs. One of the main principles of the Dionysian mysteries that spread to Latium and Rome was the concept of rebirth, to which the complex myths surrounding the god's own birth were central. Birth and childhood deities were important to Roman religion; Ovid identifies Semele's sister Ino as the nurturing goddess Mater Matuta. This goddess had a major cult center at Satricum that was built 500–490 BC. The female consort who appears with Bacchus in the acroterial statues there may be either Semele or Ariadne. The pair were part of the Aventine Triad in Rome as Liber and Libera, along with Ceres. The temple of the triad is located near the Grove of Stimula, and the grove and its shrine (sacrarium) were located outside Rome's sacred boundary (pomerium), perhaps as the "dark side" of the Aventine Triad.

== In the classical tradition ==
In the later mythological tradition of the Christian era, ancient deities and their narratives were often interpreted allegorically. In the Neoplatonic philosophy of Henry More (1614–1687), for instance, Semele was thought to embody "intellectual imagination", and was construed as the opposite of Arachne, "sense perception".

In the 18th century, the story of Semele formed the basis for three operas of the same name, the first by John Eccles (1707, to a libretto by William Congreve), another by Marin Marais (1709), and a third by George Frideric Handel (1742). Handel's work, based on Congreve's libretto but with additions, while an opera to its marrow, was originally given as an oratorio so that it could be performed in a Lenten concert series; it premiered on February 10, 1744. The German dramatist Schiller produced a singspiel entitled Semele in 1782. Victorian poet Constance Naden wrote a sonnet in the voice of Semele, first published in her 1881 collection Songs and Sonnets of Springtime. Paul Dukas composed a cantata, Sémélé.

== Genealogy ==
Argive genealogy in Greek mythology

Oceanus	Tethys
Inachus	Melia
Zeus	Io	Phoroneus
Epaphus	Memphis
Libya	Poseidon
Achiroë	Belus	Agenor	Telephassa
Danaus	Elephantis	Aegyptus	Cadmus	Cilix	Europa	Phoenix
Mantineus	Hypermnestra	Lynceus	Harmonia	Zeus
Sparta	Lacedaemon	Ocalea	Abas	Polydorus	Agave	Sarpedon	Rhadamanthus
Eurydice	Acrisius	Autonoë	Ino	Minos
Zeus	Danaë	Semele	Zeus
Perseus	Dionysus

Colour key:

Male
Female
Deity

== Astronomical bodies named after her ==
- Thyone: satellite of Jupiter
- 86 Semele: asteroid of the main belt

== Music named after her ==
- Nikolaus Strungk, Semele, opera (1681)
- John Eccles, Semele, opera (1706)
- Marin Marais, Sémélé, tragédie en musique (1709)
- Fracesco Mancini, La Semele, opera (1711)
- Élisabeth Jacquet de la Guerre, Sémélé, cantata (1715) EJG 37
- Antonio de Literes, Jupiter et Sémélé, opera (1718)
- André Cardinal Destouches, Sémélé, cantata (1719)
- Johann Adolf Hasse, La Semele o sia la richiesta fatale, serenata (1723)
- Georg Friedrich Haendel, Semele, oratorio (1743)
- Paul Dukas, Sémélé, cantata (1889)
- Michel Paul Guy de Chabanon, Sémélé, opera (no date given)

== See also ==
- Gaia
- *Dʰéǵʰōm
- Žemyna
- Mother nature
- 86 Semele
- Thyone (moon)
