= Lernaea (festival) =

Ancient Greek festival in honor of Demeter

The Lernaea (Ancient Greek: τὰ Λερναῖα) was an ancient and significant Greek festival held annually at Lerna, near Argos, by the Argives, primarily in honor of the goddess Demeter who was worshiped under the epithets "Lernaia" and "Prosymna" at the ancient sacred grove that extended to the rivers Amymone and Pontinos.

The entire festival included mysteries, considered a remnant of the older Pelasgian religion. According to Pausanias, this festival was founded by Philammon long before the descent of the Heraclidae and was possibly later combined with the Dionysian mystery celebrations. For this reason, phallic symbols were also used during the celebration of the Lernaea, and Thyades, women who carried thyrsi, participated in the festivities. This represented a mixture of figures and symbols from the worship of Dionysus, which was first introduced to the area by the ancient seer Melampus. The "sacred fire" for the rituals of the festival was brought by the Argives from the temple of "Artemis Pyronia", located on Mount Krathis. According to Plutarch, the celebrants began at night from Lake Alcyonia, holding thyrsi and proceeded by blowing trumpets and invoking the god Dionysus. They then sacrificed a ram in honor of Hades Pylaios, throwing its dismembered parts into the chasm in the region, where they believed he had disappeared with Persephone.

The connection between the Lernaea and the Eleusinian Mysteries is evident. Many sources also suggest that the hierophants of both festivals maintained contact. The Lernaea continued to be celebrated during the Roman era and even into the early Christian period.

== Bibliography ==
- Louis-Ferdinand-Alfred Maury. Religion de la Grèce (in French). Vol. 2. p. 370.
- William Smith; William Wayte; G. E. Marindin, eds. (1890). "LERNAEA". A Dictionary of Greek and Roman Antiquities.
- Pausanias, Description of Greece
