= Semele (Eccles) =

Opera of about 1706 by John Eccles

- Opera by John Eccles
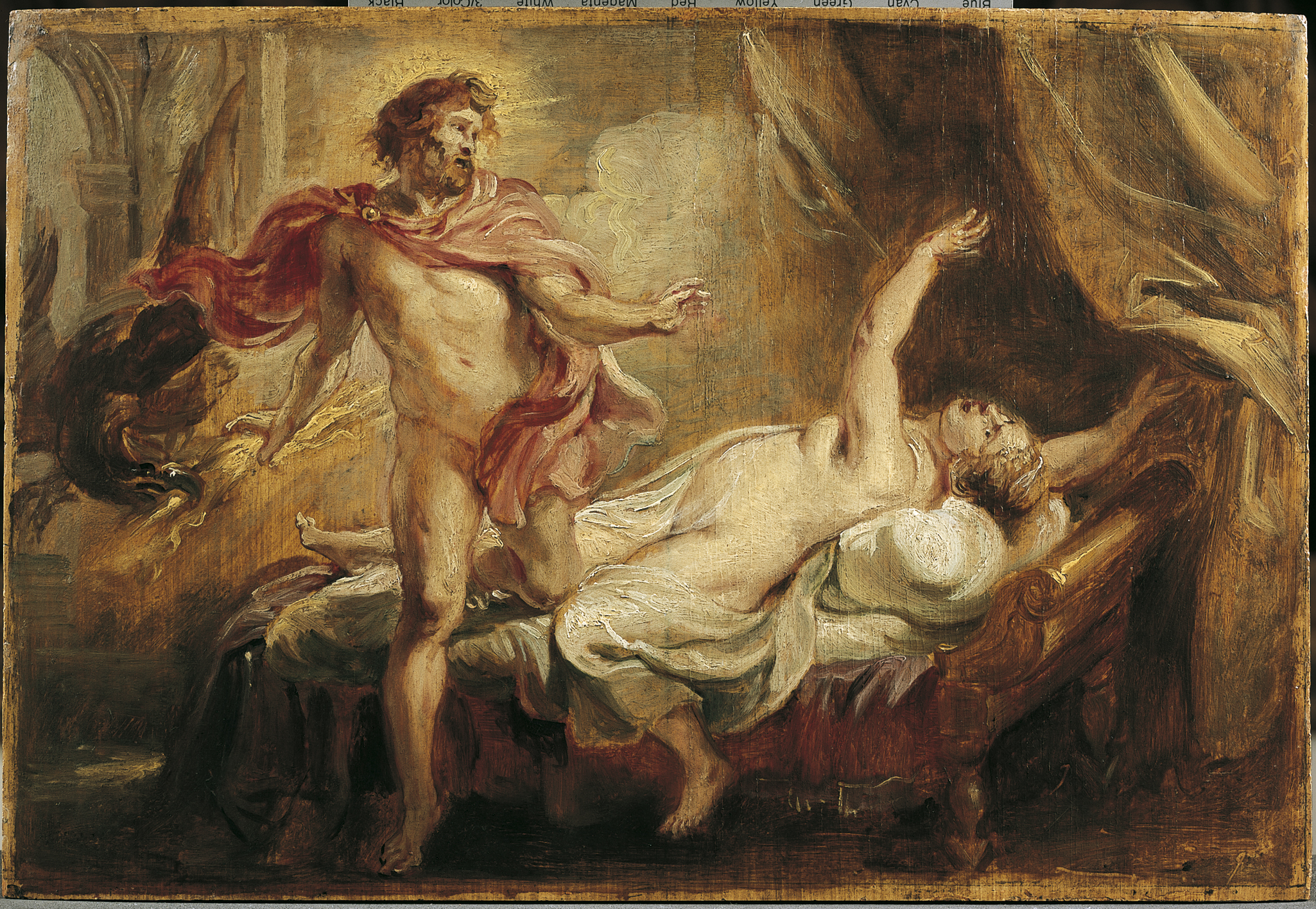
- Death of Semele by Rubens
- Librettist: William Congreve
- Based on: Ovid's Metamorphoses
- Premiere: 22 April 1972; St John's, Smith Square, London

Semele is an opera by John Eccles, written in about 1706 with a libretto by William Congreve drawing on the Semele myth from Ovid's Metamorphoses. It forms part of the English opera tradition of Blow's Venus and Adonis, but was never staged due to changes in popular taste at the time. Indeed, the opera remained unperformed until the mid twentieth century, eclipsed by George Frideric Handel's 1744 secular oratorio of the same name, based on the same libretto.

== Roles ==
Role	2004 Rooley recording	2021 AAM recording
Cadmus, king of Thebes	Kyle Ferrill	Jonathan Brown
Semele, daughter of Cadmus	Leslie Mangrum	Anna Dennis
Ino, sister of Semele	Lee Tayler	Aoife Miskelly
Jupiter, king of the gods	Mathew Roberson	Richard Burkhard
Juno, wife of Jupiter	Brenda Grau	Helen Charlston
Iris, handmaid to Juno	Barbara Clements	Héloïse Bernard
Somnus, god of sleep	Bragi Thor Valsson	Christopher Foster
Athamas, a prince of Bœotia	Kathleen Phipps	William Wallace
Cupid	Diane Coble	Bethany Horak-Hallett
Apollo	Scott MacLeod	Jolyon Loy
Chief Priest		Graeme Broadbent
Second Priest, First Augur		Rory Carver
Third Priest, Second Augur		James Rhoads

== Argument ==
In his introductory 'argument', Congreve briefly summarises the plot, explains why he has modified some of Ovid's story, and then goes on to explain for the audience's benefit the concept of musical recitative:

It was not thought requisite to haue any Regard either in Rhyme or Equality of Measure, in the Lines of that Part of the Dialogue which was design'd for the Recitative Stile in Musick. For as that stile in Musick is not confin'd to the strict Observation of Time and Measure, which is requir'd in the Composition of Airs and Sonata's, so neither is it necessary that the same Exactness in Numbers, Rhymes, or Measure, should be observed in the Formation of Odes and Sonnets. For what they call Recitative in Musick, is only a more tuneable speaking, it is a kind of Prose in Musick; its Beauty consists in coming near Nature, and in improving the natural Accents of Words by more Pathetick or Emphatical Tones.

== Synopsis ==
=== Act I ===
Semele is about to be married against her will to Prince Athamus, though she loves the god Jupiter. Jupiter's thunder interrupts the ceremony, and Athamus finds himself left alone with Ino, Semele's sister. Ino is professing her love for Athamus when Cadmus enters to announce that Semele has been carried off to heaven by Jupiter in the form of an eagle.

=== Act 2 ===
Juno, jealous wife of Jupiter, has instructed her handmaid Iris to find out where Semele and her husband are. Iris says that they are in his palace, guarded by dragons. Within the palace, Jupiter and Semele sing of their mutual love but Semele is not satisfied, realising that as a mortal her happiness must be transitory. Jupiter attempts to divert her from such thoughts, and to provide entertainment arranges for Ino to visit her.

=== Act 3 ===
Juno, accompanied by Iris, visit the god Somnus and asks to borrow his magic rod to charm the dragons. She gets Somnus to put Ino to sleep so that she can take her place. Disguised as Ino, Juno falsely tells Semele that she has the opportunity to become immortal if only she can persuade Jupiter to appear before her as he truly is, in his natural godly state. When Semele and Jupiter are alone, Semele first secures from him a vow that he will do whatever she asks, and then she demands that he appear as a god. Jupiter warns her of her folly but is unable to persuade her to change her mind. He carries out the vow, appearing with his most gentle fire and lightning, but is unable to save her from being destroyed. In the final scene, Ino marries Athamus and Apollo prophesies that Bacchus, the unborn child of Jupiter and Semele, will rise from Semele's ashes.

== History ==
Eccles probably completed the score of Semele in late 1706, basing his music on a libretto of 1705–1706 by his close friend William Congreve. The opera may have been intended to open John Vanbrugh's new Queen's Theatre in The Haymarket in 1707, but that became impossible when the Lord Chancellor gave Vanbrugh's competitor Christopher Rich at the Theatre Royal, Drury Lane a monopoly on opera productions in London. Congreve and Eccles were forced to agree to a production at Drury Lane, but Rich never brought it to the stage. Congreve published his libretto in 1710, but Eccles's music remained unheard, with popular fashion turning towards the Italianate style of opera seria. Congreve's libretto was later re-used, in slightly amended form, by George Frideric Handel for his secular oratorio Semele.

Eccles' Semele forms part of the English opera tradition that had begun with Blow's Venus and Adonis (c1683) and included Purcell's Dido and Aeneas (c. 1685–1689). The non-performance of the opera in 1707 confirmed the end of this short-lived tradition. According to the New Grove Dictionary of Opera, Semele was 'in every way superior' to the other operas that were being performed in London at the time. The lack of productions in later years may owe something to the fact that modern directors have found Handel's setting of the same libretto so easy to turn into an opera.

== Performance ==
The earliest known productions of Eccles' music were:

- Oxford, Wadham College Music Society and Oxford University Opera Club, conducted by John Byrt, 19 August 1964.
- St John's, Smith Square, London, 22 April 1972.

On 26 November 2019 Cambridge Handel Opera Company, Academy of Ancient Music and Cambridge Early Music staged a concert performance in Trinity College, Cambridge, conducted by Julian Perkins. On 18 November 2023, American Baroque Opera performed Semele in Dallas.

== Recording ==
There is a 2004 recording on CD by Florida State University Opera conducted by Anthony Rooley, and a 2019 recording (published in January 2021), by the Academy of Ancient Music in partnership with the Cambridge Handel Opera Company, directed by Julian Perkins.

== See also ==
- Sémélé, a 1709 opera by Marin Marais on the same theme but based on a different libretto.
- Semele, a 1743 opera by Handel, based on the same libretto.
