= Amanda Eubanks Winkler =

American historian

- Born: Amanda Eubanks Winkler

Academic background
- Education: Illinois State University (B.M.); University of Michigan (M.A., Ph.D.)

Amanda Eubanks Winkler is a British-American scholar of English music and theater. She is Director of the Department of Music at Mason Gross School of the Arts, Rutgers University. Formerly she was Chair and Professor of Music History and Cultures in the Department of Art and Music Histories at Syracuse University College of Arts and Sciences. Between 2017–2020, she collaborated with the theater historian Richard Schoch on the AHRC Research Project Performing Restoration Shakespeare.

== Education ==
Eubanks Winkler completed a B.M. in music history and literature and vocal performance, summa cum laude, at Illinois State University in 1994. She earned a M.A. in musicology from University of Michigan in 1996 and a Ph.D. from the same institution in 2000.

== Career ==
Eubanks Winkler joined the faculty of Syracuse University College of Arts and Sciences in 2001. She moved to Rutgers in 2023. Her research focuses on English theater music and culture. She was the co-investigator on Performing Restoration Shakespeare, a project funded by the Arts and Humanities Research Council in the UK (2017-2020) and she is a general editor for The Collected Works of John Eccles (A-R Editions). She has published on a range of topics, including books and essays on Restoration theater music, music and Shakespeare, children's performances in early modern England, performance practice and contemporary Broadway musicals. More recently, she has engaged with practice-based research, running workshops that staged excerpts of William Davenant's Macbeth and Charles Gildon's Measure for Measure (Folger Theatre, Washington DC) and Thomas Middleton's The Witch (Blackfriars Conference, Staunton, Virginia). As part of the Performing Restoration Shakespeare project, she was the music director for a workshop of the Restoration-era Tempest (Sam Wanamaker Playhouse, Shakespeare's Globe, London) and co-led a workshop for scholars and was a consultant for a full professional production of Davenant's Macbeth at the Folger Theatre, Washington DC.

== Selected works ==
=== Books ===
- Eubanks Winkler, Amanda (2006). O Let Us Howle Some Heavy Note: Music for Witches, the Melancholic, and the Mad on the Seventeenth-Century English Stage. Indiana University Press. ISBN 978-0-253-34805-0.
- Austern, Linda Phyllis; Bailey, Candace; Eubanks Winkler, Amanda (2017). Beyond Boundaries: Rethinking Music Circulation in Early Modern England. Indiana University Press. ISBN 978-0-253-02497-8.
- Eubanks Winkler, Amanda (2020). Music, Dance, and Drama in Early Modern English Schools. Cambridge University Press. ISBN 978-1-108-85898-4.
- Eubanks Winkler, Amanda; Schoch, Richard (2021). Shakespeare in the Theatre: Sir William Davenant and the Duke's Company. Arden Shakespeare. Bloomsbury Academic. ISBN 9781350130579.
- Eubanks Winkler, Amanda; Fretz, Claude; Schoch Richard (2023). Performing Restoration Shakespeare. Cambridge University Press. ISBN 9781009241212.
