= 86 Semele =

Main-belt asteroid

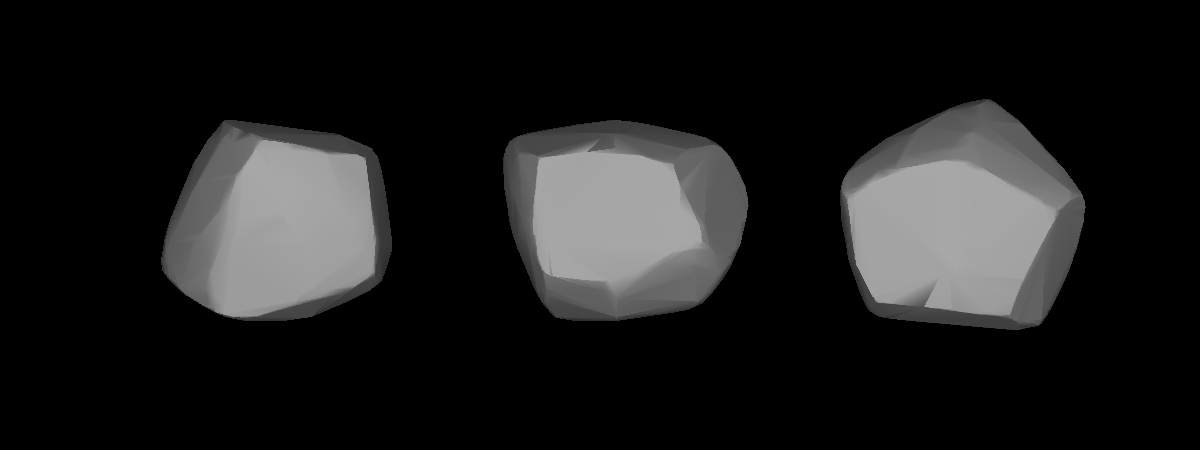
- Lightcurve-based 3D model of 86 Semele

Discovery
- Discovered by: Friedrich Tietjen
- Discovery date: 4 January 1866

Designations
- Pronunciation: /ˈsɛmɪlə/
- Named after: Semele
- Minor planet category: Main belt
- Adjectives: Semelean /sɛmɪˈleɪən/

Orbital characteristics
- Epoch 9 June 2026 (JD 2461200.5)
- Uncertainty parameter 0
- Aphelion: 3.7801 AU
- Perihelion: 2.4269 AU
- Semi-major axis: 3.1035 AU
- Eccentricity: 0.2180
- Orbital period (sidereal): 1,996.99 d (5.47 a)
- Average orbital speed: 16.69 km/s
- Mean anomaly: 100.203°
- Inclination: 4.8200°
- Longitude of ascending node: 86.042°
- Argument of perihelion: 308.721°
- T_{Jupiter}: 3.179

Physical characteristics
- Dimensions: 120.6 km
- Mass: (1.11±0.21)×10^{18} kg (Note: Calculated from its standard gravitational parameter GM = 0.074±0.014 km^{3}/s^{2}.)
- Mean density: 1.59 g/cm^{3} (Note: Assuming a diameter of 110 km.)
- Equatorial surface gravity: 0.0337 m/s²
- Equatorial escape velocity: 0.0638 km/s
- Synodic rotation period: 16.641±0.001 h
- Geometric albedo: 0.047
- Spectral type: C
- Absolute magnitude (H): 8.54

86 Semele is a large and very dark main-belt asteroid with an orbital period of 5.5 years. It is rotating with a period of 16.6 hours, and varies in magnitude by 0.13 during each cycle. This object is classified as a C-type asteroid and is probably composed of carbonates.

Semele was discovered by German astronomer Friedrich Tietjen on 4 January 1866. It was his first and only asteroid discovery. It is named after Semele, the mother of Dionysus in Greek mythology.

The orbit of 86 Semele places it in a 13:6 mean motion resonance with the planet Jupiter. The computed Lyapunov time for this asteroid is only 6,000 years, indicating that it occupies a chaotic orbit that will change randomly over time because of gravitational perturbations of the planets. This Lyapunov time is the second lowest among the first 100 named minor planets.
