= John Eccles (composer) =

English composer (1668–1735)

John Eccles (1668 – 12 January 1735) was an English composer.

Born in London, eldest son of professional musician Solomon Eccles and brother of fellow composer Henry Eccles, John Eccles was appointed to the King's Private Music in 1694, and in 1700 became Master of the King's Musick. In the latter year he finished second in a competition to write music for William Congreve's masque The Judgement of Paris (the winner was John Weldon).

Eccles was very active as a composer for the theatre, and from the 1690s wrote a large amount of incidental music including music for Congreve's Love for Love, John Dryden's The Spanish Friar and William Shakespeare's Macbeth. Jointly with Henry Purcell he wrote incidental music for Thomas d'Urfey's Don Quixote. He became a composer to Drury Lane theatre in 1693 and when some of the actors broke off to form their own company at Lincoln's Inn Fields in 1695, he composed music for them as well including for John Dennis's Rinaldo and Armida.

Eccles also wrote music for the coronation of Queen Anne and a number of songs. Many of his most famous songs, such as "I burn, I burn" were composed for the actress-singer Anne Bracegirdle to perform. Recognizing Eccles's ability to write for her needs, Mrs Bracegirdle, undoubtedly under his tutelage, thereafter sang only his music. Eccles also wrote an all-sung English opera Semele with text by Congreve, but it was not staged until the 20th century. Congreve's libretto would later serve as the basis for Handel's Semele (1744).

For much of the later part of his life, Eccles lived in Kingston upon Thames and wrote additional incidental music (though not as frequently as he had for Lincoln's Inn Fields) as well as the occasional court ode. He is reported to have spent much of his time fishing.

He was the only Master of the King's Musick in the history of the post to serve four monarchs (King William III, Queen Anne, King George I and King George II).

== Modern editions ==
Until recently Eccles's music has been largely unavailable. Now, however, a modern edition of the works of John Eccles is in progress under the general editorship of Michael Burden, Amanda Eubanks Winkler, Alan Howard and Kathryn Lowerre, and published by A-R Editions. The edition has produced Music for Macbeth edited by Amanda Eubanks Winkler; The Judgement of Paris edited by Eric Harbeson; Rinaldo and Armida edited by Steven Plank; Incidental Music Part 1 edited by Amanda Eubanks Winkler; and Europe's Revels for the Peace of Ryswick edited by Michael Burden.

Eccles's major opera, Semele, can be found in volume 76 of Musica Britannica, edited by Richard Platt.

Court offices
Preceded by Nicholas Staggins	Master of the King's Musick; 1700–1735	Succeeded by Maurice Greene
