= Semele (Schiller) =

Libretto by Friedrich Schiller

Semele (Semele. Eine lyrische Operette von zwei Szenen.) is a singspiel libretto by Friedrich Schiller, first published in the Musen-Almanach Anthologie auf das Jahr 1782. Schiller edited a pirated edition in 1800, but decided not to republish it. After his death, his friend and patron Christian Gottfried Körner published the revised edition in the fifth volume of the series Theater von Schiller, published by Cotta-Verlag.

Based on volume 3 of Ovid's Metamorphoses and set in a palace in Thebes, it begins with Juno (disguised as Semele's nurse Beroe) persuading the Theban king's daughter Semele to meet her lover Zeus. He gives in to Semele's wish to see his true form, but the sight destroys her.

== Plot ==
=== Scene 1 ===
Juno wants revenge on Semele, her husband Zeus' lover, and so takes the form of Semele's nurse Beroe. She argues that Semele should ask to see Zeus' true form to make sure he really is the father of the gods. Semele agrees and adds that Zeus mocks Juno's jealousy, mocking the gods and making fun of the seemingly-absent Hera.

=== Scene 2 ===
The amorous Zeus orders his son Hermes to send the Greeks a rich harvest as a reward for their offerings. Semele remains unsatisfied when he instead conjures up a rainbow and accelerates the change from day to night. She asks him for one wish, to be fulfilled unconditionally, to which he agrees, swearing by the river Styx. She states that her wish is to see his true form and he complies.

== Reception ==
Schiller himself rejected the work in a 1789 letter to his future wife Charlotte von Schiller, writing "It really frightened me that you mentioned Semele. May Apollo and his nine muses forgive me for sinning so grossly against them!". It was originally intended that Johann Rudolf Zumsteeg would set it to music but this never occurred. In Schillers Flucht von Stuttgart nach Mannheim und Aufenthalt in Mannheim von 1782-1785, Johann Andreas Streicher stated the work was unperformable due to theatre's technical difficulties.

Gustav Schwab argued that Schiller's decision to omit Semele from his complete works as a sign of aesthetic maturity. Karl Grün's Friedrich Schiller als Mensch, Geschichtschreiber, Denker und Dichter wrote of the work "The whole thing is definitely a freak, a Greek statue and a Schiller face grown together, inedible and deterring".

On the other hand, the biographer Peter-André Alt judged: “Even if the text is supported by a dramaturgically simple basic structure, it still has its artistic charm. Schiller succeeds in imprinting his own signature on the mythical material. [...] With Semele, the young Schiller has presented his first literary masterpiece, which pushes the other works in the anthology into the background. ” [5] Günter Oesterle sees Schiller's later rejection as being based on his turn to classical music. [6]

The work was finally set to music in 1887 by Franz Curti and premiered on 10 November 1900 at the Königliches Schauspielhaus Berlin, meeting with good reviews.

== Bibliography (in German) ==
=== Editions ===
- Friedrich Schiller: Theater von Schiller. Band 5. Cotta, 1807, S. 389–420.
- Friedrich Schiller: Semele. In: Schiller. Werke in drei Bänden. Bd.2. Hanser, München 1966, S. 1033–1052.

=== Secondary literature ===
- Ludwig Finscher: Was ist eine lyrische Operette? Anmerkungen zu Schillers "Semele". In: (ed.) Achim Aurnhammer: Schiller und die höfische Welt. Gruyter, Tübingen 1990, ISBN 3-484-10649-2, S. 152–155.
- Ingo Müller: Dramatische Intrige und musikalische Gegenwärtigkeit. Zur Frage der Intermedialität von Friedrich Schillers "lyrischer Operette" "Semele". In: (ed.) Wilfried Barner: Jahrbuch der Deutschen Schillergesellschaft. Internationales Organ für Neuere Deutsche Literatur. Band 57. Wallstein Verlag, Göttingen 2013, ISBN 978-3-8353-1322-4, S. 75–104.
- Günter Oesterle: Exaltationen der Natur. Friedrich Schillers "Semele" als Poetik tödlicher Ekstase. In: Georg Braungart (ed.): Schillers Natur, Leben, Denken und literarisches Schaffen. Meiner, Hamburg 2005, ISBN 3-7873-1770-8, S. 209–220.
- Karl Pestalozzi: Dichtung als verborgene Theologie im 18. Jahrhundert. Lavaters religiöses Drama "Abraham und Isaak" und Schillers Operette "Semele". Gruyter, Berlin 2012, ISBN 978-3-11-029448-4.
