= Semele (play) =

Lost Ancient Greek tragedy by Aeschylus

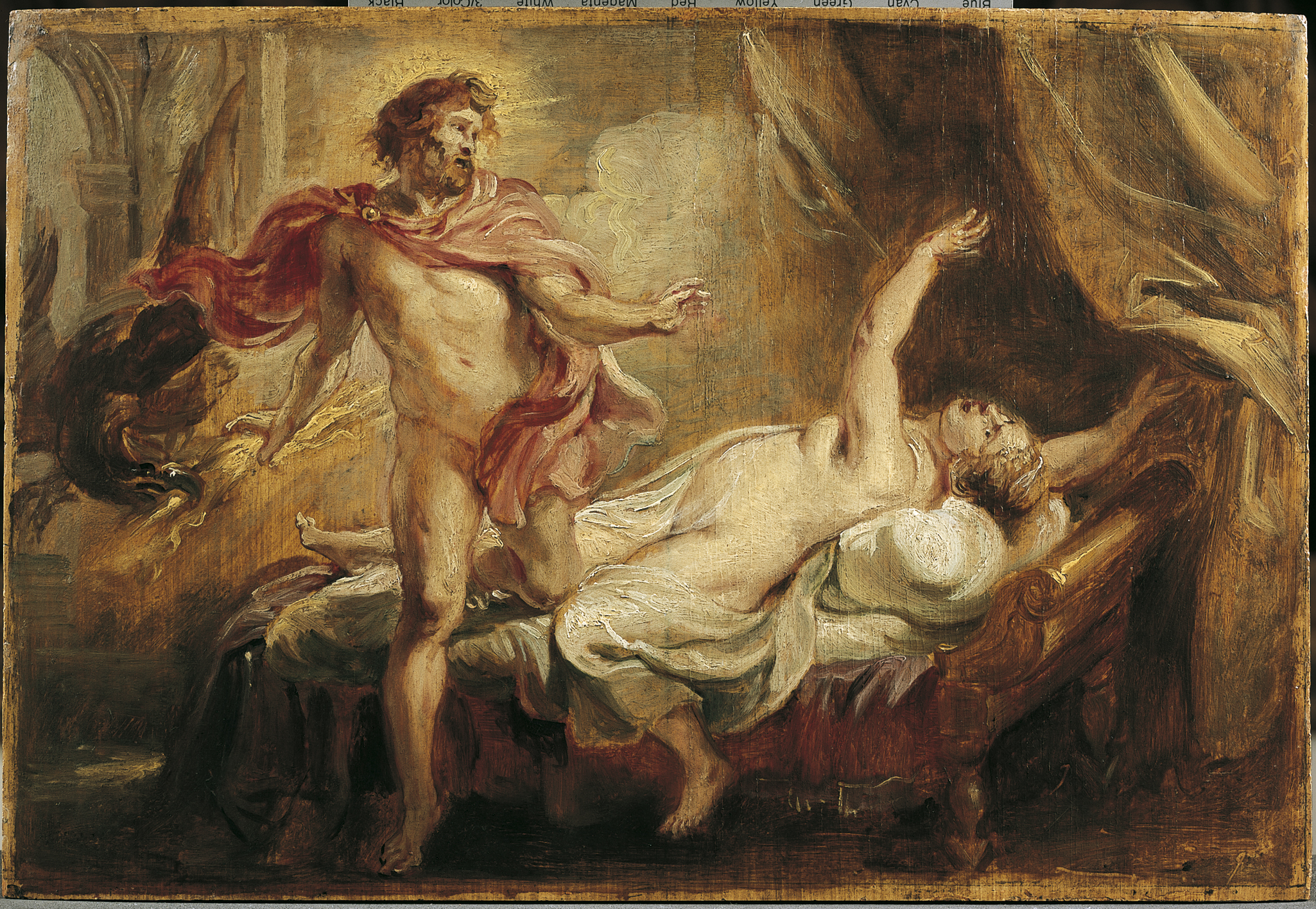
- Death of Semele by Paul Peter Rubens, before 1640, oil on panel
- Original language: Ancient Greek
- Written by: Aeschylus
- Chorus: Women of Thebes
- Characters: Semele; Hera; Nurse ? Semele's sisters ?
- Subject: Semele's death
- Genre: Greek tragedy
- Setting: Thebes, Greece

Premiere
- Date: c. 499–455 BC
- Place: Athens

Semele (Ancient Greek: Σεμέλη), also known by its alternative title The Water Carriers or Hydrophori (Ancient Greek: Ὑδροφόροι), is a lost ancient Greek tragedy by Aeschylus, an Athenian playwright of the early fifth century BC. Although lost except for some brief fragments, it is known that it dealt with the pregnancy of the Theban princess Semele, and Hera's trickery that led to Semele's fiery death at the hands of her lover Zeus.

Not enough fragments remain to construct the play's plot. Neither the date it premiered nor the festival it competed in can be inferred from the available testimonies. It is however notable for being the only confirmed tragedy in which Hera appeared. Semele was likely part of a typical Aeschylean tetralogy centering Dionysus, but it is hard to determine for sure which other plays were included in that tetralogy.

== Mythological background ==
In standard Greek myth, Semele is a daughter of the hero Cadmus and princess of Thebes, mother of Dionysus by the god Zeus. While still pregnant, Zeus's jealous wife Hera took revenge on Semele by making her question whether her lover was indeed Zeus, and goading her to ask from Zeus to appear in all his power in front of her as proof of his divinity and love. Semele was convinced and did so, but Zeus' lightning bolts burned her to a crisp. Zeus took the premature Dionysus and sewed him in his thigh so he could continue development.

== Fragments ==
Only few fragments remain from Semele, making the reconstruction of the play's structure and acts impossible. For years the only information available was from a scholium on Apollonius Rhodius which stated that Semele appeared on stage heavily pregnant and divinely possessed, and that the women who touched her belly became similarly possessed too. Those women would have made up the chorus of the play, the titular water-carriers, helping Semele through her pains and carrying bathwater for the labour as midwives. Dionysus' unusual birth however rendered the women of the chorus rather unnecessary. The god's birth must have been related in the play somehow due to the references to amphidromia, a household ritual for newborn infants.

The most substantial fragment of the drama was assigned in antiquity to a different Dionysian play by Aeschylus, the little-known Xantriae ("wool-carders"), though due to the difficulties it presents in regards to that play's plot which featured a grown-up Dionysus and likely the sparagmos of Pentheus, it has been suggested that it belonged to Semele instead. In it Hera appears disguised as her own priestess from Argos collecting offerings, the only surviving version where she uses this disguise. She makes a speech about the modesty of brides and the harshness nymphs (patronesses of marriage) should display to the ones who are not, apparently in an effort to make Semele and the chorus question the princess' honour in the case she lost her virginity to a mortal instead of a god, and now carries an out-of-wedlock mortal child, product of a sordid behaviour.

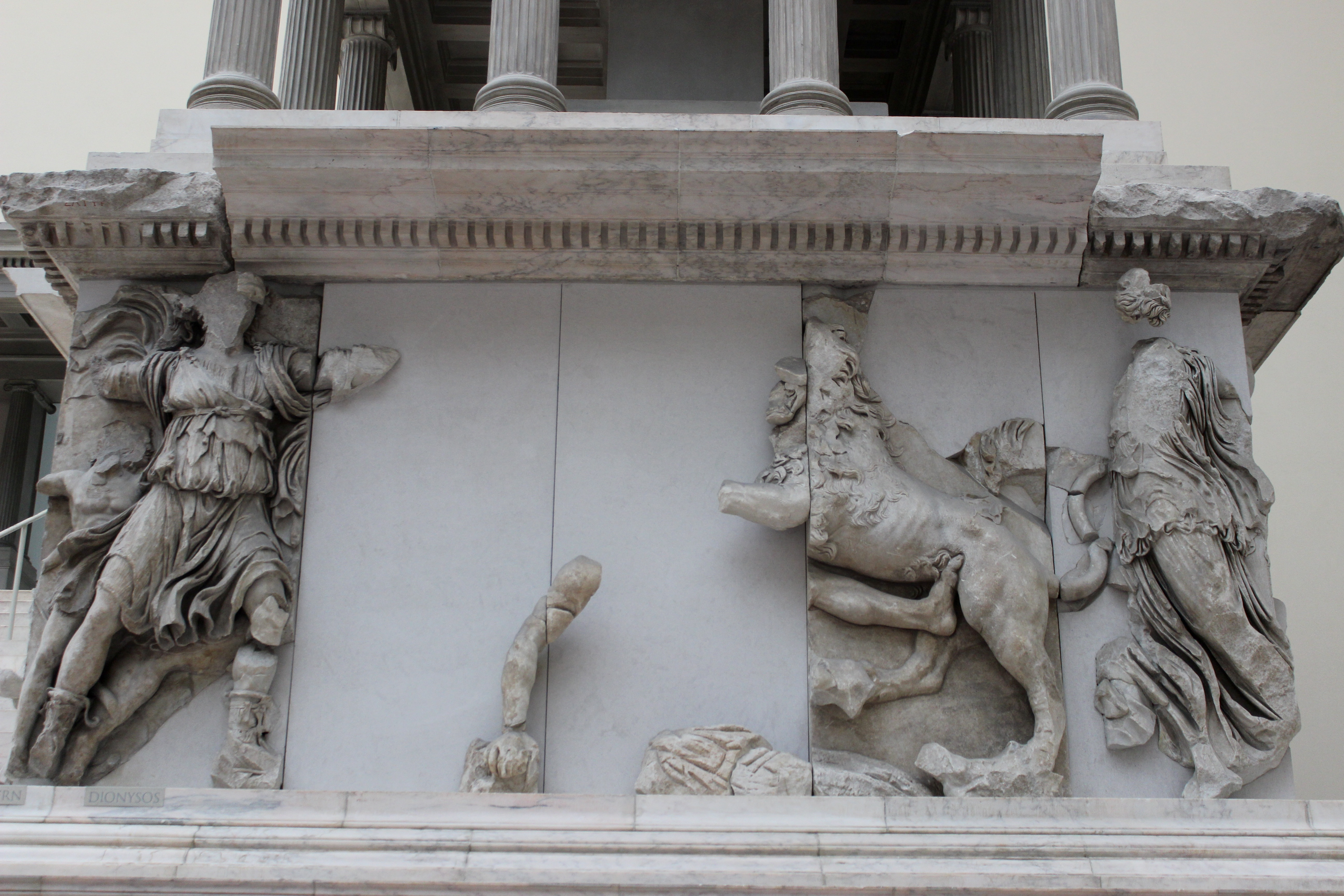
Semele with her son Dionysus on the Pergamon Altar, Berlin

It is not clear whether Hera and Semele directly met, or if the goddess only worked through middlemen such as the chorus or Semele's sisters. The chorus wishes that Semele "may always have a fortune that steers a straight path", and it is possible that the play included the element of Semele's sisters not believing her and spreading the rumour that she had been impregnated by a mere man, although this element is not clearly established until Euripides at least half a century—if not more—later. Jouan and Xanthaki-Karamanou suggested that in the play it was the sisters who, convinced by Hera, challenged Semele to prove her lover was a god indeed, and Semele did so, against the warnings of a devoted and sympathetic nurse; while her infant son was saved, the Thebans probably believed he too perished along with his mother. At any point, it is safe to say that Hera's words sowed enough doubt in Semele to seek reassurance from Zeus himself, with the rest of the play dealing with her self-destructive wish that ended with Semele burned to death by his bolts when he showed his true identity to her.

Another debate is when Hera first made her entrance, and whether she revealed her intentions to the characters as well as the audience so that they could follow the story. The most plausible moment for her to do so would be in the prologue before the chorus (which would be loyal to Semele) arrives, but prologues where a single character makes a monologue are rare in Aeschylus. If Hera revealed her scheme in the end, Aeschylus might had had her do so through an accomplice rather than present Hera in her true form on stage.

== Historical information ==
It is possible that Semele was part of a Dionysian tetralogy along with the non-surviving tragedies Pentheus, the Xantriae, and the satyr play Nurses, plays which it has long been connected with. Another possible play in the tetralogy is the entirely obscure Bacchae; Gantz suggested that the common hypothesis that Semele was the opener of this Dionysian tetralogy could be mistaken, and instead it was a stand-alone, its place in the group taken by the Bacchae. Alternatively the Toxotides (starring Actaeon, a man who fatally wooed Semele) is a likely candidate for a play that was produced together with Semele. This idea has been met with some criticism however. It is not clear what competition it entered, or what year it was produced; Aeschylus' own career began in 499 BC and ended with his death in 455 BC.

What is notable about this play is that it featured the goddess Hera on stage, the only confirmed tragedy to do so and unparalleled as far as we can tell judging from both surviving and fragmentary tragedies. Although several gods appeared in theatre as dei-ex-machina in order to give an end to conflict, it was almost a taboo to present Zeus and Hera themselves—apparently due to their high status as king and queen of the gods. It is also the first known example of a god's transformation in tragedy, and possibly served as the basis that later playwrights followed, such as Euripides, whose transformed Dionysus in The Bacchae is the sole surviving example of this pattern. The transformation for Hera's cunning and indirect involvement in Semele's death helped Aeschylus create a "tragedy without a victim"; Hera does not destroy Semele herself, rather she persuades her and leads her to commit hubris so that Semele will bring about her own demise when she asks for something that is forbidden for mortals, victim of her own actions.

== See also ==
- Broteas
- Niobe
- Lycurgeia

== Bibliography ==
- Gantz, Timothy (2007). "The Aischylean Tetralogy". In Lloyd, Michael A. (ed.). Oxford Readings in Aeschylus. Oxford: Oxford University Press. ISBN 978-0-19-926524-4.
- Hadjicosti, Ioanna L. (2006). "Hera Transformed on Stage Aeschylus Fr. 168 Radt". Varia. 19. Kernos. ISSN 0776-3824.
- Hathorn, Richmond Y. (1967). Crowell's Handbook to Classical Drama. NYC, United States: Thomas Y. Crowell Company. ISBN 0-690-22501-6.
- Heinze, Theodor (October 1, 2006). "Semele". In Cancik, Hubert; Schneider, Helmuth (eds.). Brill's New Pauly. Translated by Christine F. Salazar. Geneva: Brill Reference Online. ISSN 1574-9347.
- Jouan, François (1992). "Dionysos chez Eschyle" [Dionysus in Aeschulus]. Kernos (in French). 5. ISSN 0776-3824.
- Lloyd-Jones, Hugh, ed. (1963). Aeschylus. Loeb Classical Library. Vol. II. Translated by Herbert Weir Smyth (7th ed.). Harvard University Press.
- Patton, Kimberley Christine (2009). Religion of the Gods: Ritual, Paradox, and Reflexivity. Oxford: Oxford University Press. ISBN 978-0-19-509106-9.
- Radt, Stefan L. (1985). Tragicorum Graecorum Fragmenta (TrGF). Vol. 3: Aeschylus. Göttingen.
- Schmitz, Leonhard (1867). Smith, William (ed.). A Dictionary of Greek and Roman Biography and Mythology. London, UK: John Murray, printed by Spottiswoode and Co. Online version at the Perseus.tufts library.
- Sommerstein, Alan H. (2009). Aeschylus: Fragments. Loeb Classical Library 505. Cambridge, MA: Harvard University Press. ISBN 978-0-674-99629-8.
- Sommerstein, Alan H. (2023). "The Tetralogy". In Bromberg, Jacques A.; Burian, Peter (eds.). A Companion to Aeschylus. Wiley-Blackwell. ISBN 9781405188043.
- Wright, Matthew (2019). The Lost Plays of Greek Tragedy. Vol. 2: Aeschylus, Sophocles and Euripides. London, UK: Bloomsbury Academic. ISBN 978-1-4742-7646-7.
- Xanthaki-Karamanou, Georgia (March 2022). Montonari, Franco; Rengakos, Antonios (eds.). 'Dionysiac' Dialogues: Euripides' Bacchae, Aeschylus and Christus Patiens. De Gruyter. ISBN 9783110764345.
