= Aisonia =

Aisonia Αισωνία
- Municipal unit
- Location within the regional unit

- Location within Greece
- Coordinates: 39°21′N 22°53′E
- Country: Greece
- Administrative region: Thessaly
- Regional unit: Magnesia
- Municipality: Volos

Area
  - Municipal unit: 75.5 km^{2} (29.2 sq mi)
- Elevation: 62 m (203 ft)

Population (2021)
  - Municipal unit: 3,002
  - Municipal unit density: 39.8/km^{2} (103/sq mi)
- Time zone: UTC+2 (EET)
  - Summer (DST): UTC+3 (EEST)
- Postal code: 385 00
- Area code: 24210
- Vehicle registration: ΒΟ

Aisonia (Greek: Αισωνία) is a former municipality in Magnesia, Thessaly, Greece. Since the 2011 local government reform it is part of the municipality Volos, of which it is a municipal unit. The municipal unit has an area of 75.504 km^{2}. Population 3,249 (2011). The seat of the municipality was in Dimini. The name of the municipality comes from Aeson, king of ancient Iolcus.

== Subdivisions ==
The municipal unit Aisonia is subdivided into the following communities (constituent villages in brackets):

- Dimini (Dimini, Kakkavos, Paliouri)
- Sesklo (Sesklo, Chrysi Akti Panagias)

== Population ==
Historical population
Year	Pop.	±%
1991	2,897	—
2001	3,059	+5.6%
2011	3,249	+6.2%
2021	3,002	−7.6%
