= Dimini =

Dimini Διμήνι
- Community
- Location within Greece
- Coordinates: 39°21′N 22°53′E
- Country: Greece
- Administrative region: Thessaly
- Regional unit: Magnesia
- Municipality: Volos
- Municipal unit: Aisonia

Population (2021)
  - Community: 2,102
- Time zone: UTC+2 (EET)
  - Summer (DST): UTC+3 (EEST)

Dimini culture
- Period: Neolithic Europe
- Dates: circa 4800 BCE — circa 3200 BCE
- Preceded by: Sesklo culture
- Followed by: Eutresis culture

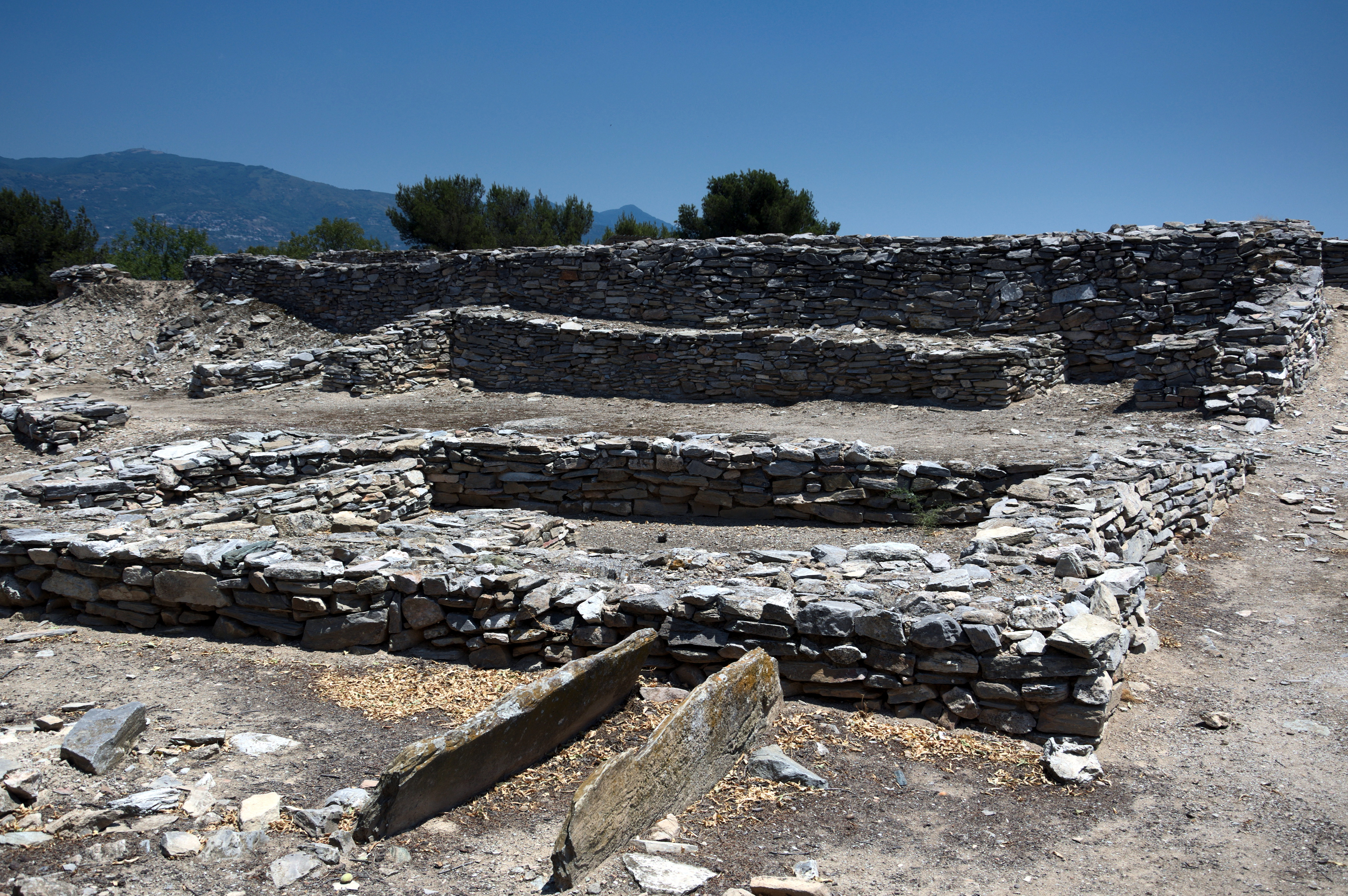
Dimini archaeological site.

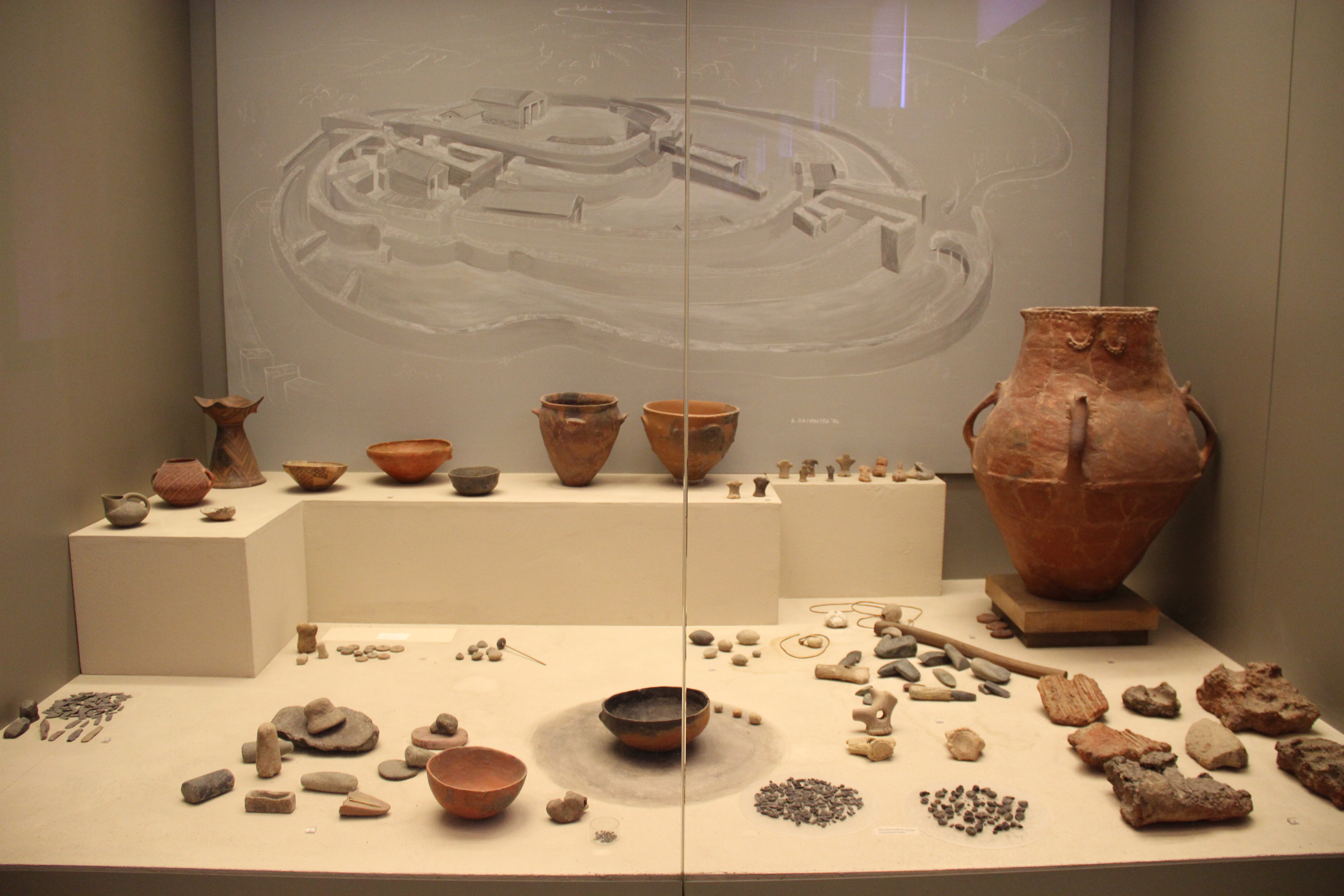
Neolithic artefacts and depiction of the Dimini walled settlement

Dimini (Greek: Διμήνι; older form Διμήνιον Diminion) is a village near the city of Volos, in Thessaly (central Greece), in Magnesia. It was the seat of the municipality of Aisonia. The name Aisonia dates back to ancient times. Currently, Dimini is the westernmost place in the Volos area. The Dimini area contains both a Mycenean settlement and a Neolithic settlement. The Neolithic settlement in Dimini was discovered near the end of the 19th century and was first excavated by the archaeologists Christos Tsountas and Valerios Stais.

The palace of ancient Iolcos is believed to be located in modern-day Dimini, where, in 2001, a Mycenaean palace was excavated.

== Population ==
Historical population
Year	Pop.	±%
1981	1,608	—
1991	1,956	+21.6%
2001	2,149	+9.9%
2011	2,279	+6.0%
2021	2,102	−7.8%

== History ==
=== Neolithic ===
Dimini culture is well known for its abstract painted vessels. Dimini ware is characteristic of the Later Neolithic period in eastern Thessaly, although it was traded and imitated outside the region and has been identified as far away as Cakran in Albania.

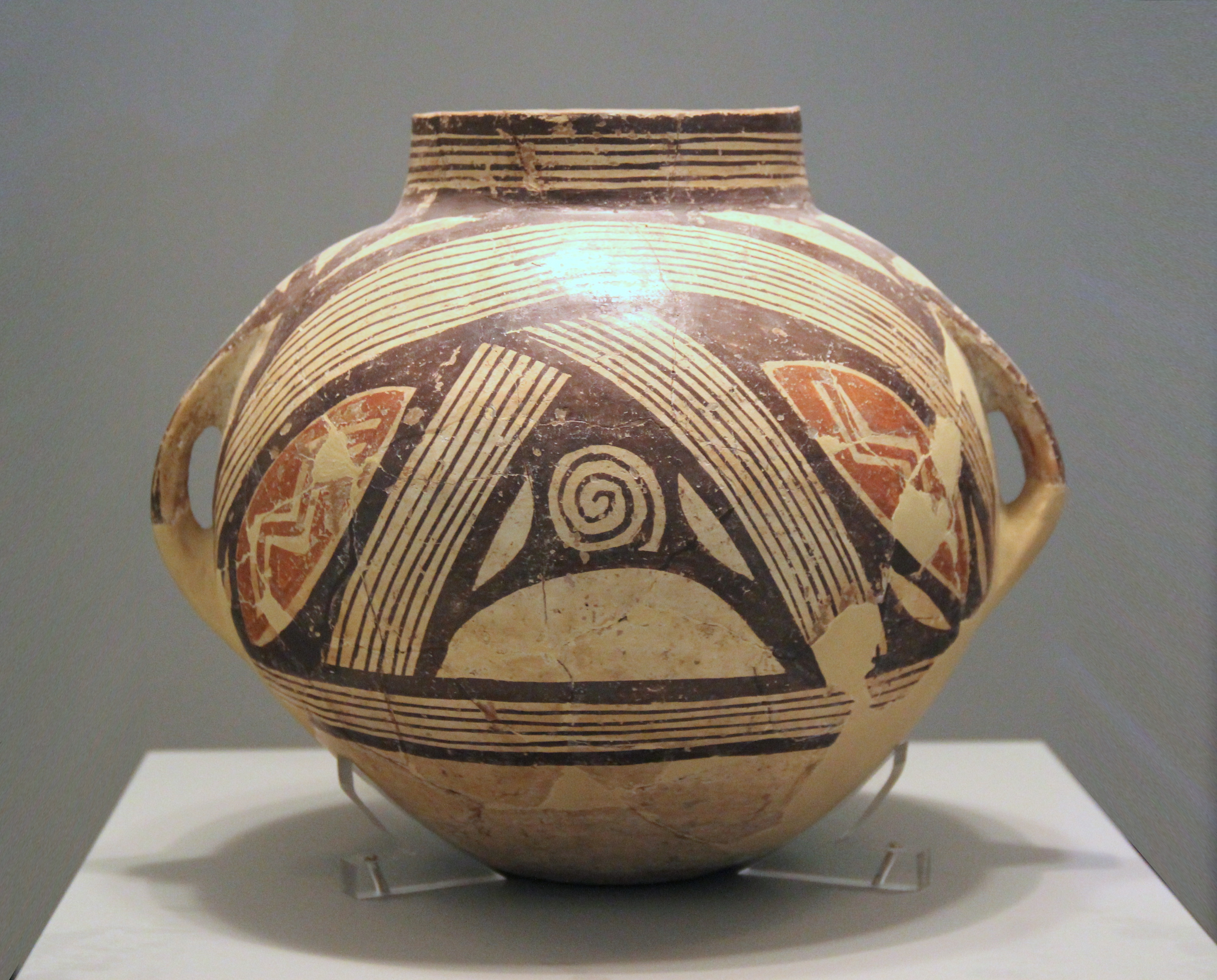
Clay vase with polychrome decoration, Dimini, Magnesia, Late or Final Neolithic (5300-3300 BC). Ceramic; height: 25 cm (9 3/4 in.), diameter at rim: 12 cm (4 3/4 in.); National Archaeological Museum (Athens)

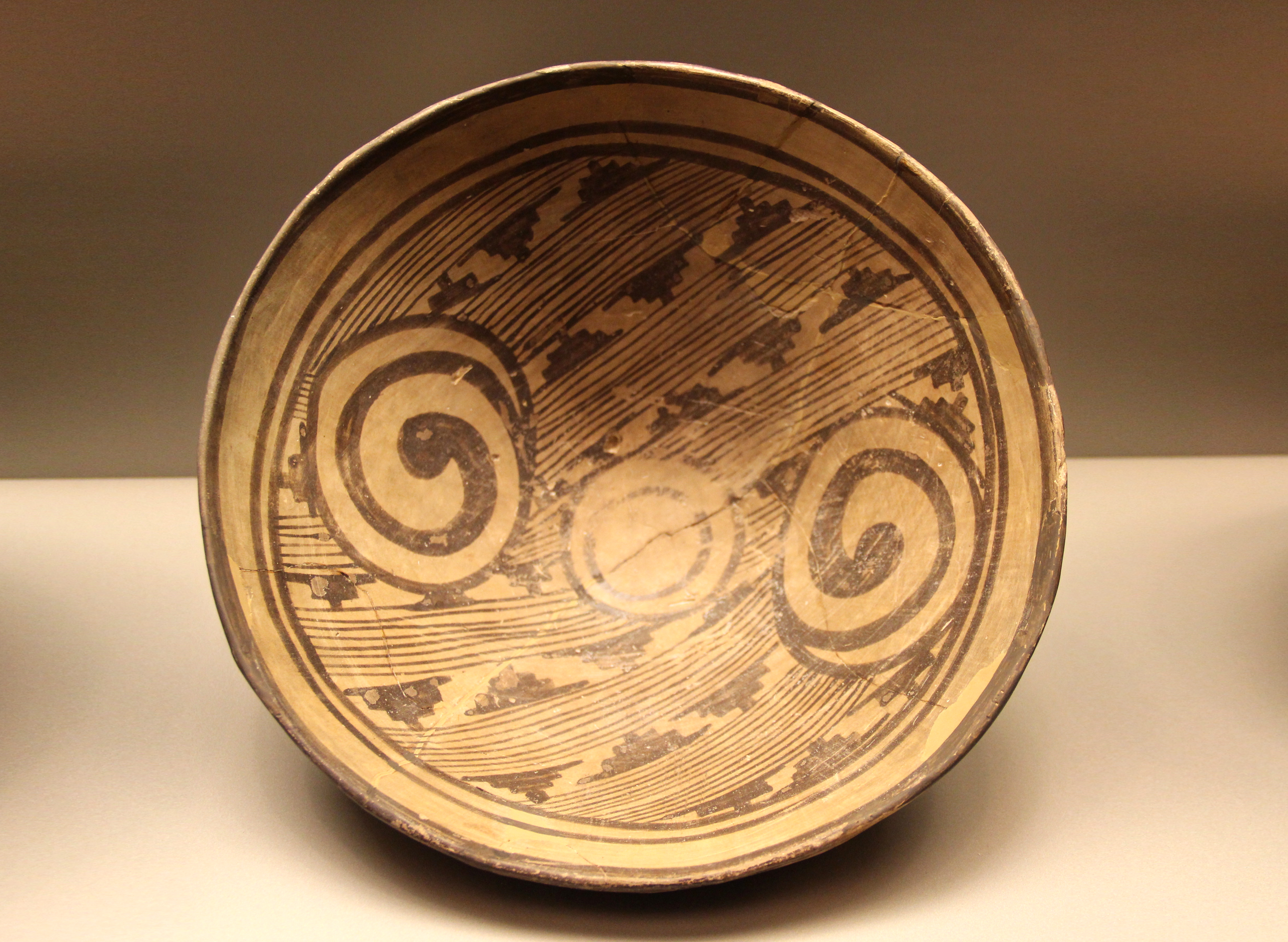
Dimini plate, National Archaeological Museum (Athens)

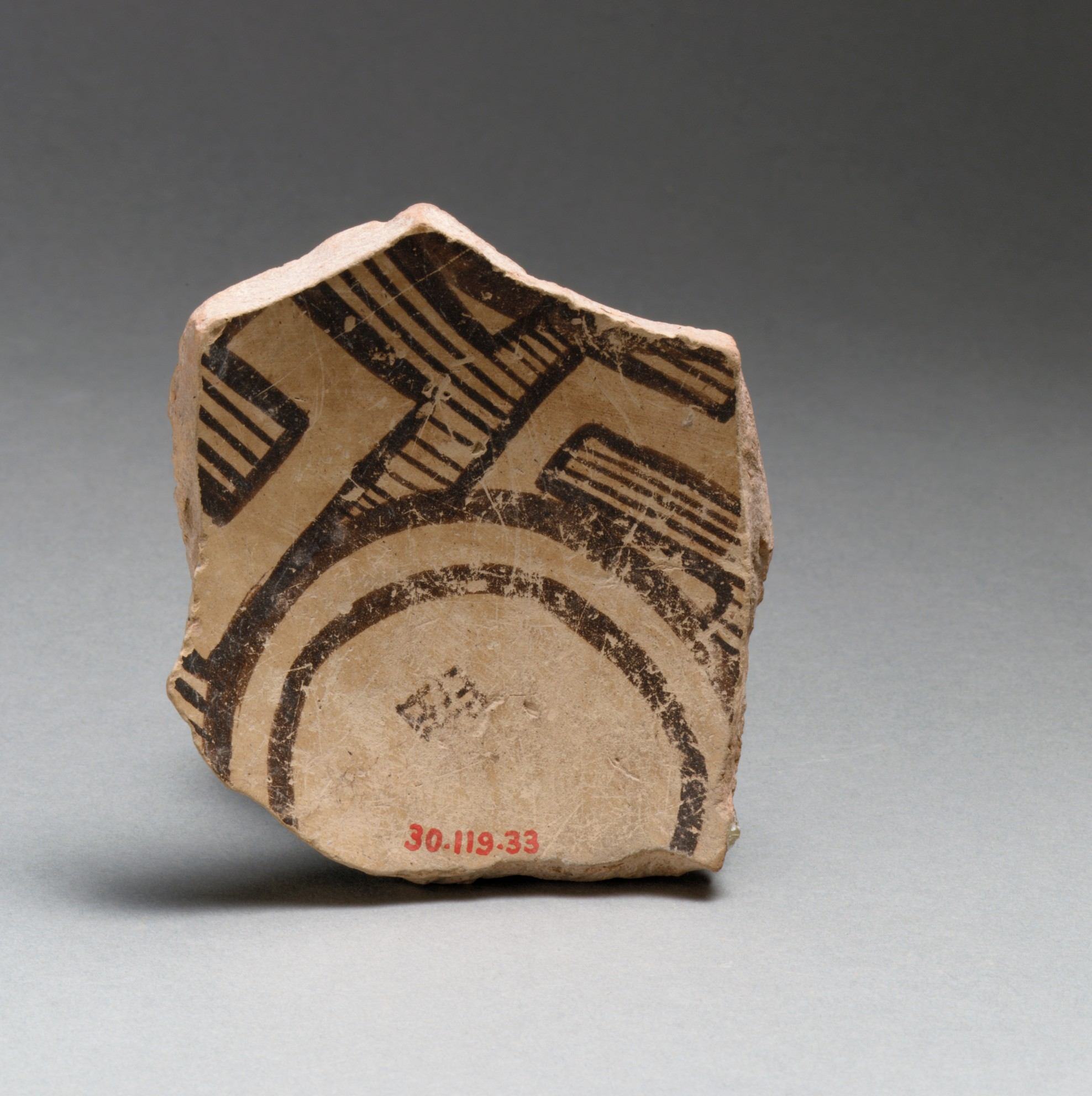
Terracotta base and lower body of a vessel; 3800-3300 BC; terracotta; length: 7.5 cm (2 15/16 in.); Metropolitan Museum of Art (New York City)

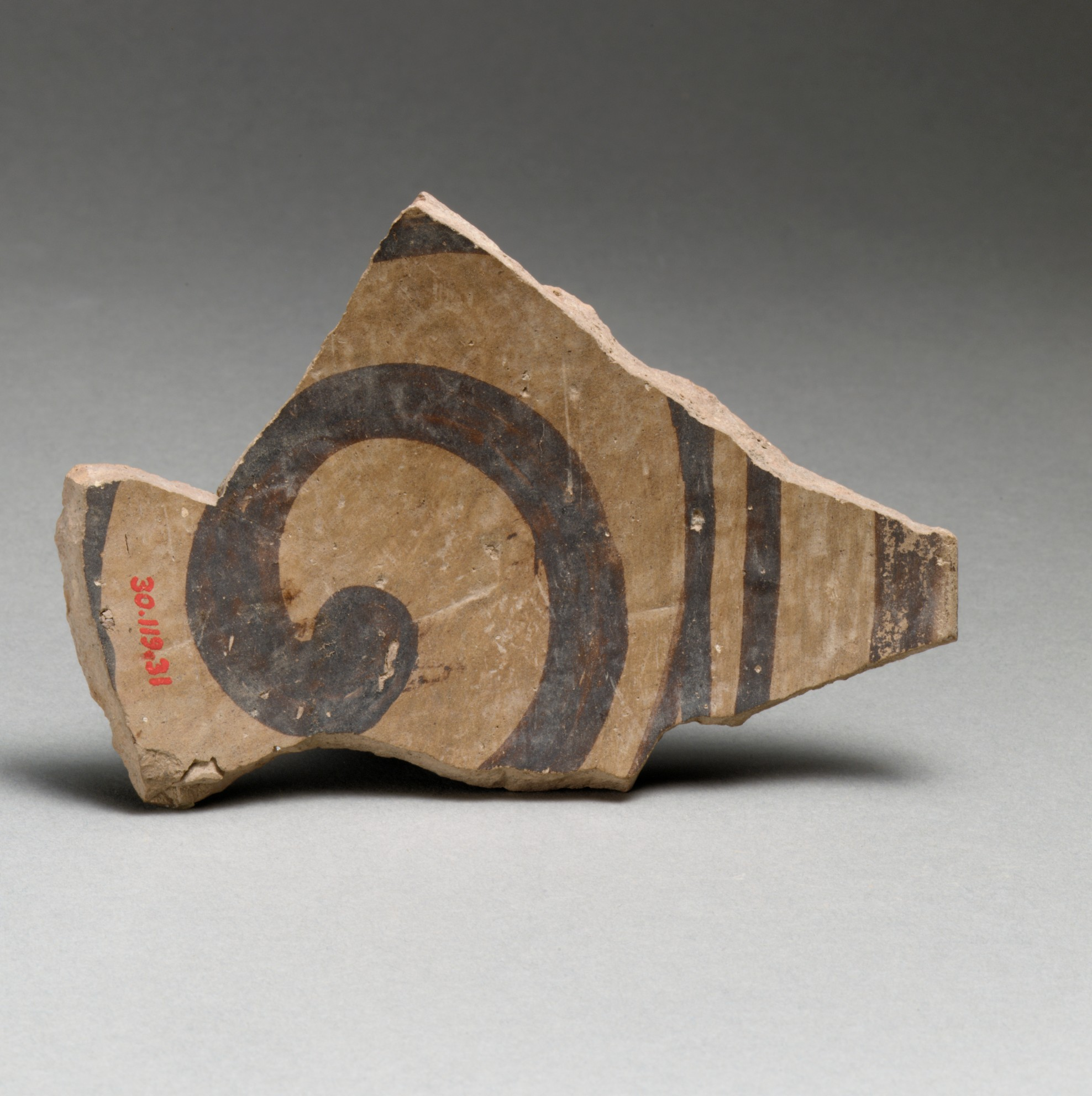
Terracotta rim fragment with latticework design; 3800-3300 BC; terracotta; length: 10.6 cm (4 3/16 in.); Metropolitan Museum of Art

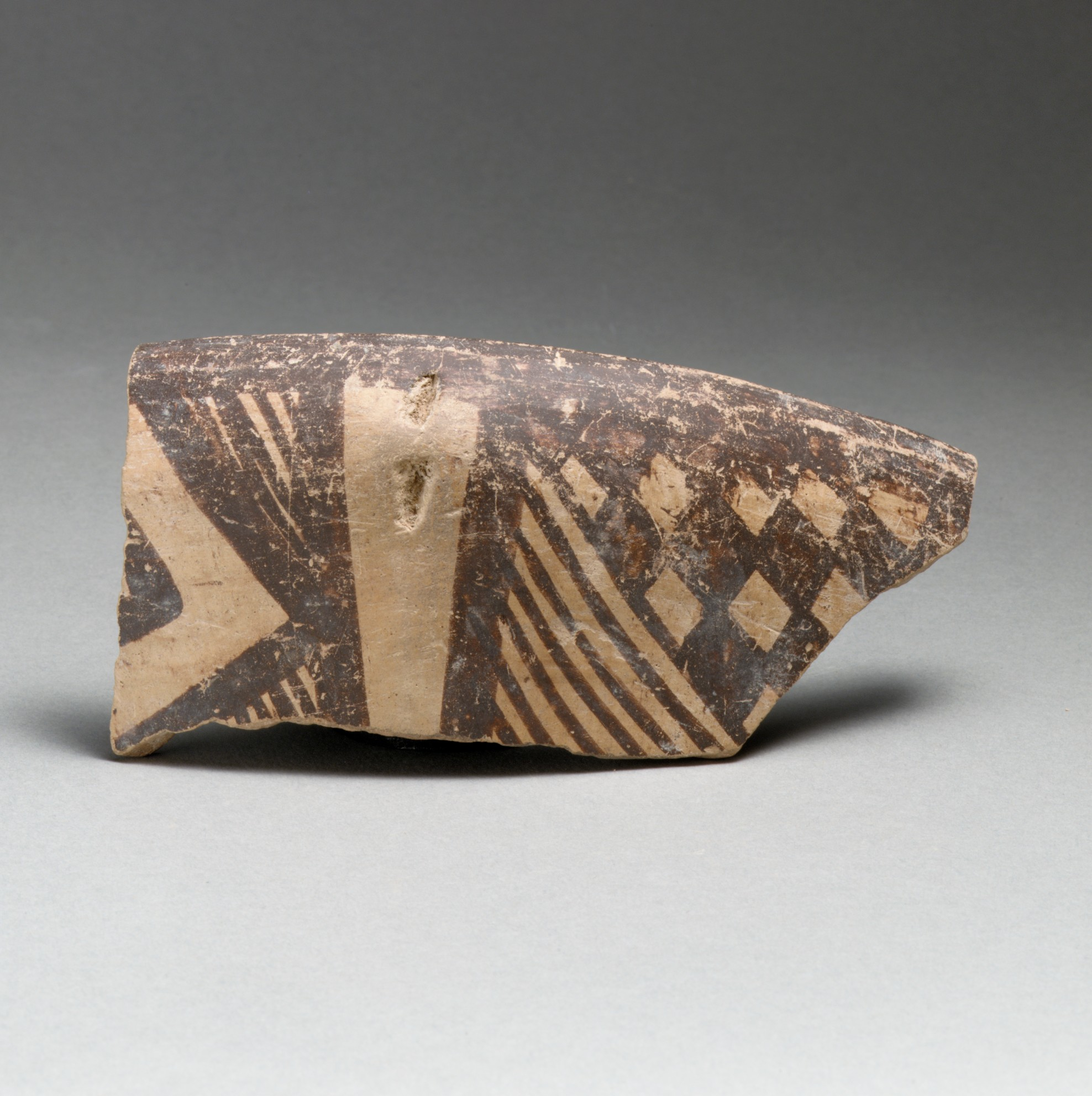
Terracotta rim of a bowl; 3800-3300 BC; terracotta; length: 12.8 cm (5 1/16 in.); Metropolitan Museum of Art

=== Antiquity ===
In 1886, Lolling and Wolters excavated the Mycenean tholos tomb known as Lamiospito. In 1901, Valerios Stais discovered the tholos tomb on the hill of the Neolithic settlement. He worked at the Dimini settlement with Christos Tsountas from 1901 up until 1903. In 1977, George Chourmouziadis continued excavations at the Neolithic settlement. Excavations of the Mycenean settlement in Dimini began in 1980 by V. Adrimi-Sismani. In 2001 the excavations uncovered a Mycenaean city and palace complex they believe could be part of ancient Iolkos. A stone weight and a sherd inscribed with Linear B writing were also uncovered. (Note: The publication of the results can be found here.)

The "invasion theory" states that the people of the Neolithic Dimini culture were responsible for the violent conquest of the Sesklo culture at around 5000 BC. Moreover, the theory considers the "Diminians" and the "Seskloans" as two separate cultural entities. However, I. Lyritzis provides a different story pertaining to the relations between the Dimini and the Sesklo cultures. He, along with R. Galloway, compared ceramic materials from both Sesklo and Dimini utilizing thermoluminescence dating methods. He discovered that the inhabitants of the settlement in Dimini appeared around 4800 BC, four centuries before the fall of the Sesklo civilization (ca. 4400 BC). Lyritzis concluded that the "Seskloans" and "Diminians" coexisted for a period of time.

== See also ==
- Boian culture
- Butmir Culture
- Cucuteni–Trypillia culture
- Funnelbeaker culture
- Gumelniţa–Karanovo culture
- Hamangia culture
- Karanovo culture
- Lengyel culture
- Linear Pottery culture
- Sesklo culture
- Starčevo culture
- Tisza culture
- Varna culture
- Vinča culture
- Helladic chronology
- Mycenaean Greece
- Neolithic Greece
- Old Europe
- Sesklo and Dimini fortifications

== Notes and references ==
Notes
