= Sesklo and Dimini fortifications =

Thessaly region in modern Greece

Sesklo and Dimini are two of the main sites of the Greek Neolithic Period, ca. 6000-3000 BCE. They are located only a few miles apart in the Thessaly region of Greece and were excavated between 1899 and 1906 by Christos Tsountas. Both settlements included a large central megaron building surrounded by smaller buildings and houses, as well as enclosing walls. The purpose of these walls has long been debated, with Tsountas initially claiming that they had defensive military purposes. However, over time more and more archaeologists have concluded that they instead functioned as retaining walls, to mark habitation spaces, as animal enclosures, or were used for ritual purposes. Regardless of their intended purpose, the fortifications reinforced the distinction between the inner settlement and outside world.

== Site locations ==
=== Sesklo ===
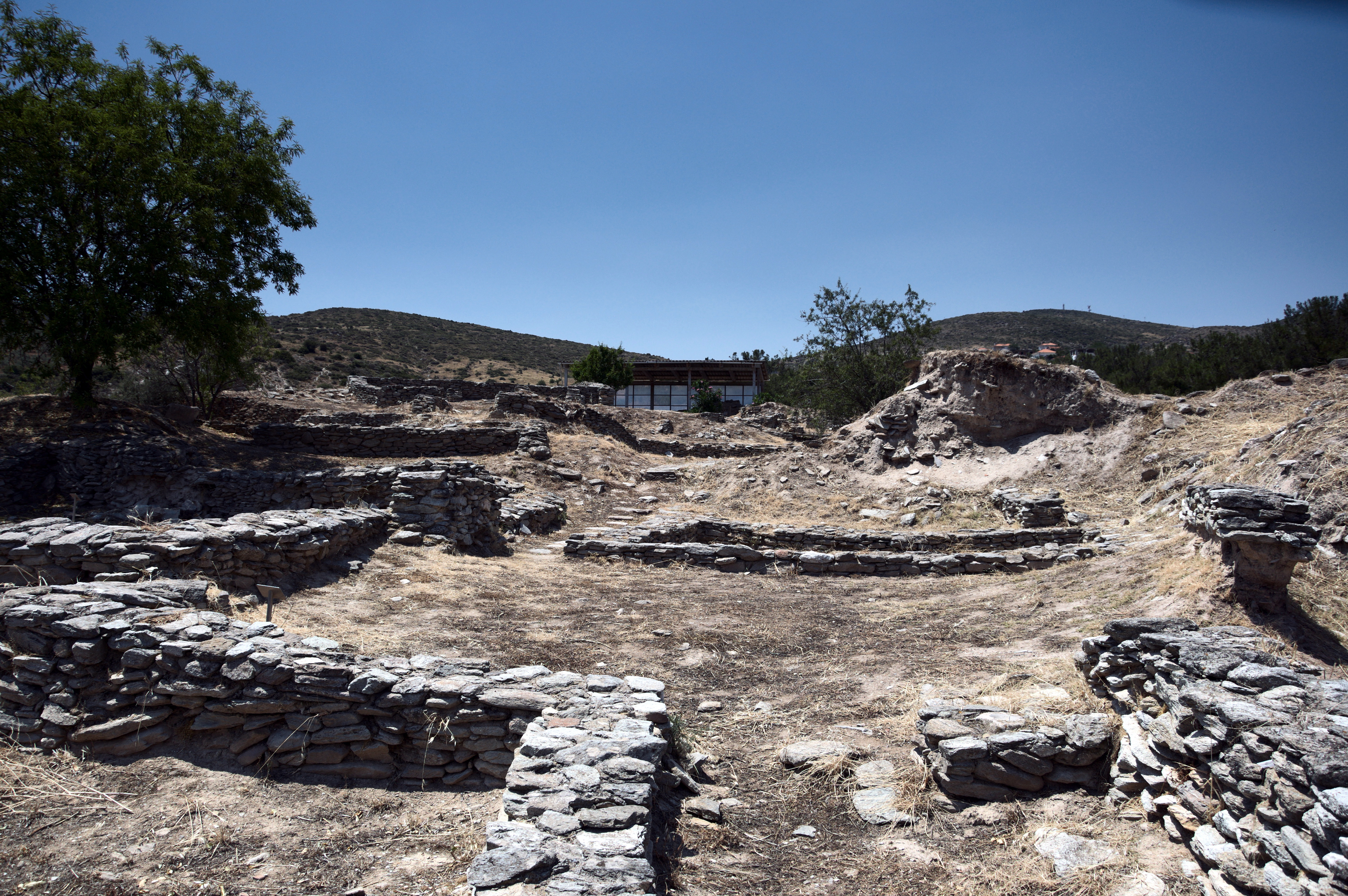
Remaining foundations at Sesklo

The Sesklo (Greek: Σέσκλο) settlement consists of three main phases. In general, there were close houses centered around a larger megaron with a paved courtyard. The early settlement had an unusually thick wall on the east side, but the middle to late settlements are of greater interest when considering Neolithic fortifications. Sesklo's stone walls enclosed parts of the acropolis and were approximately one meter in width. There is a possibility that they were capped with structures to create a taller barrier, but this is uncertain.

=== Dimini ===
The Dimini (Διμήνι) settlement was approximately 5,000 square metres (54,000 sq ft) and included a megaron in an oval courtyard with smaller buildings and houses outside of the fortifications. This site flourished during the late Neolithic period and used many of the same construction methods employed earlier at Sesklo, including stone walls. The Dimini fortifications were composed of 6 or 7 concentric circle walls that were 2–3 meters tall and as close as 1 meter apart. They were also likely made taller with mud brick or wooden palisades.

== Defensive fortifications ==
=== Protection ===
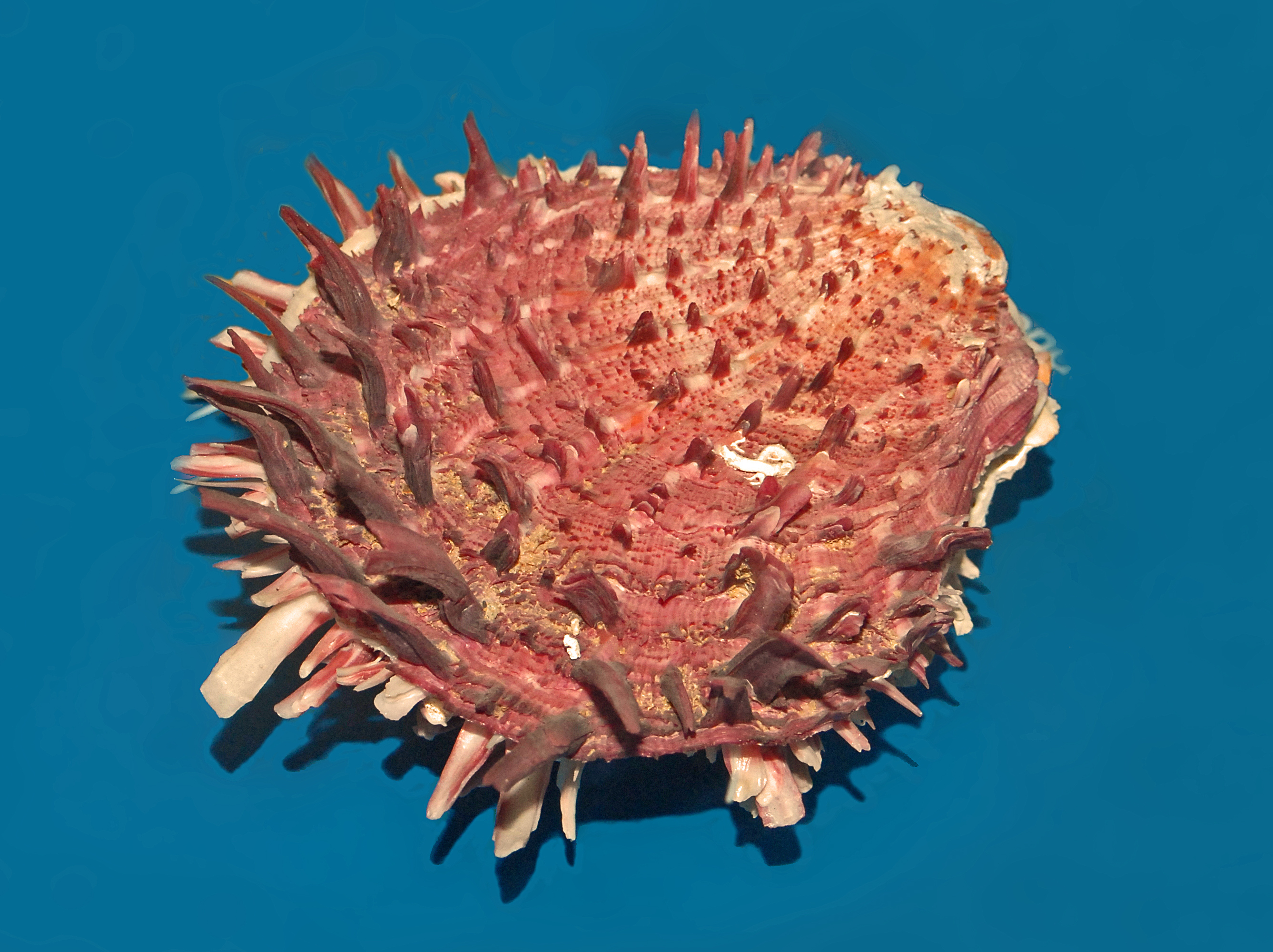
Valuable oyster shell used by the Dimini settlement

Building a wall alone has been said to be a statement about the capabilities and level of preparedness of the settlement to defend itself at the very least. The decision to build them also expresses a lack of trust that Sesklo and Dimini may have had in each other or in other Neolithic sites. These settlements felt some need to consolidate and protect themselves, indicating at least some apprehension. Further, Dimini was largely in control of production and exchange of an exotic and valuable type of oyster shell, which was used in creating personal ornaments like rings, beads, and buttons. It was generally limited to the few elites and functioned as an expression of status. Fortifications would have protected this valuable asset. Various types of weapons have been found at Sesklo, including stone projectile points, clay and stone sling bullets, axes, and knives. If these weapons were used in a warfare context, fortified sites would have provided necessary defense and protection. Note, however, that many of these weapons could have had alternative purposes, including hunting.

=== Construction ===
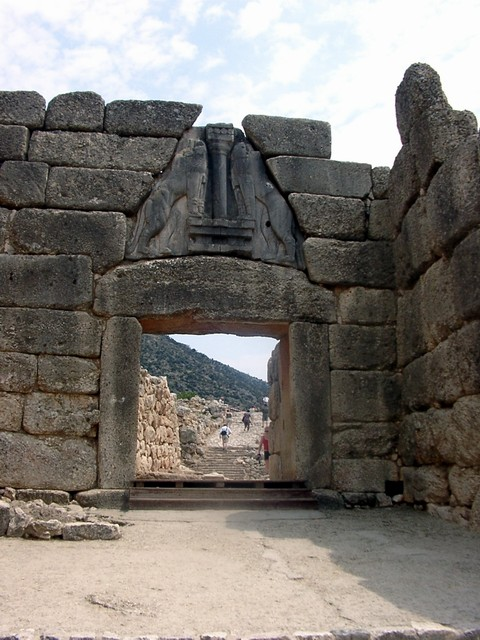
The Lion Gate at Mycenae, which serves a similar function as the baffle gates at Sesklo and Dimini.

Other Neolithic sites in Europe built structures using the same construction methods where a military function has been argued for very convincingly, including Makriyalos in Pieria, Strofilas on Andros Island, and in northeast Bulgaria. It is unlikely that Sesklo and Dimini would have used the same mechanisms for entirely different purposes. Large empty areas of land act as buffer zone to separate settlements at war and expose invaders as they cross them to approach an opposing settlement, giving defenders the opportunity to prepare. The presence of such no man's lands in Thessaly indicates that there may have been conflict and a need for defensive fortifications. The walls at both settlements included baffle gates, a classic characteristic of other fortified sites during this time period in Greece. This feature forces invaders to expose their flanks by requiring them to turn left, exposing their unshielded right side. Sesklo had one such gate on the western side, which was not protected by the steep ravine located on the eastern side of the settlement. Dimini had 4 or 5 of these gates, as well as other narrow openings into living and working areas, which are easy to defend, would slow down and confuse invaders, and give inhabitants multiple exits.

=== Destruction ===
The remains at Sesklo indicate extensive burning and destruction, serving as significant evidence for conflict. There is information to suggest that Dimini may be to blame for the destruction at Sesklo. However, it is also important to note that the burning could have been due to other causes, including the use of flammable building materials.

== Alternative functions ==
Upon further investigation, many archaeologists have determined there are many other likely uses for the walls found at Sesklo and Dimini. These functions include symbolic features for ritual purposes, markers of habituation spaces, animal enclosures, and organization of space within the settlement. Given the implications of building a wall, it is possible that they were meant to discourage attacks in the first place rather than to actually act as a protective measure in the midst of physical conflict. Upon later re-excavation of Dimini, no evidence of superstructures capping the walls was found, which could indicate they were not defensive in nature or they could be absent simply due to erosion. Excavators believed that fortifications implied significant social stratification, which may not have been significantly present at Dimini, suggesting the walls were used for organizing space instead. Finally, microclimates within the Thessaly region cause a fluctuation in agricultural success, making conflict dangerous and unnecessary. Some scholars argue that this promotes sharing, negotiation, and mitigation of conflict, making it unlikely that the walls at Sesklo and Dimini had military purposes.
