= Mopsus (disambiguation) =

Mopsus, in ancient Greece, was the name of three mythological figures, and possibly one historic person, including:

- Mopsus (son of Manto), son of Manto (daughter of Tiresias) and of either Rhacius of Caria or Apollo
- Mopsus (Argonaut), son of Ampyx and a nymph

Mopsus may also refer to:

- Mopsus (city), or Mopsuestia, an ancient city in Cilicia Campestris
- Mopsus (spider), an Australian spider genus
