= Magarsa =

Town in ancient Cilicia

Coordinates: 36°32′39″N 35°20′46″E

Magarsa (Ancient Greek: Μάγαρσα), or Magarsus or Magarsos (Μάγαρσος), or Megarsus or Megarsos (Μέγαρσος), was a town in the eastern part of ancient Cilicia, situated on a height close to the mouth of the river Pyramus. Alexander the Great, previous to the Battle of Issus, marched from Soli to Megarsus, and there offered sacrifices to Athena Megarsis, and to Amphilochus, the son of Amphiaraus, the reputed founder of the place. It seems to have formed the port of Mallus. It was later re-founded and renamed in Hellenistic times as Antiochia ad Pyramum (Antioch on the Pyramus).

Strabo writes that during his time the tombs of Amphilochus and Mopsus were in Magarsa.

Its site is located near Dörtdirek, Karataş, in Asiatic Turkey.
