= Mopsus (son of Manto) =

Greek mythological figure

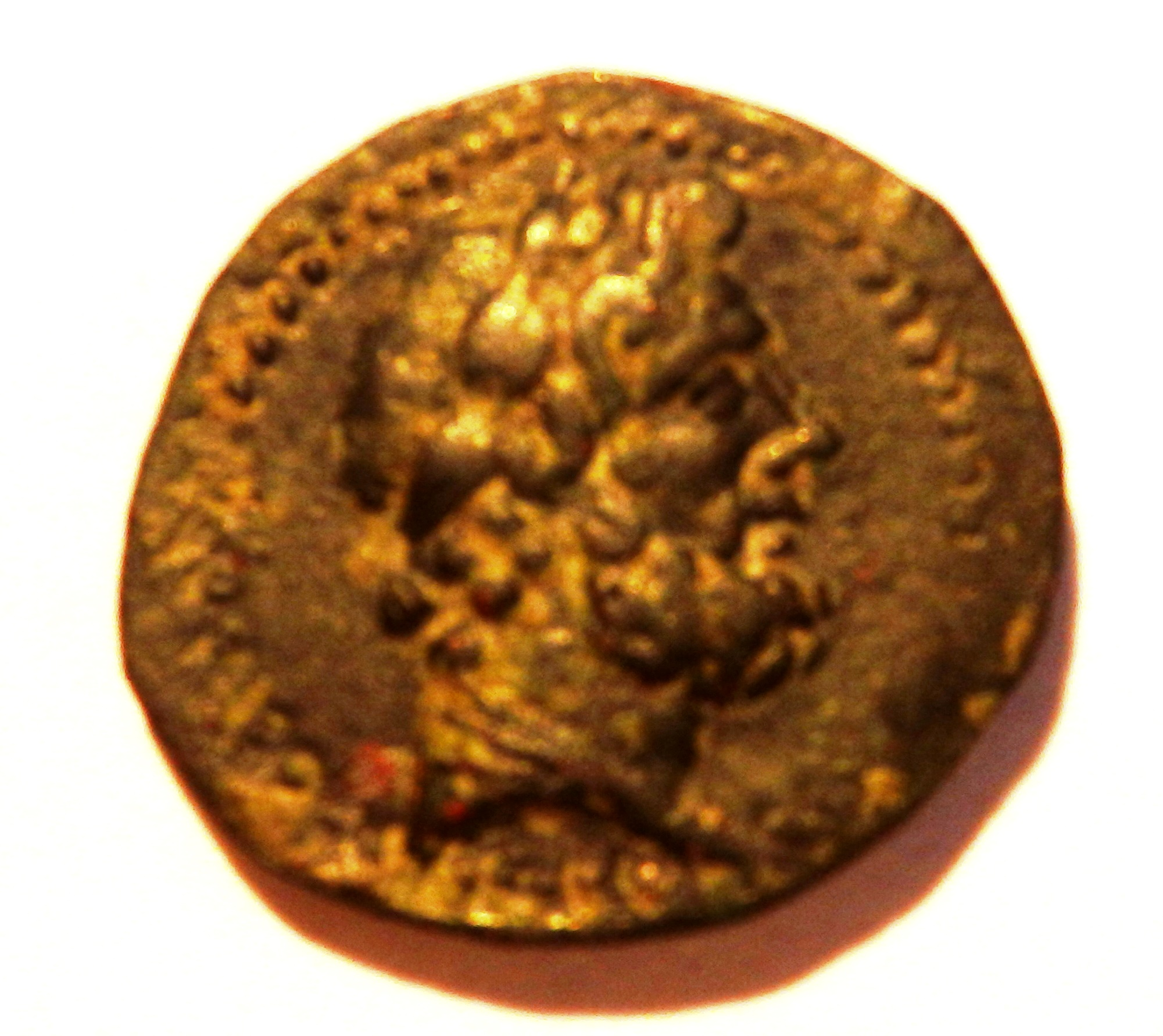

In Greek mythology, Mopsus, a celebrated seer and diviner, was the son of Manto, daughter of the mythic seer Tiresias, and of Rhacius of Caria or of Apollo himself, the oracular god. Greeks of the Classical age accepted Mopsus as a historical figure, though the anecdotes concerning him bridge legend and myth.

== Mythology ==
Mopsus (and perhaps a tradition of his heirs, like the Melampodidae, the Iamidae from Olympia or the Eumolpidae at Eleusis) officiated at the altars of Apollo at Klaros, which he founded; at Klaros the tradition was that he had been the son of a daughter of the seer Teiresias named Manto, literally "seeress". His unerring wisdom and discernment gave rise to the ancient Greek proverb, "more certain than Mopsus". He distinguished himself at the siege of Thebes; but he was held in particular veneration at the court of Amphilochus at Colophon on the Ionian coast of Asia Minor, adjacent to Caria.

The 12th century Byzantine mythographer John Tzetzes reports anecdotes of the prowess of Mopsus. Having been consulted, on one occasion, by Amphilochus, who wished to know what success would attend his arms in a war which he was going to undertake, he predicted the greatest calamities; but Calchas, who had been the soothsayer of the Greeks during the Trojan War, promised the greatest successes. Amphilochus followed the opinion of Calchas, but the prediction of Mopsus was fully verified. This had such an effect upon Calchas that he died soon after. His death is attributed by sources used by John Tzetzes to another mortification of the same nature: in this case, the two soothsayers, jealous of each other's fame, came to a different trial of their skill in divination. Calchas first asked his antagonist how many figs a neighboring tree bore; ten thousand and one, replied Mopsus. The figs were gathered, and his answer was found to be true. Mopsus now, to try his adversary, asked him how many young ones a certain pregnant sow would bring forth, and at what time. Calchas confessed his inability to answer, whereupon Mopsus declared that she would be delivered on the morrow, and would bring forth ten young ones, of which only one would be a male. The morrow proved the veracity of his prediction, and Calchas died through the grief which his defeat produced. Amphilochus subsequently having occasion to visit Argos, entrusted the sovereign power to Mopsus, to keep it for him during the space of a year. On his return, however, Mopsus refused to restore to him the kingdom, whereupon, having quarreled, they engaged and slew each other. According to another legend reported by Tzetzes, he was slain by Herakles.

Mopsus was venerated as founder in several cities of Pamphylia and the Cilician plain, among them Mopsuestia, "the house (hestia) of Mopsus" in Cilicia, and Mallos, where he quarreled with his co-founder Amphilochus and both were buried in tumuli, from which neither could see that of the other. At Mopsucrene, the "spring of Mopsus", he had an oracular site.

A bilingual (Hittite–Phoenician) inscription and a Hittitic tablet found in Turkey are independent non-Greek sources on Mopsos and the migration of Greeks in Asia Minor. According to these sources, the actions of Mopsos can be dated to 1245–1230 BC.
