= The Infernal Marriage =

1834 novel by Benjamin Disraeli

- Book cover for The Infernal Marriage (1929 edition)
- Author: Benjamin Disraeli
- Language: English
- Publisher: Bulwer
- Publication date: 1834
- Media type: Print

The Infernal Marriage is the eighth novel written by Benjamin Disraeli who would later become Prime Minister of Great Britain.

The novel is set in the Greek underworld. It depicts the marriage of the Roman deities Pluto and Proserpine. It includes a journey to Elysium and a discussion with the deposed Titans. Disraeli patterned the various gods of the narrative on political figures of his era, including George IV, Lord Byron, Charles Maurice de Talleyrand-Périgord, Princess Dorothea of Courland, Charles X of France, F. J. Robinson, 1st Viscount Goderich, Robert Peel, Arthur Wellesley, 1st Duke of Wellington, and John Copley, 1st Baron Lyndhurst.

== Background ==
The Infernal Marriage appeared in a series of editions of the New Monthly Magazine published from July to October 1834. Its story was never concluded because the remaining manuscripts were stolen from Disraeli's chambers, and he "never had the heart to undertake it again".

== Synopsis ==
Pluto, the king of hell, whisks Proserpine, the daughter of Jupiter, away to Hades. They are greeted by Pluto's loyal but monstrous dog, whom Proserpine takes an instant disliking to. She asks Pluto to prove his love for her by banishing the dog, which he does by promoting him from his role of Guardian of the Gates.

Pluto and Proserpine are disturbed one morning by a furore brought to them by Terror and Rage concerning a mortal who has got into hell. The mortal explains to the Hades assembly that his wife has died and he wants Pluto to revive her. Pluto declines but Proserpine pleads with him to yield which he does. The assembly wishes to call the Guardian of the Gates to account but learn that he has been “promoted”. Seeing the influence of the queen, all the assembly members resign.

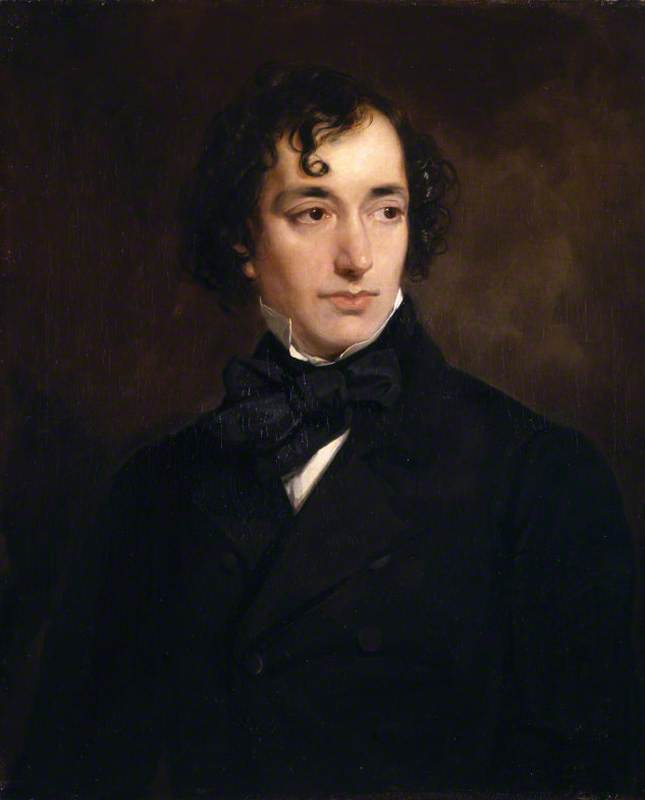
A retrospective portrayal (1852) of Disraeli as a young man when he wrote The Infernal Marriage

Shortly afterwards Proserpine falls ill but is brought back to health by an esteemed doctor brought to hell for that purpose. It is agreed that Proserpine should complete her recovery by visiting Elysium, Pluto remaining in Hades due to the difficult political situation. Proserpine's enemies see this as an opportunity to move against her.

Proserpine sets off with the seer Tiresias, the ship's captain and Lady Manto. En route they stop at a cavern owned by the Titan Porphyrion who has a toy model of the stars and skies which Saturn, who is now a dethroned monarch, made. Proserpine resolves to visit Saturn, whom they find in a magnificent palace with Titans. He attributes his fall to having unsuccessfully taken on the “spirit of the time”, embodied by Jupiter who, since coming to power, has not acted on the emancipatory liberal principles he espouses. Proserpine thinks they should embrace the spirit of the age.

Saturn then takes Proserpine to the Valley of Lamentations where they see the defeated Titans, including Hyperion and Enceladus who laments their fall and, like Oceanus, is pessimistic about their prospects. Briareus the Titan thinks they should fight back and blames the loss of Mount Olympus (to Jupiter) on the Titans being disunited, thereby letting in the Olympians, whereas Rhoetus believes the only way to beat the Olympians is by ridiculing them.

Proserpine's party journeys on to Elysium which is wonderful. The novel ends describing the habits of the Elysians, e.g. if rumours start to spread of a couple being devoted to each other, people deliberately spread other fabricated tales so that people cannot separate the lies from the facts so that nobody knows what to believe. The Elysians just enjoy themselves, all the work being done by sylphs and gnomes.

== Reception and analysis ==
The novelist William Beckford appreciated the novel conveying the message to its author via a friend, "Pray tell Disraeli that I have read, enjoyed, and admired his Infernal Marriage. The sly, dry humour of that most original composition is to me delightful."

Disraeli's father, Isaac, also a writer, considered The Infernal Marriage and the novel it immediately followed, Ixion in Heaven, to be his son's most original contribution to literature.

Much of the analysis of the novel has focussed on what its contents represented. Twenty years after publication, Disraeli himself wrote that Jupiter represented George IV, Apollo Lord Byron, Tiresias Talleyrand and Manto the Duchess of Dino. The introduction to the 1926 edition extended the list by likening Saturn to Charles X, Oceanus to Lord Goderich, Hyperion to Robert Peel, Elysium to London and the Titans led by Enceladus to the Tories under the Duke of Wellington with the young Disraeli represented by the mocking Rhoetus.

A more modern review, however, speculated that Enceladus represented Lord Lyndhurst before going on to suggest that, "Disraeli's propensity to autobiographical narratives," meant that the Pluto-Proserpine relationship reflected "Disraeli's own problems with Henrietta [Sykes]" with whom Disraeli was conducting an affair at the time of writing The Infernal Marriage.
