= Mallus (Cilicia) =

Ancient city in Anatolia

Coordinates: 36.7575°N 35.4868°E

Mallus (Greek: η Μαλλός Mallos; ethnonym: Μαλλώτης) was an ancient city of Cilicia Campestris (later Cilicia Prima) lying near the mouth of the Pyramus (now the Ceyhan Nehri) river, in Anatolia. In ancient times, the city was situated at the mouth of the Pyramus (which has changed course since), on a hill opposite Magarsa (or Magarsus) which served as its port. The district was named after it, Mallotis. The location of the site is currently inland a few km from the Mediterranean coast on an elevation in the Karataş Peninsula, Adana Province, Turkey, a few km from the city of Karataş.

== History ==
Greek legend credited the establishment of Mallus to two Argive brothers named Amphilochus and Mopsus. Amphilochus is variously described as the king and seer who was the son of Amphiaraus and the brother of Alcmaeon; Alcmaeon's son; or, in Strabo, either of these figures understood as a demigod son of Apollo. Both Amphiaraus's son and Alcmaeon's son were in the generations said to have witnessed the Trojan War. Amphilochus and Mopsus were said to have left that conflict and founded Mallus and some other oracles and towns before either returning to Argos or killing one another. Visitors to the oracle, which continued as late as Plutarch, slept overnight in the temple and their dreams were considered to be the gods' answer to their questions.

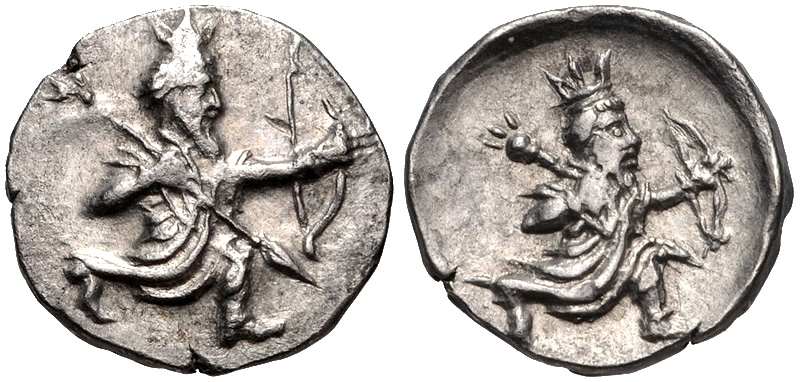
Persian Achaemenid Empire coin minted in Mallus, dated c. 390–385 BC

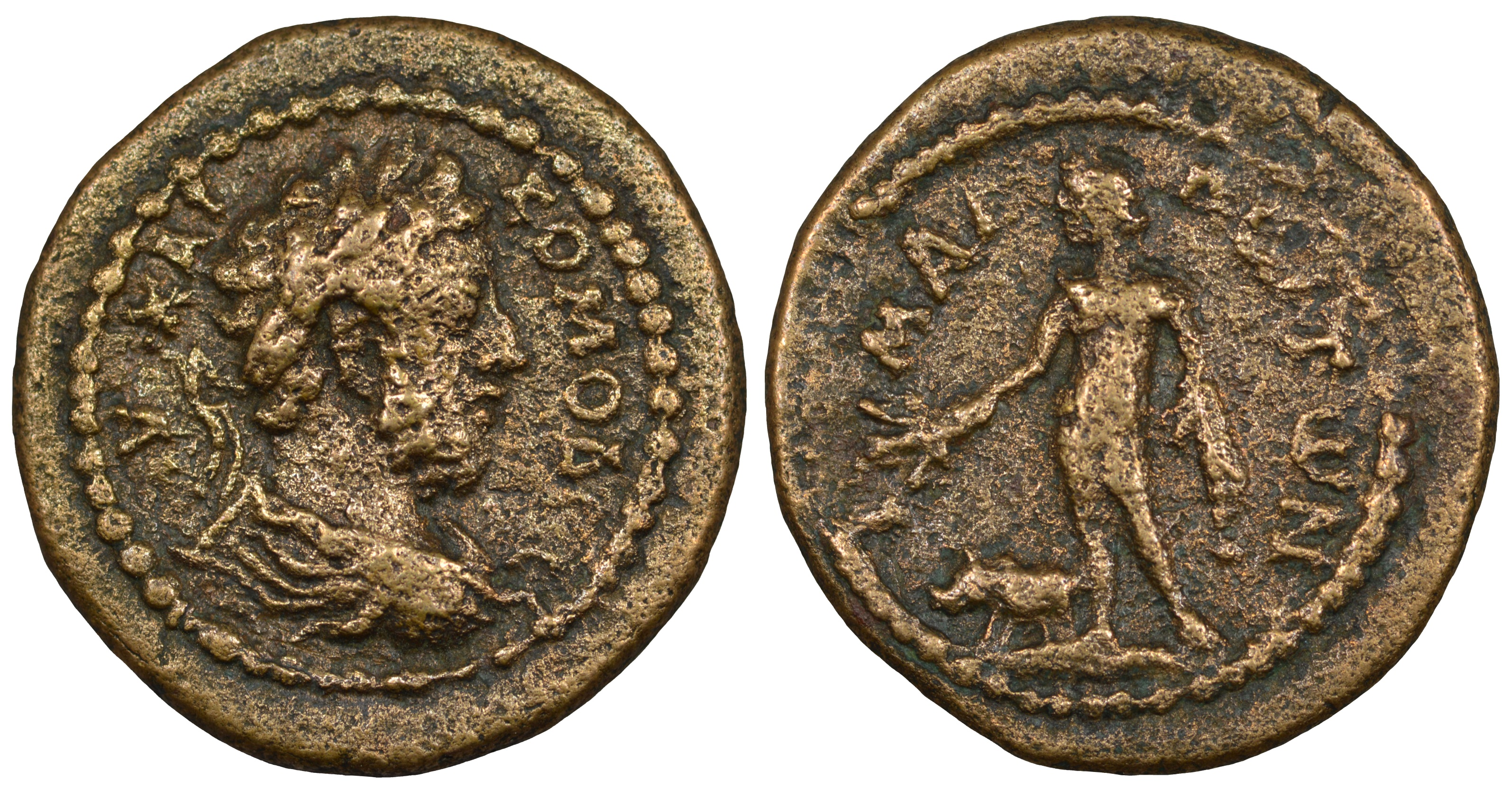
Coin minted in Mallus during the Roman Empire under Commodus, (dated c. AD 177-192) showing city founder Amphilochus I of Argos on the reverse.

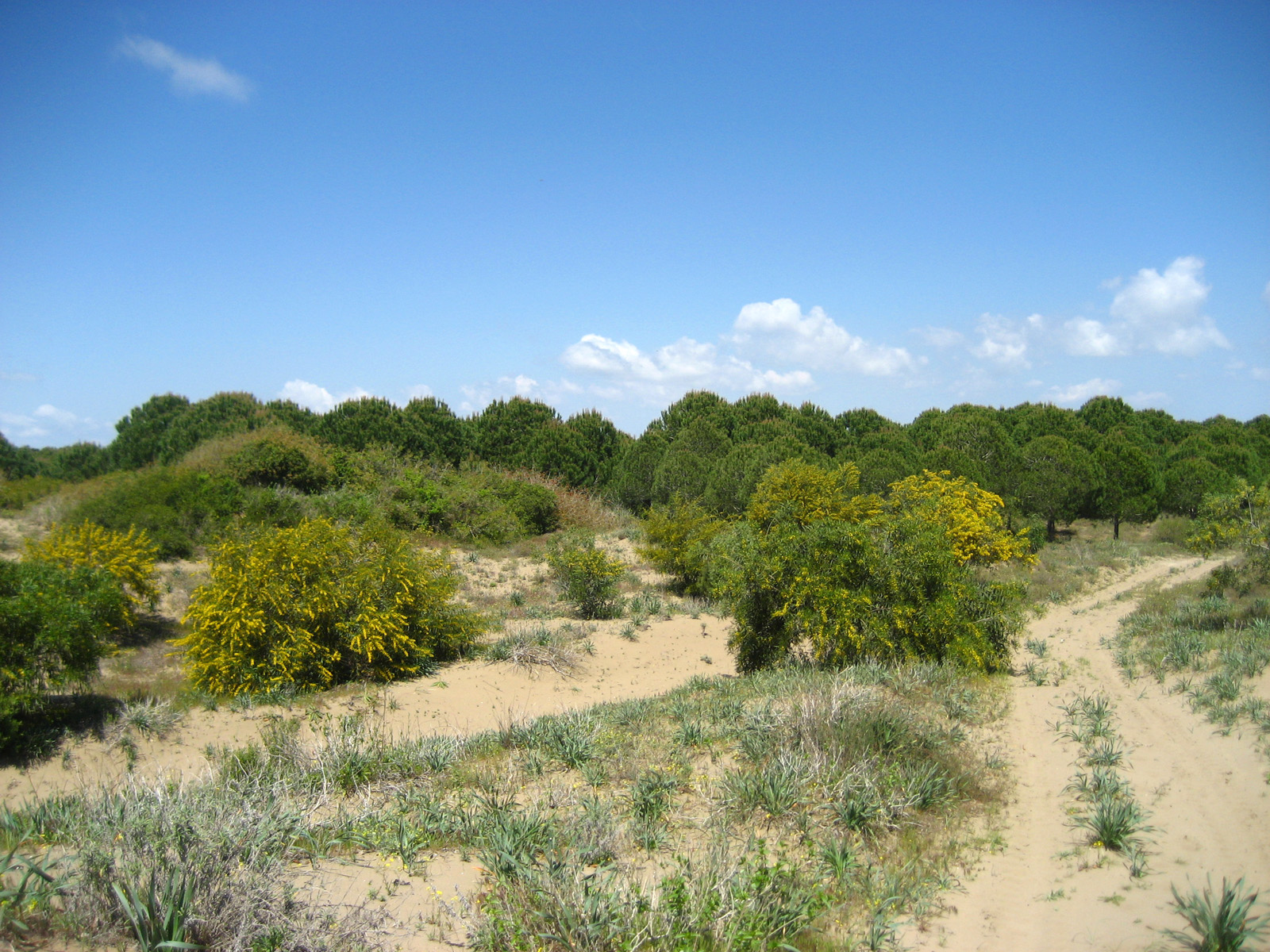
Coastline near Mallus

Alexander the Great erected a bridge over the Pyramus and visited Mallus during his conquest of the region, and at Mallus he performed sacrifices to Amphilochus. Alexander also exempted the town from paying taxes, because it was a colony of the Argives, and he himself claimed to have sprung from Argos, being one of the descendants of Heracles.

Triremes from Mallus joined Alexander's navy and participated at the Siege of Tyre.

It allied itself with Tarsus against Antiochus IV Epiphanes, who according to the Apocrypha, had presented both cities to his concubine Antiochis. Mallus was a town of considerable importance, though it does not appear to have possessed any particular attractions. In the second century B.C., it was the hometown of the notable philosopher and grammarian Crates of Mallus, credited with having built the first known globe; however, he left the city at a young age and his scholarly career mainly took place elsewhere.

Its port-town was Magarsa, though in later times it seems to have had a port of its own, called Portus Palorum. Numerous coins from Mallus have been preserved, and those of the third century bear the inscription Mallus Colonia or Colonia Metropolis Mallus. The city is mentioned by numerous ancient authors, and in the Middle Ages by Arabian, Armenian, and Italian writers. The city declined in importance and disappeared with the Armenian Kingdom of Cilicia. The ancient site of Antiochia ad Pyramum lies a few km away on the coast.

Mallus figures in the various revisions of the Antiochene Notitiae Episcopatuum as suffragan of Tarsus. Six bishops are recorded. Bematius, present at the Council of Antioch (377); Valentine, present at the First Council of Ephesus (431) and the Council of Tarsus (434); Chrysippus at the Council of Chalcedon (451). The see is included in the Catholic Church's list of titular sees. No titular bishop of the see has been appointed since the death of its last bishop in 1990.

== Notable persons ==
- Dionysiades (Ancient Greek: Διονυσιάδης) of Mallos was a Greek tragic poet.
- Proclus Mallotes was a stoic philosopher.
- Crates of Mallus was a stoic philosopher.
- Philistides (Ancient Greek: Φιλιστείδης), a scholar.
- Lysanias (Ancient Greek: Λυσανίας) of Mallos, a historian.

== Bishopric ==
A bishopric is mentioned in the Antiochene "Notititae Episcopatuum" as suffragan of the patriarchate of Antioch and was suffragan of the archdiocese of Tarsus. Six bishops are known:

- Bematius, present at the Council of Antioch (377);
- Valentine, at the Council of Ephesus (431) and Synod of Tarsus (434);
- Chrysippus at the Council of Chalcedon (451).
- Attalo (fl 459)
- Cosma (fl 553)

Today it survives only as a Titular See of Roman Catholic Church.

== Location ==
The precise location of Mallus has been the subject of some study. Quintus Curtius states that Alexander entered the town after throwing a bridge across the Pyramus, implying that Mallus must have been situated near the mouth of the river Pyramus, on the eastern bank, opposite to Megarsus (modern Karataş). According to Scylax (p. 40) it was necessary to sail up the river a short distance in order to reach Mallus; and Pomponius Mela (i.13) also states that the town is situated close upon the river; whence Ptolemy (v.8.4) must be mistaken in placing it more than two miles away from the river.

Mallus is commonly believed to be in the town of Kızıltahta, Adana Province. The nearby town of Terkosan is mentioned being its necropolis. The city's location at Kızıltahta has been extrapolated by reference to the ancient sources. Stadiasmus indicates that Mallus was 150 stades away from Megarsus (Megarsus is identified to be modern Karataş). One stadia equals 600 feet and 150 stades is 27.4 km. When this distance is measured from Karataş within a 1:100,000 scale map of Turkey, the city's location is in the periphery of Kızıltahta.
