= Mopsucrene =

Town in the eastern part of ancient Cilicia

- Μόψου κρήνη (Ancient Greek)
- Location of Mopsucrene in present-day Turkey
- 37.0733365°N 34.8858995°E

Mopsucrene or Mopsoukrene (Ancient Greek: Μόψου κρήνη) was a town in the eastern part of ancient Cilicia, on the river Cydnus, and not far from the frontier of Cataonia to which Ptolemy, in fact, assigns it. Its site was on the southern slope of Mount Taurus, and in the neighbourhood of the mountain pass leading from Cilicia into Cappadocia, 12 miles (19 km) north of Tarsus. Its site was likely the same as the settlement and mutatio of Mampsoukrenai or Mapsoukrenai, and known in Hellenic antiquity as Mópsou Krênae 'Fountains of Mopsus'.

Its site is tentatively located near Kırıt, which is a neighbourhood in Tarsus, Mersin in Asiatic Turkey. It was on the road between Tyana and Tarsus, inhabited during Roman Byzantine times.

The town is named after the seer Mopsus, its name means "Springs of Mopsus". It is celebrated in history as the place where the emperor Constantius II died (3 November 361). In the Antonine Itinerary, it is called Namsucrone; in the Jerusalem Itinerary, it is called Mansverine.

Its site is tentatively located near Kırıt, which is a neighbourhood in Tarsus, Mersin in Asiatic Turkey.

== See also ==
- Mopsuestia
