= Claros =

Ancient Greek sanctuary on Ionian coast

- Κλάρος (in Ancient Greek); Clarus (in Latin)
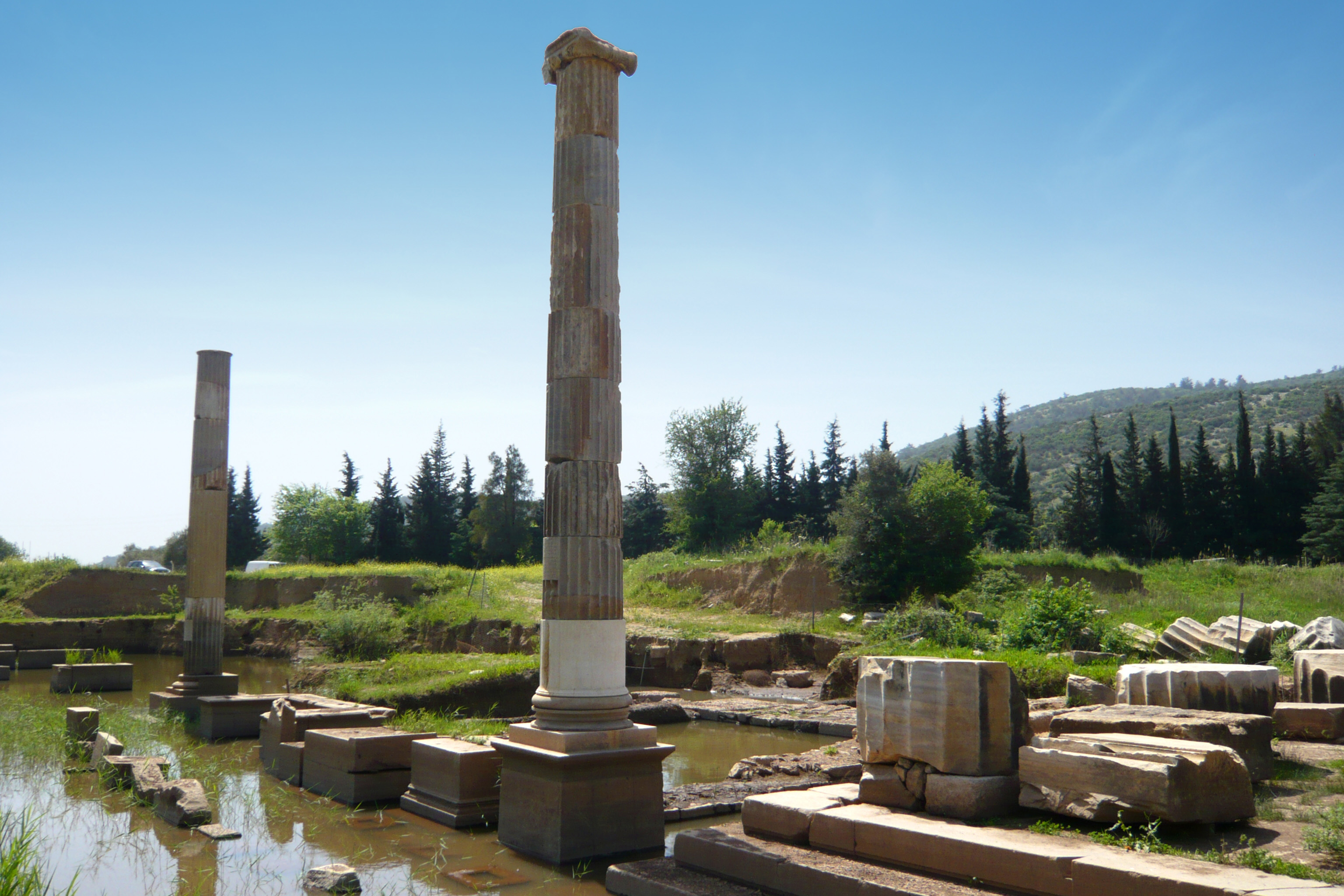
- The Temple of Apollo at Claros

- Location within Turkey
- 38°00′18″N 27°11′34″E
- Type: Sanctuary
- Satellite of: Colophon
- Location: Ahmetbeyli, İzmir Province, Turkey
- Region: Ionia

Site notes
- Condition: Ruined
- Owner: Public
- Public access: Yes

Claros (/ˈklɛərəs/; Greek: Κλάρος, Klaros; Latin: Clarus) was an ancient Greek sanctuary on the coast of Ionia. It contained a temple and oracle of Apollo, honored here as Apollo Clarius. It was located in the territory of Colophon, which lay twelve kilometers to the north, one of the twelve cities of the Ionian League. The coastal city Notion lay two kilometers to the south. The ruins of the sanctuary are now found north of the modern town Ahmetbeyli in the Menderes district of İzmir Province, Turkey.

The Temple of Apollo at Claros was a very important center of prophecy, as in Delphi and Didyma. The oldest literary information about this sacred site goes back to the seventh and sixth centuries BC, through the Homeric Hymns, though Proto-Geometric pottery at the site betokens 9th century occupation. A sacred cave near the Temple of Apollo, which was an important place both in the Hellenistic and Roman eras, points to the existence of a Cybele cult in early periods here. Games called the Claria were held at Claros every fifth year in honor of Apollo.

== History ==
A map of the main sanctuaries in Classical Greece

It is unknown when the sanctuary was founded exactly and its origins are shrouded in mythology. Archaeological excavations revealed structures dating back to the 10th century BC. The high point for the fame of the sanctuary seems to have been the 2nd and 3rd centuries AD and it had many visitors until the 4th century AD.

=== Materials and source ===
In the late Hellenistic period, a cargo ship carrying marble sank on its way to Claros off the southwest coast of modern-day Turkey near Kizilburun. The ship was discovered in 1993, and has been under excavation since 2005. On this ship, an estimated fifty tons of marble columns were recovered that matched the description of the columns found at Claros, the temple of Apollo. Isotopic and meteorological data indicate Proconnesos in the Sea of Marmara as the source of the marble. The marble being imported from the island to be used at the site was a special type with distinctive blue and white bands known as Proconnesian marble. The marble did not complete its 350 kilometer journey.

=== Foundation ===
The founding myth of Claros connects the city with the myth of the Epigoni who conquered Thebes. The two seers Teiresias and his daughter Manto became their captives along with other Thebans. The Epigoni sent them to Delphi to honor Apollo, but Teiresias died on the journey. At Delphi, Manto was commanded by Apollo to sail to Ionia with the remaining Thebans to found a colony there. When they arrived at the site where Claros would be founded later, they were seized by armed Cretans under Rhacius, the Cretan settler of Caria. After learning from Manto who they were and why they had come, Rhacius married her and allowed the Thebans to found Claros. Their heir was the seer Mopsus.

Thus the origin of the oracle at Clarus was remembered by Greeks of the Classical period as Minoan-Mycenean in origin. Archaeological investigations lend support to the myth. Intensely settled Mycenaean sites have been identified at Ephesus to the south and numerous other nearby sites. Miletus had a historical Minoan settlement, discovered in 1995/96 by the German school. In Claros itself, deep exploratory trenches dug between the altar and the temple façade, revealed Protogeometric pottery of the 10th century BC, attesting to the presence hinted at in myth.

At Colophon, a Mycenaean-era tomb has been found, but the presence of Mycenaean pottery is uncertain.

According to mythology the Greek seer Calchas, a participant in the Trojan War, died at Claros. He challenged Mopsus to see who had the greatest skill in divination, but lost and died of grief.

=== Hellenistic period ===
According to legend the oracle at Claros advised the citizens of Smyrna to move from Old Smyrna to the new Smyrna on Mount Pagos (modern Kadifekale), which was refounded there by Alexander the Great. The Smyrnaeans decided to follow up on the advice. Old Smyrna had lost its importance at the time, but after its second foundation it would become one of the most prosperous cities of Asia.

=== Roman period ===
Many monuments were erected in the Roman period (Pompey, Lucullus, Quintus Tullius Cicero); several took place above Hellenistic foundations. Pliny the Elder remarks that "At Colophon, in the cave of the Clarian Apollo, there is a pool, by the drinking of which a power is acquired of uttering wonderful oracles; but the lives of those who drink of it are shortened". Iamblichus said that the oracle, during the ecstasy “... is not in control of himself and does not follow what he is saying, or where he is...” Germanicus famously visited the oracle in 18 AD (a year before his death) and "It was said that he prophesied to Germanicus, in dark hints, as oracles usually do, an early doom".

== Excavations ==
Claros had been entirely buried in the alluvial silt deposited by the small river at the site, a widespread phenomenon along this coastline during the 1st century BC, as the hinterland was deforested. T. Macridy uncovered the monumental entrance to the sanctuary in 1905 and returned for further explorations with the French archaeologist Charles Picard in 1913. Excavations recommenced between 1950 and 1961 under Louis Robert, and a series of important Roman dedicated monuments came to light, as well as the famous Doric Temple of Apollo, seat of the oracle, in its final grand though uncompleted Hellenistic phase, 3rd century BC. The Sacred Way was excavated in 1988 under J. de La Genière. Since then much alluvial spoil has been carted off-site and Claros was prepared to receive visitors.

The excavations conducted since 1988 have demonstrated that there was a religious area there around a spring of fresh water from the 9th century BC. The first known construction is a round altar of the second half of the 7th century. It was covered over around the middle of the 6th century by a large rectangular altar (14.85 × 6.05 m); at the same time a marble temple was built for Apollo around the spring while Apollo's sister, Artemis, had her own precinct and a smaller altar (3.50 × 150 m): next to it were found the bases of two korai, one of which is preserved (the head is missing). There were at least four statues of kouroi dedicated to Apollo; three of them, incomplete, have been found.

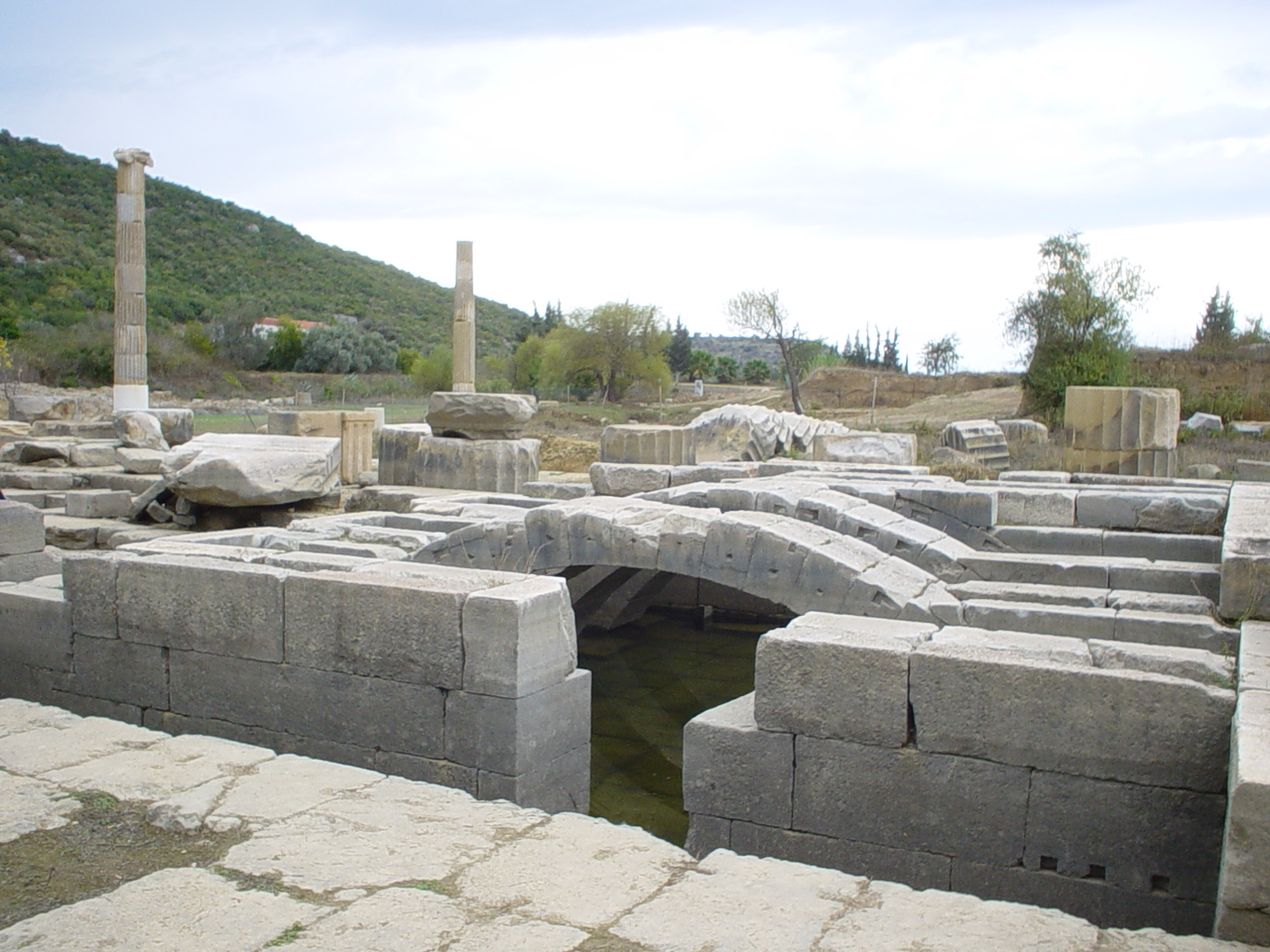
The maze-like adyton beneath the Temple of Apollo has been preserved well.

Very few changes occurred in the sanctuary between the 6th and the end of the 4th century. At that time a new layout of the sacred area was conceived, with monuments on a larger scale; most probably, the plans were put into execution only after the terrible events of the beginning of the 3rd century BC. Later in the 3rd century construction began on the new altar and the new Temple of Apollo. It had a dark crypt-like adyton from where the oracle delivered his prophecies. Today it is well preserved and its narrow, dark and vaulted labyrinthine corridors remain.

Above the ground, remains can be seen of the base and fragments of the colossal sculptures of a seated Apollo with his lyre, accompanied by Leto and Artemis, facing to the east. The group, whose fragments are partially reassembled at the site, seems to have measured more than seven meters in height. In the sanctuary, rows of names of the countless grateful ancient visitors may still be seen, votive and memorial inscriptions on columns, on steps and walls and even on a curving marble bench: in their entirety the inscription of Clarus form the largest assembly of surviving Greek inscriptions. An elegant marble chair in the sanctuary has serpent arms, a reminder of the chthonic nature of all genuine oracles among the Hellenes, and which likely reflects Apollo's conquering of Python and subsequent establishment of the temple at Delphi.

After the beginning of the Roman Province of Asia (end of the 2nd century BC), prominent citizens of Colophon helped to increase the authority of the sanctuary, the importance of the religious competitions and the fame of the oracle. To celebrate the major sacrifices before crowds consisting of Greeks and non-Greeks, four rows of iron rings attached to heavy blocks allowed a hundred victims to be killed simultaneously. Claros is the only sanctuary in the Greek world which offers a clear picture of the way priests could perform the hecatomb.
