= Sarımsaklı =

Sarımsaklı may refer to the following places in Turkey:

- Sarımsaklı, Karataş, a neighbourhood in Karataş District, Adana Province
- Sarımsaklı, Melikgazi, a neighbourhood in Melikgazi District, Kayseri Province
- the former name of Bünyan, Kayseri Province
- the coastal area of Küçükköy, Balıkesir Province
