= Ras al-Bassit =

Town in Syria

- رأس البسيط (Arabic)
- Location within Syria
- 35.846°N 35.838°E
- Type: settlement
- Periods: Late Bronze Age, Iron Age, Hellenistic period, Roman period, Late antiquity, Crusader period
- Cultures: Canaanite, Hellenistic, Roman, Byzantine, Crusader
- Location: 53 km north of Latakia, Syria

Site notes
- Excavation dates: 1971–1984, 2000
- Archaeologists: Paul Courbin, Jacques Y. Perreault, Nicolas Beaudry
- Owner: Mixed public and private
- Public access: Partial

Ras al-Bassit (Arabic: رأس البسيط), the classical Posidium or Posideium (Ancient Greek: Ποσιδήιον and Ποσείδιον, Posidḗion), is a small town in Syria named for a nearby cape. It has been occupied since at least the late Bronze Age and was a fortified port under Greek and Roman rule. Herodotus—although not later classical geographers—made it the northwestern point of Syria. Its beaches have a distinctive black sand and are a popular resort destination within Syria.

== Name ==
"Raʾs" (رأس) is the Arabic word for "head", used for headlands and capes. "Bassit" is a transcription of its former name Posidium, as standard Arabic is only able to voice bilabial stops. The Roman name Posidium or Posideium was a latinization of the Greek name Posideion, meaning "[place] of Poseidon", the Greek seagod. It was known as "Bosyt" under Ottoman rule.

The Syrian municipality is also known as simply Al-Bassit.

== Geography ==
Ras al-Bassit is a small cape on the Syrian coast of the Mediterranean Sea. It is located about 10 km (6.2 mi) south of Mount Aqra, the highest mountain on the Mediterranean's eastern coast, and about 53 km (33 mi) north of Latakia, modern Syria's principal port. As Mount Aqra—the Phoenician Sapan, Biblical Zaphon, and classical Casius—marked the coastal border between the regions of Cilicia and Syria under the Persians, Ras al-Bassit functioned as a kind of border town at times. Ras al-Bassit is located, however, about 80 kilometres (50 mi) south of the later Syrio-Cilician border at the line between the Syrian Gates in the Nur Mountains and Myriandrus on the coast.

Local sealife include crustaceans, molluscs, sea turtles, and dolphins.

== History ==
=== Late Bronze Age ===
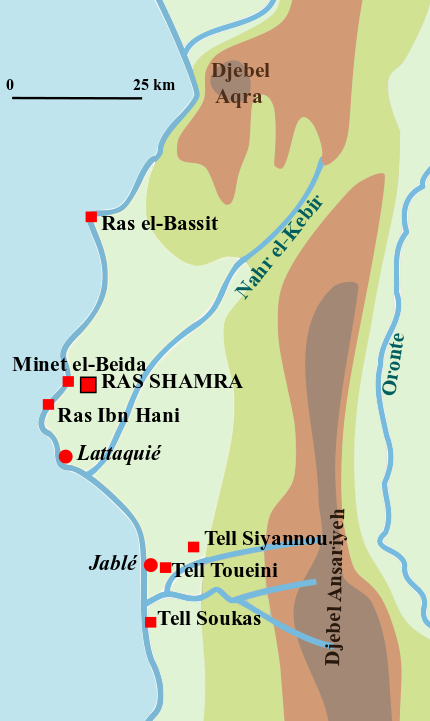
Ras al-Bassit on the map of localities in the kingdom of Ugarit

The oldest known settlement at Ras al-Bassit was a Bronze-Age outpost with a fortified citadel established by Ugarit between 1550 and 1200 BC. It traded extensively with Cyprus and Phoenicia and survived Ugarit's destruction by the Sea Peoples. It was eventually abandoned or destroyed in the early Iron Age.

=== Iron Age ===
Greek legends credited the establishment of Posideion to the wandering Argive king and seer Amphilochus or his identically-named nephew. Both supposedly lived during the generations that fought in the Trojan War; the actual Greek colony at the site seems to have been established during the 7th century BC.

=== Classical Age ===
==== Persian Period ====
It marked the northern border of the 5th Satrapy of the Persian Empire at the time of Herodotus, but archaeologists have found that the town was destroyed at some point in the 5th or 4th centuries BC. Because of the discrepancy between Herodotus's account and other classical descriptions of the Syrio-Cilician border, some historians have disputed the identity of Herodotus's Posideion with the later Roman Posidium and present Ras al-Bassit.

==== Hellenistic Period ====
Alexander the Great's decisive battle at Issus occurred nearby in 333 BC, after which his empire administered and hellenized the area. After Alexander's death in 323 BC, the territory fell to the Diadochi warlord Seleucus. Posideion was apparently rebuilt with a fortified acropolis under his reign at some point after 312 BC, when the existing settlement was razed by Ptolemy.

==== Roman Period ====
Under Roman rule, it appeared in Strabo's Geography. The Roman emperors Hadrian and Julian may have used Posidium's port, as they are recording having climbing the nearby Mount Aqra to perform sacrifices. The town thrived during the late imperial and early Byzantine periods, after the city was refortified in the 3rd century. Several other building projects, including an expansion of the port and erection of several large villas, were subsequently undertaken. In the 6th century, a church complex was built at the foot of the acropolis.

=== Later Ages ===
The site was largely abandoned following the Muslim conquest of the area in the 630s. The First Crusade led to the establishment of the Principality of Antioch in the area in the 1090s. At some point in the 12th or 13th century, a new, smaller chapel was erected within the Byzantine church's ruins. The Egyptian sultan Baibars reconquered the area in the 1260s. The port was still used by Venetian ships as late as the 16th century but was abandoned by all but the local fishermen by the 19th.

A French excavation led by Paul Courbin between 1971 and 1984 revealed the former Ugarit and Greek ruins. Quebecois excavations conducted by Montreal University and the Rimouski's provincial university since 2000 focused on the late classical and medieval ruins at the site. Ruins uncovered by the expeditions have been left uncovered and unprotected between seasons, mixing with the modern marina and countryside.

In the early 1970s, the Ministry of Tourism seized ownership of the entire Syrian coast to a distance of 3 km (1.9 mi), offering only nominal compensation. Little was done by the ministry to develop most of the coast for tourists but, although most people still claimed ownership of their land, the murky legal status hindered any other development whatsoever into the 21st century. A side effect was the relative conservation of Syria's Mediterranean forests. Ras al-Bassit, however, was a model area that saw construction of several hundred chalets and, in 1991, a small hotel run by the Syrian Workers Union. That hotel began operating year-round in 2001, and a second hotel run by the Farmers Union began operation in 2005.

As part of the trend towards limiting and improving tourist and conservation areas while permitting more development elsewhere, 3,000 hectares (7,400 acres) around Ras al-Bassit were declared a protected forestry area by the Ministry of Agriculture on 29 May 1999. Annual tourist visits to the area reached 150,000 by 2004; most were Syrians from Aleppo or Damascus, some were Jordanians, and very few were from non-Arab states.

== Religion ==
Apart from the ruins of the medieval church, there is a shrine to St George (Al-Khuder) just north of the town. Most of the population are Alawites.

== Education ==
Local villages and farms have elementary schools and the town itself has a middle school. High school students travel to Zeghreen, 20 km (12 mi) away. Teachers come from other areas and university graduates are few in number.

== Economy ==
Prior to the current civil war, locals' income depended on fishing, agriculture, and tourism. Most of Al-Bassit's agriculture depends on citrus and olive trees. Locals protect their orchards from wild boars. Tourist income derived in large part from boat and chalet rentals.

== See also ==
- Seleucia-by-the-Sea, Antioch's main port during antiquity
- St Symeon, Antioch's main port during the Crusades
- Latakia (Laodicea-by-the-Sea), Syria's present main port
