= Damlapınar =

Damlapınar can refer to:

- Damlapınar, Karataş
- Damlapınar, Palu
