= Tisiphone (daughter of Alcmaeon) =

Daughter of Alcmaeon in Greek mythology

In Greek mythology, Tisiphone (/tɪˈsɪfəni/ tiss-IF-ə-nee; Ancient Greek: Τισιφόνη, romanized: Tisiphónē, lit. 'avenger of bloodshed') is the daughter of Alcmaeon, Argive hero and one of the Epigoni, and Manto, the daughter of Tiresias. As an infant Tisiphone was given to the care of the royal couple of Corinth, but as she grew up the queen sold her as slave, envious of her great beauty. Tisiphone was eventually reunited with her birth family.

Tisiphone's story is mostly known from second-century sources, but it is known she originally appeared in Alcmaeon in Corinth, a lost drama of the fifth century BC, thanks to surviving fragments.

== Mythology ==
=== Apollodorus ===
According to second-century author Apollodorus, during Alcmaeon's madness following his murder of his mother Eriphyle, he fathered two children on Manto the daughter of Tiresias; Tisiphone and her brother Amphilochus, who might have been twins and were probably born at Delphi, where their mother lived at the time. Alcmaeon quickly brought his infants to Corinth and trusted them on king Creon to raise them and keep them safe.

Years passed and Tisiphone grew to be an exceedingly beautiful maiden, which caused Creon's wife discomfort and fear that Creon might decide to set her aside in order to marry Tisiphone instead. To prevent that, the queen sold Tisiphone as a slave, and as it happened the buyer proved to be none other than her father Alcmaeon himself, who did not recognise his daughter and kept her as a maid. Alcmaeon also went to Corinth and recovered his son as well.

=== Euripides ===
The sole surviving coherent source of Tisiphone's tale is Apollodorus, who attributes this particular version to an old tragedy by Athenian playwright Euripides, no doubt the now lost Alcmaeon in Corinth, which was first produced posthumously around 405 BC and related the events of Alcmaeon's adventures in Corinth. The story could have been lifted from the lost epic poem Alcmeonis or even an original story created by Euripides himself. From the surviving fragments we can extrapolate that the play opened with a narration of the events by Apollo, followed by Alcmaeon's arrival in Corinth accompanied by Tisiphone, where the recognition between father and daughter took place and the girl's real identity was revealed to him, probably by the queen herself. Then, Creon fled into exile and Amphilochus similarly learnt that Alcmaeon was his true father, and not Creon.

== See also ==
- Telephus
- Amphion and Zethus
- Theano

== Bibliography ==
- Apollodorus, The Library with an English Translation by Sir James George Frazer, F.B.A., F.R.S. in 2 Volumes, Cambridge, MA, Harvard University Press; London, William Heinemann Ltd. 1921. ISBN 0-674-99135-4. Online version at the Perseus Digital Library. Greek text available from the same website.
- Avery, Catherine B., ed. (1962). New Century Classical Handbook. New York, US: Appleton-Century-Crofts.
- Bell, Robert E. (1991). Women of Classical Mythology: A Biographical Dictionary. ABC-Clio. ISBN 9780874365818.
- Diodorus Siculus, Bibliotheca Historica, with an English translation by Charles Henry Oldfather, volumes I-VI. Loeb Classical Library 279. Cambridge, MA: Harvard University Press, 1933. Online text available at penelope.uchicago.edu.
- Euripides (2008). Collard, Christopher; Cropp, Martin (eds.). Fragments: Augeus-Meleager. Loeb Classical Library 504. Harvard University Press. ISBN 978-0-674-99625-0.
- Gantz, Timothy (1993). Early Greek Myth: A Guide to Literary and Artistic Sources. Vol. 1. Johns Hopkins University Press. ISBN 978-0-8018-5360-9.
- Grimal, Pierre (1987). The Dictionary of Classical Mythology. Wiley-Blackwell. ISBN 0-631-13209-0.
- March, Jennifer R. (May 31, 2014). Dictionary of Classical Mythology. Oxbow Books. ISBN 978-1-78297-635-6.
- Smith, William (1873). A Dictionary of Greek and Roman Biography and Mythology. London, UK: John Murray, printed by Spottiswoode and Co. Online version at the Perseus.tufts library.
- Tripp, Edward (June 1970). Crowell's Handbook of Classical Mythology (1st ed.). Thomas Y. Crowell Co. ISBN 069022608X.
