= Antiochia ad Pyramum =

Ancient city of Cilicia, successor to Magarsa

Coordinates: 36°32′39″N 35°20′46″E

Antiochia ad Pyramum (Ancient Greek: Ἀντιόχεια πρὸς τὸν Πύραμον) was an ancient coastal city of Cilicia, on the Pyramus (also Pyramos, now the Ceyhan Nehri) river, in Anatolia. It was the successor settlement to Magarsa. The location of the city is on the Karataş Peninsula, Adana Province, Turkey, a few kilometers from the city of Karataş. The course of the Pyramus has changed markedly since ancient times and the location of the ruins is no longer adjacent to the river, but decidedly west of its present course. The formerly important ancient site of Mallus lies a few kilometers inland from Antiochia ad Pyranum along the former course of the Pyramus.
