= Oymaklı, Karataş =

Oymaklı
- Neighbourhood
- Location in Turkey
- Coordinates: 36°43′35″N 35°21′13″E
- Country: Turkey
- Province: Adana
- District: Karataş
- Population (2022): 235
- Time zone: UTC+3 (TRT)

Oymaklı is a neighbourhood in the municipality and district of Karataş, Adana Province, Turkey. Its population is 235 (2022).
