= Çukurkamış, Karataş =

Çukurkamış
- Neighbourhood
- Location in Turkey
- Coordinates: 36°41′N 35°21′E
- Country: Turkey
- Province: Adana
- District: Karataş
- Population (2022): 199
- Time zone: UTC+3 (TRT)

Çukurkamış is a neighbourhood in the municipality and district of Karataş, Adana Province, Turkey. Its population is 199 (2022).
