= İnnaplıhüyüğü, Karataş =

İnnaplıhüyüğü
- Neighbourhood
- Country: Turkey
- Province: Adana
- District: Karataş
- Population (2022): 157
- Time zone: UTC+3 (TRT)

İnnaplıhüyüğü is a neighbourhood in the municipality and district of Karataş, Adana Province, Turkey. Its population is 157 (2022).
