= Karagöçer, Karataş =

Karagöçer
- Neighbourhood
- Location in Turkey
- Coordinates: 36°43′N 35°09′E
- Country: Turkey
- Province: Adana
- District: Karataş
- Population (2022): 911
- Time zone: UTC+3 (TRT)

Karagöçer is a neighbourhood in the municipality and district of Karataş, Adana Province, Turkey. Its population is 911 (2022).
