= Helvacı, Karataş =

Helvacı
- Neighbourhood
- Location in Turkey
- Coordinates: 36°42′54″N 35°21′32″E
- Country: Turkey
- Province: Adana
- District: Karataş
- Population (2022): 365
- Time zone: UTC+3 (TRT)

Helvacı is a neighbourhood in the municipality and district of Karataş, Adana Province, Turkey. Its population is 365 (2022).
