= Yüzbaşı, Karataş =

Yüzbaşı
- Neighbourhood
- Location in Turkey
- Coordinates: 36°43′32″N 35°20′18″E
- Country: Turkey
- Province: Adana
- District: Karataş
- Population (2022): 205
- Time zone: UTC+3 (TRT)

Yüzbaşı is a neighbourhood in the municipality and district of Karataş, Adana Province, Turkey. Its population is 205 (2022).
