= Bahçe, Karataş =

Bahçe
- Neighbourhood
- Location within Turkey
- Coordinates: 36.611°N 35.448°E
- Country: Turkey
- Province: Adana
- District: Karataş
- Population (2022): 2,062
- Time zone: UTC+3 (TRT)

Bahçe is a neighbourhood of the municipality and district of Karataş, Adana Province, Turkey. Its population is 2,062 (2022). Before the 2013 reorganisation, it was a town (belde).

The neighbourhood is populated by Alawites
