= Yassıören, Karataş =

Yassıören
- Neighbourhood
- Location in Turkey
- Coordinates: 36°43′55″N 35°12′30″E
- Country: Turkey
- Province: Adana
- District: Karataş
- Population (2022): 103
- Time zone: UTC+3 (TRT)

Yassıören (also: Yassıveren) is a neighbourhood in the municipality and district of Karataş, Adana Province, Turkey. Its population is 103 (2022).
