= Tilphussa =

Legendary spring in Boeotia, Greece

Tilphussa (Ancient Greek: Τιλφοῦ(σ)σα Tilphoũssa) is a spring in Boeotia. Tiresias died after he drank water from this spring. Strabo locates the deadly spring below the slopes of Tilphossium (Τιλφωσσαῖον, near Haliartus and Alalcomenae; he mentions the sanctuary of Tiresias and the temple of Tilphoussian Apollo, unique to this site. Pausanias noted that a temple consecrated to Praxidike was in the vicinity of Tiresias's tomb. The manuscript tradition of Plutarch's Life of Lysander offers a unique report of a spring Kissousa at Haliartus, in which the infant Dionysus was washed; this must be a scribal error for Tilphousa.
