= Sirkenli, Karataş =

Sirkenli
- Neighbourhood
- Location in Turkey
- Coordinates: 36°44′N 35°24′E
- Country: Turkey
- Province: Adana
- District: Karataş
- Population (2022): 533
- Time zone: UTC+3 (TRT)

Sirkenli is a neighbourhood in the municipality and district of Karataş, Adana Province, Turkey. Its population is 533 (2022).
