= Tabaklar, Karataş =

Tabaklar
- Neighbourhood
- Location in Turkey
- Coordinates: 36°45′02″N 35°00′06″E
- Country: Turkey
- Province: Adana
- District: Karataş
- Population (2022): 596
- Time zone: UTC+3 (TRT)

Tabaklar is a neighbourhood in the municipality and district of Karataş, Adana Province, Turkey. Its population is 596 (2022).
