= Myriandus =

Ancient Phoenician port near Antioch, modern Turkey

- Location within Turkey
- 36°33′58″N 36°06′39″E
- Location: Turkey
- Region: Hatay Province

Myriandus (Greek: Μυρίανδος Mūríandos, from Hittite mūri-, "grape cluster", and -anda, a place name suffix; by folk etymology with Greek andr-, "man", also spelled Myriandrus: Μυρίανδρος Mūríandros) was an ancient Phoenician port on the Mediterranean Sea's Gulf of Alexandretta. Its ruins are located near the modern city of İskenderun in southern Turkey.

Herodotus records the entire Gulf of Alexandretta as Marandynian Bay (Ancient Greek: Μυριανδικὸς κόλπος), after Myriandus. (Later classical geographers would subsequently name the bay after nearby Issus.) Stephanus of Byzantium also called it Marandynian gulf.

Xenophon claimed that Myriandus was the border town between Cilicia and Syria. Herodotus, meanwhile, placed the line further south at Ras al-Bassit in what is now Syria. Xenophon also say that it was an Emporium.

In 333 BC, Alexander the Great encamped near the city and intended to attack on the army of Darius III of Persia, but at the night a heavy tempest and storm detained him in his camp. In the end the battle took place near Issus.
