= Develiören, Karataş =

Develiören
- Neighbourhood
- Location in Turkey
- Coordinates: 36°44′N 35°27′E
- Country: Turkey
- Province: Adana
- District: Karataş
- Population (2022): 24
- Time zone: UTC+3 (TRT)

Develiören is a neighbourhood in the municipality and district of Karataş, Adana Province, Turkey. Its population is 24 (2022).
