= Manto (daughter of Tiresias) =

Theban oracle and partner of Alcmaeon, in Greek mythology

In Greek mythology, Manto (Ancient Greek: Μαντώ, romanized: Mantṓ, lit. 'seeress') was a seer from Thebes. She was the daughter of the prophet Tiresias and mother of Mopsus.

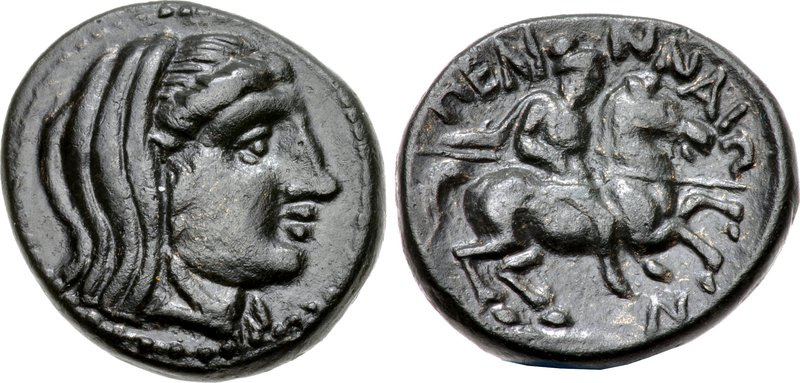
Veiled head of Manto (left) and a Thessalian horse rider inscribed on a 3rd-2nd century coin (right)

== Mythology ==
During the War of the Epigoni, a later myth relates, Manto was brought to Delphi as a war prize. Apollo made her his priestess and sent her to Colophon to found an oracle devoted to him. She had a son named Mopsus by Apollo, although by some accounts, the father of Mopsus is Rhacius, whom Manto later married. According to the Bibliotheca, she had two children by Alcmaeon, Amphilochus and Tisiphone. In an early version, Apollo instructed her to marry the first man she saw outside of Delphi (who turned out to be Rhacius). Rhacius then took her to Claros (which, like Colophon, is in western Asia Minor) and there she founded the oracle of Apollo Clarios. When she arrived, Manto wept bitter tears for her ravaged city. As they fell to the ground, the tears transformed into a spring.

In Roman myth, Manto went to Italy and gave birth to Ocnus (father: Tiberinus, the genius of the river Tiber). Ocnus founded Mantua and named it after his mother. It was said that Manto's abilities in prophecy were much greater than her father's.

Manto also appears in the myth of Niobe, the boastful queen of Thebes who degraded Leto. Manto warns her not to anger the gods and suggests she ask for Leto's forgiveness. Niobe refuses and continues to insult Leto, and consequently is punished by Apollo and Artemis.

Lampus, who tried to violate Manto on her couch, was killed by Apollo for this act.

She is one of the fortune-tellers and diviners whom Dante sees in the fourth pit of the eighth circle of the Inferno.

== See also ==
- Niobe
- Cleite

== Sources ==
- Apollodorus, The Library with an English Translation by Sir James George Frazer, F.B.A., F.R.S. in 2 Volumes, Cambridge, MA, Harvard University Press; London, William Heinemann Ltd. 1921. ISBN 0-674-99135-4. Online version at the Perseus Digital Library. Greek text available from the same website.
- Käppel, Lutz, "Manto", in Brill's New Pauly: Encyclopaedia of the Ancient World. Antiquity, Volume 8, Lyd – Mine, edited by Hubert Cancik and Helmuth Schneider, Leiden, Brill, 2006. ISBN 9004122710.
- Publius Ovidius Naso, Metamorphoses translated by Brookes More (1859-1942). Boston, Cornhill Publishing Co. 1922. Online version at the Perseus Digital Library.
- Publius Ovidius Naso, Metamorphoses. Hugo Magnus. Gotha (Germany). Friedr. Andr. Perthes. 1892. Latin text available at the Perseus Digital Library.
- Publius Papinius Statius, The Thebaid translated by John Henry Mozley. Loeb Classical Library Volumes. Cambridge, MA, Harvard University Press; London, William Heinemann Ltd. 1928. Online version at the Topos Text Project.
- Publius Papinius Statius, The Thebaid. Vol I-II. John Henry Mozley. London: William Heinemann; New York: G.P. Putnam's Sons. 1928. Latin text available at the Perseus Digital Library.
- Strabo, The Geography of Strabo. Edition by H.L. Jones. Cambridge, Mass.: Harvard University Press; London: William Heinemann, Ltd. 1924. Online version at the Perseus Digital Library.
- Strabo, Geographica edited by A. Meineke. Leipzig: Teubner. 1877. Greek text available at the Perseus Digital Library.
