= Dolaplı, Karataş =

Dolaplı
- Neighbourhood
- Location in Turkey
- Coordinates: 36°42′N 35°15′E
- Country: Turkey
- Province: Adana
- District: Karataş
- Population (2022): 79
- Time zone: UTC+3 (TRT)

Dolaplı is a neighbourhood in the municipality and district of Karataş, Adana Province, Turkey. Its population was 79 as of 2022.
