= Çavuşlu, Karataş =

Çavuşlu
- Neighbourhood
- Location in Turkey
- Coordinates: 36°42′59″N 35°10′50″E
- Country: Turkey
- Province: Adana
- District: Karataş
- Population (2022): 234
- Time zone: UTC+3 (TRT)

Çavuşlu is a neighbourhood in the municipality and district of Karataş, Adana Province, Turkey. Its population is 234 (2022).
