= Meletmez, Karataş =

Meletmez
- Neighbourhood
- Location in Turkey
- Coordinates: 36°43′N 35°13′E
- Country: Turkey
- Province: Adana
- District: Karataş
- Population (2022): 88
- Time zone: UTC+3 (TRT)

Meletmez is a neighbourhood in the municipality and district of Karataş, Adana Province, Turkey. Its population is 88 (2022).
