= Karataş, Karataş =

Karataş
- Neighbourhood
- Location in Turkey
- Coordinates: 36°34′53″N 35°22′10″E
- Country: Turkey
- Province: Adana
- District: Karataş
- Population (2022): 236
- Time zone: UTC+3 (TRT)

Karataş is a neighbourhood in the municipality and district of Karataş, Adana Province, Turkey. Its population is 236 (2022).
