= Adalı, Karataş =

Adalı
- Neighbourhood
- Location in Turkey
- Coordinates: 36.6326°N 35.5726°E
- Country: Turkey
- Province: Adana
- District: Karataş
- Population (2022): 562
- Time zone: UTC+3 (TRT)

Adalı is a neighbourhood in the municipality and district of Karataş, Adana Province, Turkey. Its population is 562 (2022).
