= Kesik, Karataş =

Kesik
- Neighbourhood
- Location in Turkey
- Coordinates: 36°41′04″N 35°26′54″E
- Country: Turkey
- Province: Adana
- District: Karataş
- Population (2022): 298
- Time zone: UTC+3 (TRT)

Kesik is a neighbourhood in the municipality and district of Karataş, Adana Province, Turkey. Its population is 298 (2022).
