= Hacıhasan, Karataş =

Hacıhasan
- Neighbourhood
- Location in Turkey
- Coordinates: 36°43′47″N 35°16′26″E
- Country: Turkey
- Province: Adana
- District: Karataş
- Population (2022): 131
- Time zone: UTC+3 (TRT)

Hacıhasan is a neighbourhood in the municipality and district of Karataş, Adana Province, Turkey. Its population is 131 (2022).
