= Gölyaka, Karataş =

Coordinates: 36°35′32″N 35°22′06″E

Gölyaka
- Neighbourhood
- Location in Turkey
- Coordinates
- Country: Turkey
- Province: Adana
- District: Karataş
- Population (2022): 148
- Time zone: UTC+3 (TRT)

Gölyaka (also: Gölkaya) is a neighbourhood in the municipality and district of Karataş, Adana Province, Turkey. Its population is 148 (2022).
