= Kiremitli, Karataş =

Kiremitli
- Neighbourhood
- Location in Turkey
- Coordinates: 36°42′34″N 35°17′06″E
- Country: Turkey
- Province: Adana
- District: Karataş
- Population (2022): 97
- Time zone: UTC+3 (TRT)

Kiremitli is a neighbourhood in the municipality and district of Karataş, Adana Province, Turkey. Its population is 97 (2022).
