= Ataköy, Karataş =

Ataköy
- Neighbourhood
- Location in Turkey
- Coordinates: 36°45′19″N 35°06′52″E
- Country: Turkey
- Province: Adana
- District: Karataş
- Population (2022): 321
- Time zone: UTC+3 (TRT)

Ataköy is a neighbourhood in the municipality and district of Karataş, Adana Province, Turkey. Its population is 321 (2022).
