= Kırhasan, Karataş =

Kırhasan
- Neighbourhood
- Location in Turkey
- Coordinates: 36°41′N 35°19′E
- Country: Turkey
- Province: Adana
- District: Karataş
- Population (2022): 54
- Time zone: UTC+3 (TRT)

Kırhasan is a neighbourhood in the municipality and district of Karataş, Adana Province, Turkey. Its population is 54 (2022).
