= Kapı, Karataş =

Kapı
- Neighbourhood
- Location in Turkey
- Coordinates: 36°39′N 35°12′E
- Country: Turkey
- Province: Adana
- District: Karataş
- Population (2022): 268
- Time zone: UTC+3 (TRT)

Kapı is a neighbourhood in the municipality and district of Karataş, Adana Province, Turkey. Its population is 268 (2022).
