= Misis Mosaic Museum =

Museum in Adana, Turkey

Coordinates: 36°57′27″N 35°37′10″E

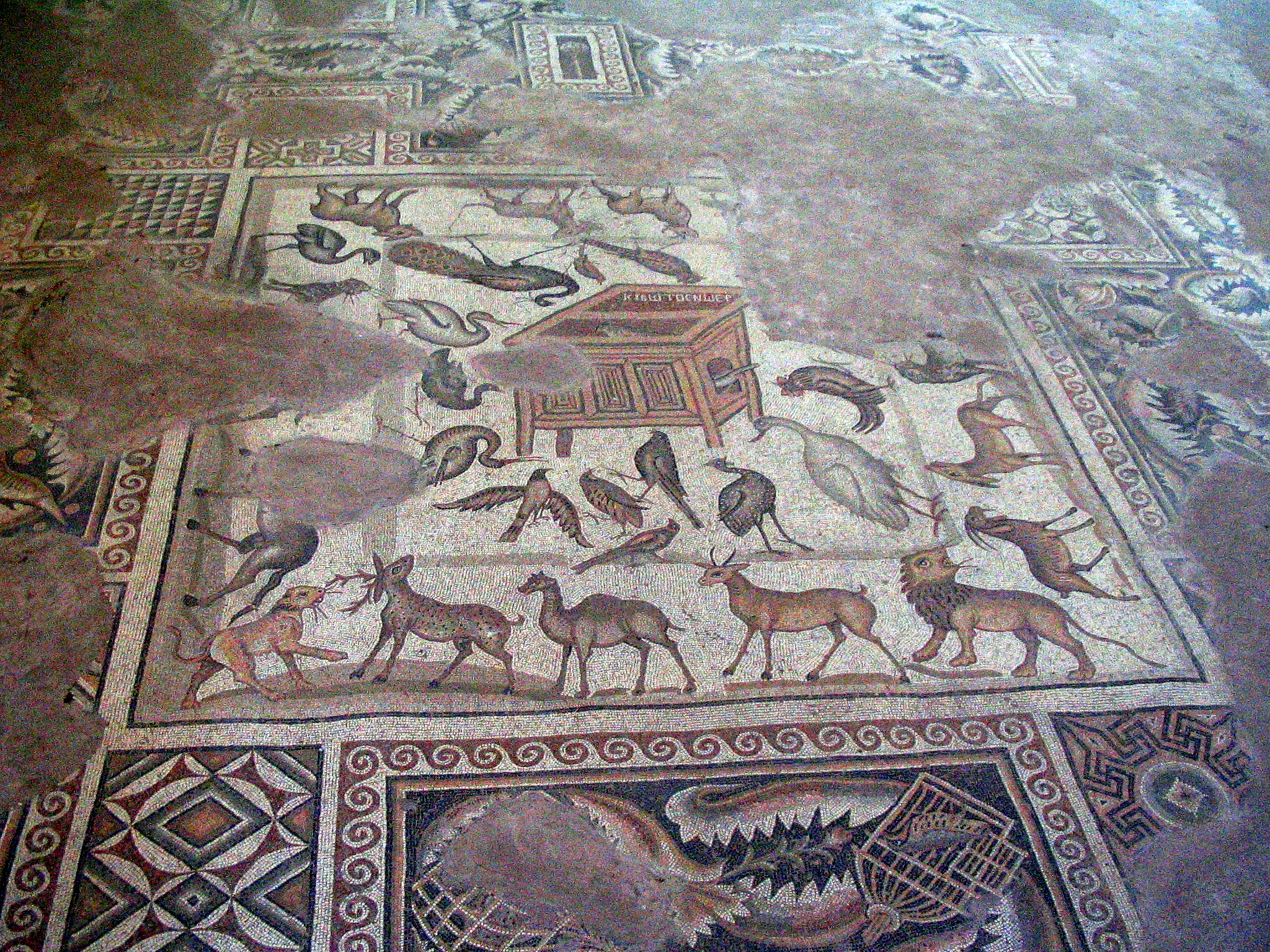
- Established: 1959
- Location: Yakapınar, Adana, Turkey
- Collection size: below 11,700 sq ft (1,100 m^{2})

Misis Mosaic Museum exhibits the works that were excavated from Misis Tumulus, most notable are the mosaics that were on the floor of a 4th-century temple in the ancient city of Misis. The museum is founded in 1959 in Yakapınar village on the far east end of Adana at the west bank of Ceyhan river.

At the museum various periods can be viewed in chronological order and floor mosaics belonging to a Basilica located within the boundaries of the Misis Ancient City is exhibited in situ. It was discovered in 1956 and the mosaic covered area was revealed by Theodor Bosset and Ludwig Budde from the German Archaeology Team who were carrying out excavations at that time at the Misis Mound. At the very centre of the composition there is a chicken coop built in the shape of a table or a side table surrounded by 23 birds or fowls taken by Noah onto his ship and behind this group there are various wild and domestic animals. It is from the 4th century.

Misis Mosaic Museum has been enriched with the transfer of works which were taken to the Adana Archeological Museum after the Misis Mound excavations and the mosaics which were previously kept there, and by bringing together the dispersed architectural elements found around the Misis.
