= Topraklı, Karataş =

Topraklı
- Neighbourhood
- Location in Turkey
- Coordinates: 36°40′14″N 35°19′24″E
- Country: Turkey
- Province: Adana
- District: Karataş
- Population (2022): 100
- Time zone: UTC+3 (TRT)

Topraklı is a neighbourhood in the municipality and district of Karataş, Adana Province, Turkey. Its population is 100 (2022).
