= Çağşırlı, Karataş =

Çağşırlı
- Neighbourhood
- Location in Turkey
- Coordinates: 36°45′N 35°25′E
- Country: Turkey
- Province: Adana
- District: Karataş
- Population (2022): 219
- Time zone: UTC+3 (TRT)

Çağşırlı is a neighbourhood in the municipality and district of Karataş, Adana Province, Turkey. Its population is 219 (2022).
