= Terliksiz, Karataş =

Terliksiz
- Neighbourhood
- Location in Turkey
- Coordinates: 36°42′N 35°20′E
- Country: Turkey
- Province: Adana
- District: Karataş
- Population (2022): 117
- Time zone: UTC+3 (TRT)

Terliksiz is a neighbourhood in the municipality and district of Karataş, Adana Province, Turkey. Its population is 117 (2022).
