= Proclus Mallotes =

Ancient Greek Stoic philosopher

Proclus (or Proklos) Mallotes (Greek: Πρόκλος Μαλλώτης) was a Stoic philosopher and a native of Mallus in Cilicia. According to the Suda he was the author of the following books:

- Commentary on the Sophisms of Diogenes (Greek: Ὑπόμνημα τῶν Διογένους σοφισμάτων)
- A treatise against Epicurus (Greek: Πρὸς Ἐπίκουρον)

His date is unknown; he probably lived at some point between the 1st century BC and the 3rd century AD. It is probably this Proclus who is mentioned by Proclus Diadochus.
