= Tuzkuyusu, Karataş =

Tuzkuyusu
- Neighbourhood
- Location in Turkey
- Coordinates: 36°43′55″N 35°05′33″E
- Country: Turkey
- Province: Adana
- District: Karataş
- Population (2022): 216
- Time zone: UTC+3 (TRT)

Tuzkuyusu is a neighbourhood in the municipality and district of Karataş, Adana Province, Turkey. Its population is 216 (2022).
