= Alcmaeon in Corinth =

Lost work by Greek playwright Euripides

- Written by: Euripides
- Chorus: believed to be female
- Characters: Alcmaeon; Amphilochus; Tisiphone; Merope; Apollo; Others?
- Original language: Ancient Greek
- Genre: Tragedy
- Setting: Corinth

Premiere
- Date premiered: 405 BC
- Place premiered: Athens

Alcmaeon in Corinth (Ancient Greek: Ἀλκμαίων ὁ διὰ Κορίνθου, Alkmaiōn ho dia Korinthou; also known as Alcmaeon at Corinth, Alcmaeon) is a play by Greek dramatist Euripides. It was first produced posthumously at the Dionysia in Athens, most likely in 405 BCE, in a trilogy with The Bacchae and Iphigenia in Aulis. The trilogy won first prize. Except for a few fragments, Alcmaeon in Corinth has been lost. Irish playwright Colin Teevan published a reconstruction of the play in 2005. Approximately 23 fragments covering about 40 lines of Alcmaeon in Corinth are extant and were incorporated by Teevan in his reconstruction, although it is not certain that all these fragments belong to this play. No complete scene has survived, nor has the cast of characters.

== Plot ==
What is known of the plot of Alcmaeon in Corinth is based on a summary in the Library of Pseudo-Apollodorus. According to this summary, during the time he went mad, Alcmaeon had a son, Amphilochus, and a daughter, Tisiphone, by Manto. Alcmaeon left the children to be raised by King Creon of Corinth. However, Creon's wife Merope, jealous of Tisiphone, sold her into slavery. Alcmaeon unknowingly purchased Tisiphone as a slave, and returned to Corinth with her. There, he was reunited with Amphilochus, who was later to be the founder of Amphilochian Argos.

The play began with a prologue narrated by the god Apollo during which he explained that although Manto did not have any children with him, she had two children by Alcmaeon. While Alcmaeon was in Corinth, there would have been a recognition scene in which Tisiphone's identity was revealed, probably by Merope. Based on one of the surviving fragments, Creon fled childless into exile after the true father of Amphilochus was revealed to be Alcmaeon rather than Creon.

The chorus was probably a group of women.

British classics scholar Edith Hall finds a possible thematic link between the three plays in the trilogy that included Alcmaeon in Corinth. Iphigenia in Aulis tells the story of King Agamemnon sacrificing his young daughter Iphigenia. The Bacchae tells the story of Agave killing her young adult son Pentheus. Similarly, Alcmaeon in Corinth incorporated the story of a parent's relationship with a youth.

Hall suggests that Alcmaeon in Corinth may have used at least a partially comic tone. This theory is based on a fragmentary dialogue exchange. One character, possibly Alcmaeon, says that he "killed his mother, to put it in a nutshell." Another character responds "Was this a consensual act, or were you both reluctant?" Aristotle comments that the play sets up the matricide in an absurd way (Nicomachean Ethics III.1, 1110a27-28).

== Fragments ==
According to Christopher Collard and Martin Cropp, only four fragments of more than a few words have been definitively assigned to Alcmaeon in Corinth. In fragment 73a, Apollo states that Manto had no children by him but had two by Alcmaeon. In fragment 74, upon Alcmaeon's arrival in Corinth, the chorus asks the stranger who has just arrived who he is. In fragment 75, a character, possibly Tisiphone or Alcmaeon, says to Amphilochus "Son of Creon, how true then it has proved, that from noble fathers noble children are born, and from base ones children resembling their father's nature." Fragment 76 tells of Creon fleeing into exile after Amphilochus is revealed to be Alcmaeon's son rather than Creon's.

In addition to these fragments, several extant fragments belong either to this play or to Euripides' earlier play Alcmaeon in Psophis (438 BCE), but the specific play to which they belong cannot be determined definitively or the assignment is not universally agreed upon.

== Themes ==
Alcmaeon in Corinth was written towards the end of the Peloponnesian War, which Athens was on the verge of losing. The play treats the king and queen of Athens' enemy Corinth negatively. On the other hand Amphilochus, the Argive founder of Athens' Peloponnesian ally Argos, is shown to have been falsely appropriated by Corinth.

== In popular culture ==
The supposed discovery of a manuscript of the play features as a plot device in the episode "The Lions of Nemea" of the British television series Lewis.
