= Auxentius of Mopsuestia =

Bishop of Mopsuestia until 360

Saint Auxentius of Mopsuestia
- Bishop of Mopsuestia
- Church: Early Christian Church
- Diocese: Mopsuestia
- Term ended: 360 AD

Personal details
- Died: 360 AD
- Denomination: Christianity
- Profession: Bishop

Sainthood
- Feast day: December 18
- Venerated in: Eastern Orthodox Church, Roman Catholic Church

Auxentius of Mopsuestia (Greek: Αὐξέντιος; died 360) was bishop of Mopsuestia and a saint in the Eastern Orthodox and Roman Catholic churches. His feast day is December 18. Baronius places Auxentius in the Roman Martyrology, because of the story told by Philostorgius (in the Suda) that he was at one time an officer in the army of Licinius, and gave up his commission rather than obey the imperial command to lay a bunch of grapes at the feet of a statue of Bacchus. Tillemont is inclined to believe that Auxentius was an Arian; his patronage of the heretic Aetius, points to this conclusion.
