= Çimeli, Karataş =

Çimeli
- Neighbourhood
- Location in Turkey
- Coordinates: 36°41′49″N 35°20′33″E
- Country: Turkey
- Province: Adana
- District: Karataş
- Population (2022): 310
- Time zone: UTC+3 (TRT)

Çimeli is a neighbourhood in the municipality and district of Karataş, Adana Province, Turkey. Its population is 310 (2022).
