= Tuzla, Karataş =

Tuzla
- Neighbourhood
- Location within Turkey
- Coordinates: 36.7007°N 35.0873°E
- Country: Turkey
- Province: Adana
- District: Karataş
- Population (2022): 1,874
- Time zone: UTC+3 (TRT)

Tuzla is a neighbourhood of the municipality and district of Karataş, Adana Province, Turkey. Its population is 1,874 (2022). Before the 2013 reorganisation, it was a town (belde).
