= Ixion in Heaven =

1832 novel by Benjamin Disraeli

- Author: Benjamin Disraeli
- Language: English
- Publisher: New Monthly Magazine
- Publication date: 1832/3
- Media type: Print

Ixion in Heaven is the fifth novel written by Benjamin Disraeli who would later become a Prime Minister of Great Britain.

== Background ==
Ixion in Heaven was published in two installments of the New Monthly Magazine in December 1832 and February 1833.

== Plot ==
Ixion, the king of Thessaly (famous for its horses), marries Dia, daughter of Deioneus who steals some of his horses. Ixion invites Deioneus to Larissa (his capital) where Deioneus accidentally (according to Ixion) falls in a pit, whilst walking with Ixion, and dies. Dia accuses Ixion of murder and he flees to a neighbouring kingdom where his account of events is also disbelieved, so Jupiter takes him to heaven.

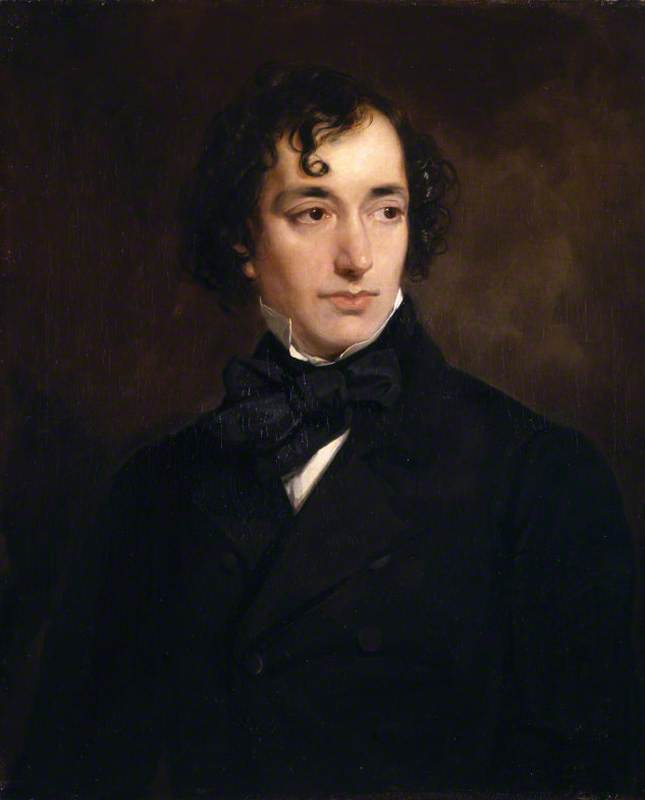
A retrospective portrayal (1852) of Disraeli as a young man when he wrote Ixion in Heaven

In heaven Ixion goes hunting with Mercury and at dinner meets various gods and goddesses including Apollo (a poet), his sister Diana and the Queen of Heaven, Juno, to whom he takes a fancy. Within three days, however, Ixion is unpopular with the likes of Mercury and Ganymede on account of his generally imperious behaviour. Ixion falls asleep in a field to be woken by Cupid to whom he confides his interest in Juno, who then appears on the scene. Cupid shoots his arrow through both their hearts. The couple are late for dinner, enraging Jupiter. After the meal Mercury and Ganymede tell Jupiter about Ixion's interest in Juno and all the gods head off in search of him. Cupid makes a cloud descend on the pavilion where Ixion is with Juno and in the fog secretly tells Juno to escape. When the cloud lifts, Ixion is alone and Jupiter then banishes him to Hades.

== Analysis ==
Ixion in Heaven is a contemporary revision of the myth of Ixion found in the Greek poet Pindar's Pythian Odes and in Apollonius Rhodius including Ixion's murder of his kin, the temptation of Juno, Juno's escape through a fog, and Jove's binding of Ixion to a wheel and casting him out of heaven.

When the novel was republished in 1853, Disraeli wrote that Jupiter represented George IV and Apollo Lord Byron. It has also been suggested that the novel depicts how Disraeli himself would have behaved in heaven.

== Reception ==
Disraeli’s father Isaac, also a novelist, considered Ixion in Heaven and its follow-up The Infernal Marriage which was published the following year as his son’s most original contribution to literature.

The novel was republished in 1926 as part of the Bradenham edition of all Disraeli’s novels, Philip Guedalia’s introduction describing it as “a blend of gaiety and Lemprière….its scheme, perhaps, and something of its tone were owed to Lucian.” Another review of the novel and two other early Disraeli works (Popanilla and The Infernal Marriage) which appeared at this time in The Spectator refers to Disraeli, “ invoking the satiric and the comic muse with a sure hand.”
