= Konaklı, Karataş =

Konaklı
- Neighbourhood
- Location in Turkey
- Coordinates: 36°40′N 35°08′E
- Country: Turkey
- Province: Adana
- District: Karataş
- Population (2022): 111
- Time zone: UTC+3 (TRT)

Konaklı (formerly: Tabur) is a neighbourhood in the municipality and district of Karataş, Adana Province, Turkey. Its population is 111 (2022).
