= Bebeli, Karataş =

Bebeli
- Neighbourhood
- Location in Turkey
- Coordinates: 36°38′N 35°29′E
- Country: Turkey
- Province: Adana
- District: Karataş
- Population (2022): 321
- Time zone: UTC+3 (TRT)

Bebeli is a neighbourhood in the municipality and district of Karataş, Adana Province, Turkey. Its population is 321 (2022).
