= İsahacılı, Karataş =

İsahacılı
- Neighbourhood
- Location in Turkey
- Coordinates: 36°41′N 35°17′E
- Country: Turkey
- Province: Adana
- District: Karataş
- Population (2022): 367
- Time zone: UTC+3 (TRT)

İsahacılı is a neighbourhood in the municipality and district of Karataş, Adana Province, Turkey. Its population is 367 (2022).
