= Yenimurat, Karataş =

Yenimurat
- Neighbourhood
- Location in Turkey
- Coordinates: 36°47′N 35°05′E
- Country: Turkey
- Province: Adana
- District: Karataş
- Population (2022): 112
- Time zone: UTC+3 (TRT)

Yenimurat is a neighbourhood in the municipality and district of Karataş, Adana Province, Turkey. Its population is 112 (2022).
