= Çakırören, Karataş =

Çakırören
- Neighbourhood
- Location in Turkey
- Coordinates: 36°37′N 35°22′E
- Country: Turkey
- Province: Adana
- District: Karataş
- Population (2022): 277
- Time zone: UTC+3 (TRT)

Çakırören is a neighbourhood in the municipality and district of Karataş, Adana Province, Turkey. Its population is 277 (2022).
