= Amphilochus I of Argos =

Ancient Greek mythological figure

In Greek mythology, Amphilochus (Ancient Greek: Ἀμφίλοχος, romanized: Amphílokhos, lit. 'he who is always on the alert' or 'surrounded by ambushes') was an Argive hero and one of the Epigoni.

== Family ==
Amphilochus was the son of Amphiaraus and Eriphyle and the younger brother of Alcmaeon.

== Mythology ==
Eriphyle, bribed by Polynices with the necklace of the goddess Harmonia, persuaded her husband Amphiaraus to join the expedition of the Seven against Thebes. Amphiaraus, knowing that he would die in the battle, reluctantly agreed to go but asked his two sons to avenge his foreseen death. At Thebes, Amphiaraus ended up in combat with Periclymenus, a demigod son of Poseidon. He attempted to flee but the god Zeus threw a bolt of lightning which opened the earth beneath him, swallowing the Argive and his chariot. Amphilochus's brother Alcmaeon then slew his mother and exiled himself from the kingdom.

As king of Argos, Amphilochus was sometimes named among Helen's suitors.

After the Trojan War, he was generally said to have abandoned his former realm and to have eventually settled the territory along the Ambracian Gulf, which became known as Amphilochia in his honor. Its capital was a second Argos, which is distinguished as the Amphilochian Argos. (Others credit this settlement to his nephew.) In fact, the area seems to have been a non-Greek settlement that was later Hellenized by its Ambraciot neighbors.

Like his father before him, Amphilochus had a reputation as a seer and was also credited with founding several oracles. The most important was at Mallus in Cilicia, although this also seems to have been a pre-Greek settlement. Another was the oracle of Apollo at Colophon in Lydia, which Amphilochus was said to have founded with his half-brother Mopsus, the son of Amphiaraus and Manto. Herodotus also credited Amphilochus with the establishment of Posideium on Syria's Cilician border.

Amphilochus was variously said to have been killed by Apollo or to have simultaneously killed and been killed by his half-brother Mopsus. Either story was also sometimes ascribed to his nephew instead.
