= Damlapınar, Karataş =

Damlapınar
- Neighbourhood
- Location in Turkey
- Coordinates: 36°46′39″N 35°07′32″E
- Country: Turkey
- Province: Adana
- District: Karataş
- Population (2022): 324
- Time zone: UTC+3 (TRT)

Damlapınar is a neighbourhood in the municipality and district of Karataş, Adana Province, Turkey. Its population is 324 (2022).
