= Amphilochus II of Argos =

Ancient Greek mythological figure

Amphilochus (Ancient Greek: Ἀμφίλοχος Amphílokhos) was a figure in Greek mythology.

== Family ==
According to a story ascribed to a lost work by Euripides by the Bibliotheca, this Amphilochus was the son of Alcmaeon, one of the Epigoni, and Manto, the daughter of the Theban seer Teiresias. He was the nephew of a different Amphilochus, and the brother of Tisiphone.

== Mythology ==
In Euripides's lost play Alcmaeon in Corinth, Manto is sent to Delphi and then to Caria. Alcmaeon entrusts young Amphilochus and his sister Tisiphone to king Creon of Corinth, but Creon's queen sells the girl into slavery. Alcmaeon eventually discovers this and recovers both children.

According to Apollodorus, Amphilochus founded Amphilochian Argos, although this is usually attributed to his uncle.
