= Sarımsaklı, Karataş =

Sarımsaklı
- Neighbourhood
- Location in Turkey
- Coordinates: 36°41′02″N 35°08′10″E
- Country: Turkey
- Province: Adana
- District: Karataş
- Population (2022): 25
- Time zone: UTC+3 (TRT)

Sarımsaklı is a neighbourhood in the municipality and district of Karataş, Adana Province, Turkey. Its population is 25 (2022).
