= Rhacius =

Cretan son of Lebes who settled in Caria

In Greek mythology, Rhacius /ˈreɪʃəs/ (Ancient Greek: Ῥάκιος) was the Cretan son of Lebes, who led a group of Greek settlers to Colophon in Asia Minor. With his wife Manto, daughter of the seer Tiresias, he became the father of Mopsus, a renowned seer.
