= Kızıltahta, Karataş =

Kızıltahta
- Neighbourhood
- Location in Turkey
- Coordinates: 36°45′N 35°29′E
- Country: Turkey
- Province: Adana
- District: Karataş
- Elevation: 16 m (52 ft)
- Population (2022): 191
- Time zone: UTC+3 (TRT)

Kızıltahta is a neighbourhood in the municipality and district of Karataş, Adana Province, Turkey. Its population is 191 (2022).
