= Kırıt, Tarsus =

Kırıt
- Neighbourhood
- Location in Turkey
- Coordinates: 37°05′N 34°54′E
- Country: Turkey
- Province: Mersin
- District: Tarsus
- Elevation: 370 m (1,210 ft)
- Population (2022): 167
- Time zone: UTC+3 (TRT)
- Area code: 0324

Kırıt is a neighbourhood in the municipality and district of Tarsus, Mersin Province, Turkey. Its population is 167 (2022). It is situated in the southern slopes of the Toros Mountains. Turkish state highway D.750 is to the east of the village. It is 27 kilometres (17 mi) away from Tarsus and 55 kilometres (34 mi) away from Mersin.
