= Karataş =

- District and municipality
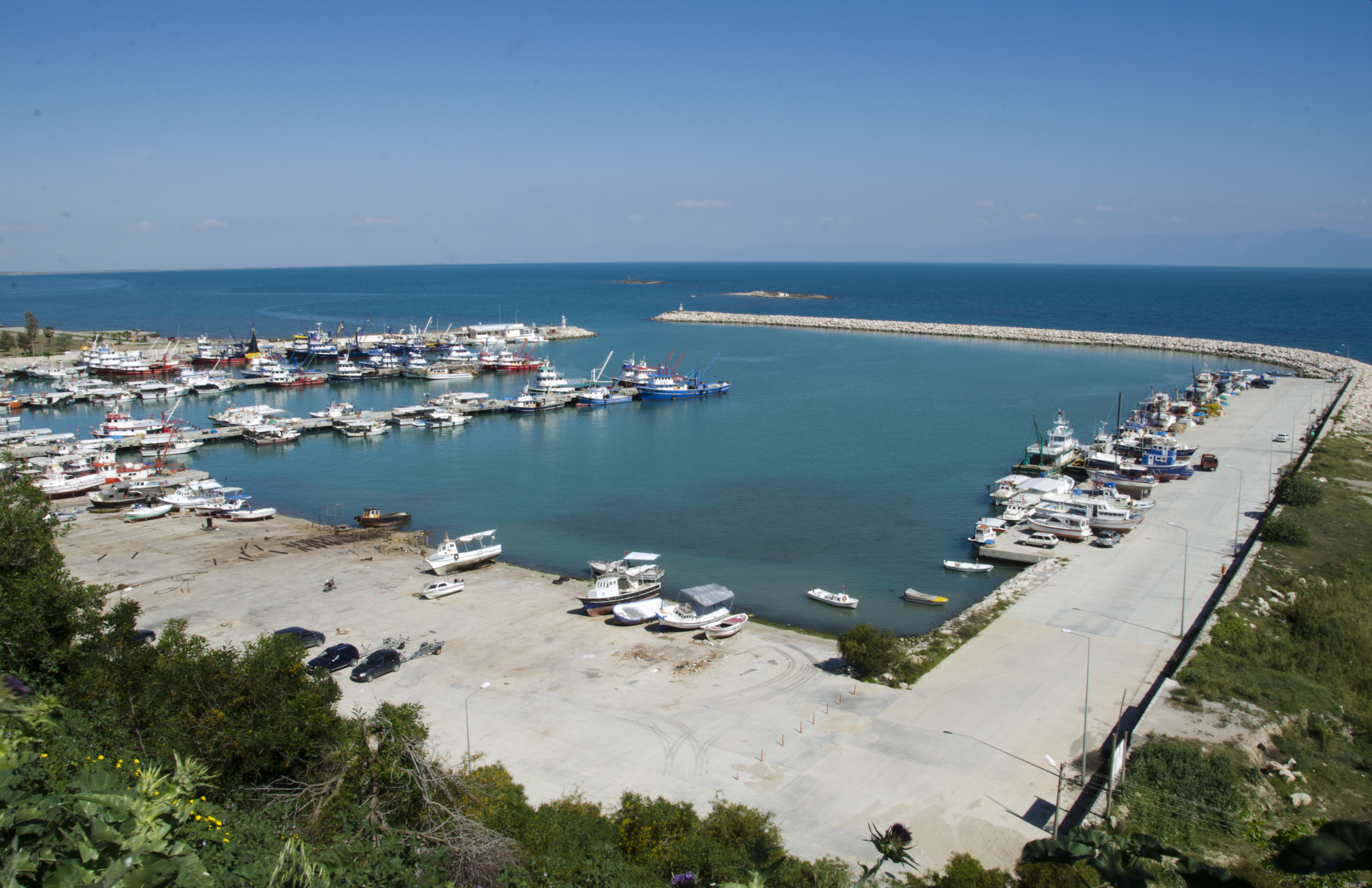

- Map showing Karataş District in Adana Province

- Location within Turkey
- Coordinates: 36°33′45″N 35°22′49″E
- Country: Turkey
- Province: Adana

Government
  - Mayor: Ali Bedrettin Karataş (CHP)
- Area: 862 km^{2} (333 sq mi)
- Elevation: 10 m (33 ft)
- Population (2022): 23,499
  - Density: 27.3/km^{2} (70.6/sq mi)
- Time zone: UTC+3 (TRT)
- Postal code: 01900
- Area code: 0322
- Website: www.karatas.bel.tr

Karataş (Turkish for black stone) is a municipality and district of Adana Province, Turkey. Its area is 862 km^{2}, and its population is 23,499 (2022). The town itself has 10,293 inhabitants. It is on the Mediterranean coast of Turkey, 47 km from the city of Adana, between the rivers Seyhan and Ceyhan, the Pyramos of Antiquity.

== History ==
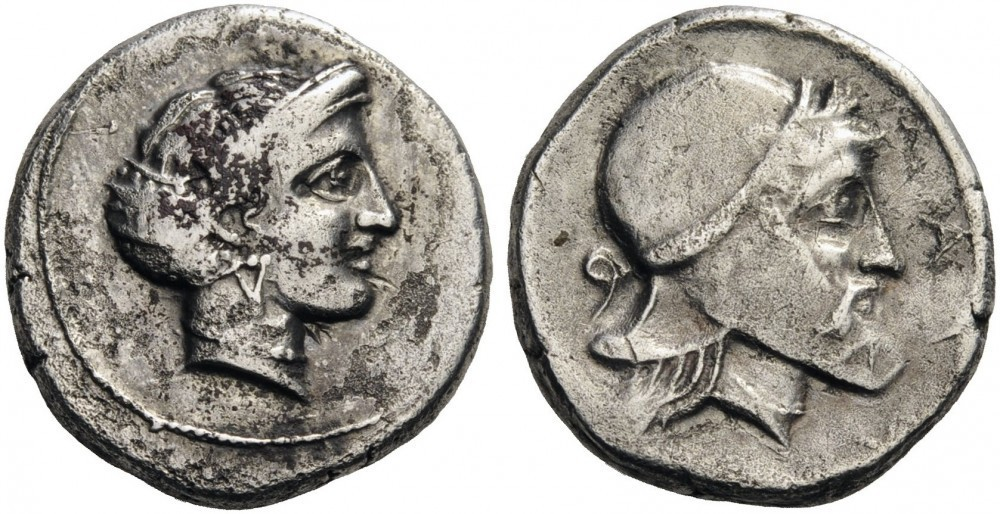
Coins belonging to the ancient city of Mallos, which was an ancient city established at the mouth of the Ceyhan river within the borders of the Kızıltahta village of today's Adana/Karataş district.

The area has been inhabited from at least Hittite times and probably earlier.

=== Iron Age ===
==== Assyrian period ====
It was later part of the Assyrian province of Quwê (Que). By the time of the Greeks, who knew the city as Megarsos/Magarso, there was a port here at the mouth of the navigable Pyramos, supplying an important military and trading route into the plain of Cilicia, and also providing access to the sea for the river towns, like Mallus.

==== Hellenstic period ====
In 333 BCE, just before the battle of Issus, Alexander the Great sacrificed here at a temple that, by interpretatio graeca, he took to be of Athena; the "Athena of Magarsos" who appears on Hellenistic coins has been diagnosed, from her pose and the attributes that surround her, to have Mesopotamian connections. Robin Lane Fox recognizes the origin of the cult site in the victories of Sennacherib, who instituted the shrine in 696 BCE following a sea battle with Greeks off the mouth of the river; he dedicated it to his martial goddess, Anat, or Ishtar.

==== Roman period and later ====
The Romans rendered Magarsos as Megarsus. The port was later conquered by the Arab armies during the growth of Islam and then later by the Seljuk Turks, various Turkoman principalities and eventually by the Ottomans in 1517.

Karataş was occupied by French troops during World War I. They were later expelled by Turkish militia forces during the Franco-Turkish War as part of the Turkish War of Independence.

== Composition ==
There are 43 neighbourhoods in Karataş District:

- Adalı
- Ataköy
- Bahçe
- Bebeli
- Çağşırlı
- Çakırören
- Çavuşlu
- Çimeli
- Çukurkamış
- Damlapınar
- Develiören
- Dolaplı
- Gölyaka
- Hacıhasan
- Hasırağacı
- Helvacı
- İnnaplıhüyüğü
- İsahacılı
- Kapı
- Karagöçer
- Karataş
- Karşıyaka
- Kemaliye
- Kesik
- Kiremitli
- Kırhasan
- Kızıltahta
- Konaklı
- Meletmez
- Orta
- Oymaklı
- Sarımsaklı
- Sirkenli
- Tabaklar
- Terliksiz
- Topraklı
- Tuzkuyusu
- Tuzla
- Yassıören
- Yemişli
- Yeni
- Yenimurat
- Yüzbaşı

== Climate ==
Karataş has a hot-summer Mediterranean climate (Köppen: Csa), with hot, muggy, yet virtually rainless summers, and mild, rainy winters.

Climate data for Karataş (1991–2020)
| Month | Jan | Feb | Mar | Apr | May | Jun | Jul | Aug | Sep | Oct | Nov | Dec | Year |
|---|---|---|---|---|---|---|---|---|---|---|---|---|---|
| Mean daily maximum °C (°F) | 14.9 (58.8) | 15.9 (60.6) | 18.6 (65.5) | 21.7 (71.1) | 25.2 (77.4) | 28.2 (82.8) | 30.5 (86.9) | 31.5 (88.7) | 30.5 (86.9) | 27.7 (81.9) | 21.9 (71.4) | 16.6 (61.9) | 23.6 (74.5) |
| Daily mean °C (°F) | 10.2 (50.4) | 11.3 (52.3) | 14.3 (57.7) | 17.6 (63.7) | 21.5 (70.7) | 25.1 (77.2) | 27.6 (81.7) | 28.6 (83.5) | 26.6 (79.9) | 22.6 (72.7) | 16.4 (61.5) | 11.8 (53.2) | 19.5 (67.1) |
| Mean daily minimum °C (°F) | 6.1 (43.0) | 6.9 (44.4) | 10.0 (50.0) | 13.4 (56.1) | 17.6 (63.7) | 21.9 (71.4) | 25.1 (77.2) | 25.8 (78.4) | 22.6 (72.7) | 17.7 (63.9) | 11.6 (52.9) | 7.8 (46.0) | 15.6 (60.1) |
| Average precipitation mm (inches) | 135.1 (5.32) | 116.83 (4.60) | 62.94 (2.48) | 38.59 (1.52) | 33.93 (1.34) | 12.11 (0.48) | 4.77 (0.19) | 4.52 (0.18) | 19.7 (0.78) | 50.81 (2.00) | 111.95 (4.41) | 187.4 (7.38) | 778.65 (30.66) |
| Average precipitation days (≥ 1.0 mm) | 9.0 | 8.6 | 6.2 | 4.5 | 3.0 | 2.2 | 1.2 | 1.1 | 2.7 | 4.7 | 5.6 | 9.3 | 58.1 |
| Average relative humidity (%) | 63.1 | 63.3 | 64.9 | 68.5 | 70.3 | 72.3 | 73.7 | 71.8 | 65.3 | 59.6 | 56.5 | 63.0 | 66.1 |
Source: NOAA

== Places of interest ==
- The ruins of churches, caravanserai, and an amphitheatre. However the ancient monuments remain to date in lack of proper research or preservation.
- The inlet of Akyatan is a breeding ground for many birds and the sea turtle species Chelonia mydas and Caretta caretta. Karataş is particularly important for the latter, which is an endangered species that lays eggs primarily in Akyatan, another beach in neighboring Yumurtalık district and İztuzu Beach in Dalyan in southwestern Turkey.

== Karataş today ==
Today Karataş is known for its fishing industry and as a place that Adana's inhabitants can easily access to relax on the beach. There are also rich farmlands behind the coast where cotton, watermelons, melons and other crops are grown.

The well-known footballer Hasan Şaş is from Karataş and has a street named after him in memory of his excellent performance for Turkey national football team during the 2002 World Cup.

Brussels-based painter Nazife Can is also from Karataş.
