= Mopsus (Argonaut) =

Son of Ampyx in Greek mythology

In Greek mythology, Mopsus or Mopsos (/ˈmɒpsəs/; Ancient Greek: Μόψος, romanized: Mópsos) was the Lapith son of Ampyx and a nymph (sometimes named as Chloris and sometimes named Aregonis), born at Titaressa in Thessaly, was also a seer and augur. In Thessaly the place name Mopsion recalled his own. The earliest evidence of him is inscribed on the strap of a soldier's shield, found at Olympia and dated c.600–575 BC.

== Mythology ==
This Mopsus was one of two seers among the Argonauts, and was said to understand the language of birds, having learned augury from Apollo. He had competed at the funeral-games for Jason's father and was among the Lapiths who fought the Centaurs. While fleeing across the Libyan desert from angry sisters of the slain Gorgon Medusa, Mopsus died from the bite of a viper that had grown from a drop of Medusa's blood. Medea was unable to save him, even by magical means. The Argonauts buried him with a monument by the sea, and a temple was later erected on the site.

Ovid places him also at the hunt of the Calydonian Boar, although the hunt occurred after the Argonauts' return and Mopsus' supposed death.
