= Mopsus =

Seer in Greek mythology

Mopsus or Mopsos (/ˈmɒpsəs/; Ancient Greek: Μόψος, romanized: Mópsos) was the name of one of two famous seers in Greek mythology; his rival being Calchas. A historical or legendary Mopsos or Mukšuš may have been the founder of a house in power at widespread sites in the coastal plains of Pamphylia and Cilicia (in today's Turkey) during the Early Iron Age.

Mopsus was considered to be the son of Manto either by Rhacius or Apollo. The earliest mention of Mopsus in ancient Greek sources is in Callinus of Ephesos and Hesiod.

== Other mythological figures ==
- Mopsus, an Argonaut and son of Ampyx by a nymph.
- Mopsus, a Thracian commander who lived long before the Trojan War. Along with Sipylus the Scythian, this Mopsus had been driven into exile from Thrace by its king Lycurgus. Sometime later, he and Sipylus defeated the Amazons in a pitched battle, in which their queen Myrine was slain, and the Thracians pursued the surviving Amazons all the way to Libya.
- Mopsus is also the name chosen by Virgil for the young singer who makes a song about the death of Daphnis in Eclogue 5. The name recurs in Eclogue 8 as the rival who is to marry Nysa, beloved of the singer Damon.

== Origin of the name ==
The name Mókʷsos is attested in Linear B tablets from Knossos and Pylos, while a figure named ᵐMu-uk-šú-uš, possibly connected with Ahhiya(wa), appears in the so-called Indictment of Madduwatta, dated to the late 15th or early 14th century BC. The name Mopsos is probably of Greek origin rather than Anatolian, since its expected form in Hittite or Luwian would have been Mukussa or Mukussu. The relationship between the earlier form Muksa, preserved in Luwian transmission, and the later form M-p-š / Mopsos, preserved in Phoenician transmission, is indicative of the evolution of Greek labiovelars and can hardly be explained otherwise.

While Greek sources consistently describe Mopsus as a Greek figure, the name Muksos was also in use in Early Iron Age Anatolia, as evidenced by its inscription on one of the wooden beams of Tumulus MM at Gordion (c. 740 BC). Additionally, the Lydian historiographer Xanthus portrayed Mopsus as a Lydian engaged in military campaigns in Phoenicia.

== Historical person ==
Since the discovery of a bilingual Hieroglyphic Luwian-Phoenician inscription in Karatepe (in Cilicia) in 1946–1947, it has been conjectured that Mopsos was a historical person. The inscription is dated to c. 700 BC, and the person speaking in it, -z-t-w-d (Phoenician) and Azatiwada (Luwian), professes to be king of the d-n-n-y-m / Hiyawa, and describes his dynasty as "the house of M-p-š / Muksa". Apparently, he is a descendant of Mopsus. Furthermore, the name Mopsus appears in both the İncirli inscription and the Çineköy inscription, where it is written as mp[š] in Phoenician. In the Çineköy inscription, the corresponding Hieroglyphic Luwian form is Muk]sas. Both inscriptions mention King Awarikus and date to the 8th century BC.

The Phoenician name of the people recalls one of the Homeric names of the Greeks, Danaoi with the -m plural, whereas the Luwian name Hiyawa probably goes back to Hittite Ahhiyā(wa), which is, according to most interpretations, the "Achaean", or Mycenaean Greek, settlement in Asia Minor. Ancient Greek authors ascribe a central role to Mopsus in the colonization of Pamphylia.

According to Greek mythology, Mopsus led a group of settlers eastward along the southern Anatolian coast, passing through Pamphylia and Cilicia, where his name is attested in both Luwian and Phoenician inscriptions. Some scholars associate Mopsus' movements along the southern coast of Asia Minor and the Levant with the activities of the Sea Peoples, who attacked Egypt at the beginning of the 12th century BC. Among these groups was the Denyen, often compared to the d-n-n-y-m in the above mentioned Karatepe inscription. According to this view, Mopsus may have been a leader of one of these migratory groups active during the collapse of Bronze Age civilizations. However, this identification with the Sea Peoples is debated, and several scholars question the reliability of linking Mopsus to these events on philological or historical grounds.
