= Tiresias =

Blind prophet of Apollo

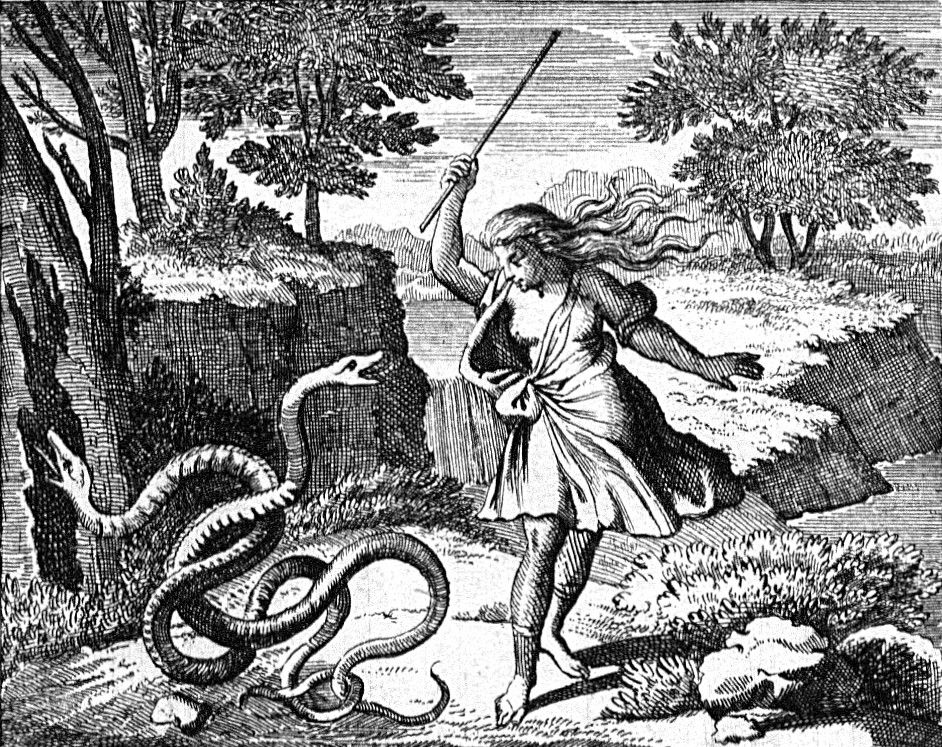
Tiresias strikes two snakes with a stick, and is transformed into a woman. Engraving by Johann Ulrich Kraus c. 1690. Taken from Die Verwandlungen des Ovidii (The Metamorphoses of Ovid).

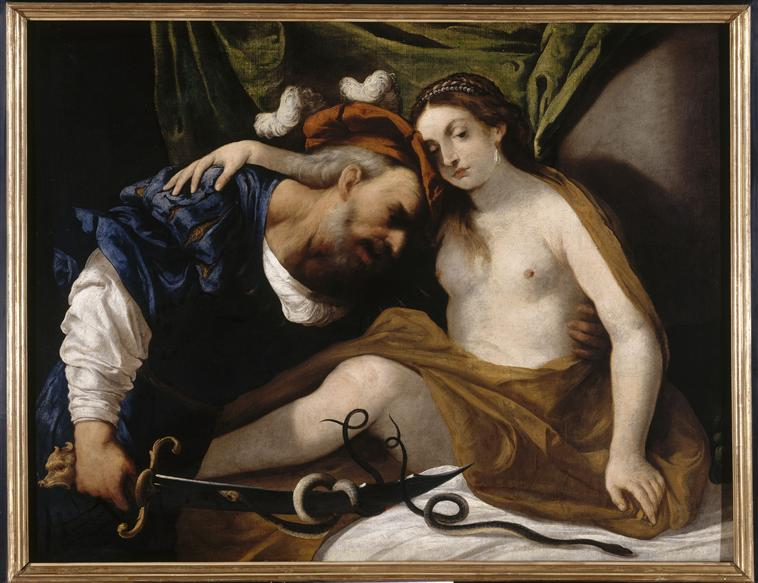
Pietro della Vecchia, Tiresias Transformed into a Woman, 17th century.

In Greek mythology, Tiresias (/taɪˈriːsiəs/; Ancient Greek: Τειρεσίας, romanized: Teiresías) was a blind prophet of Apollo in Thebes, famous for clairvoyance and for being transformed into a woman for seven years. He was the son of the shepherd Everes and the nymph Chariclo. Tiresias participated fully in seven generations in Thebes, beginning as advisor to Cadmus, the founder of Thebes.

== Mythology ==
Eighteen allusions to mythic Tiresias, noted by Luc Brisson, fall into three groups: the first recounts Tiresias's sex-change episode and later his encounter with Zeus and Hera; the second group recounts his blinding by Athena; the third, all but lost, seems to have recounted the misadventures of Tiresias.

=== Sex-change ===
On Mount Cyllene in the Peloponnese, (Note: Eustathius and John Tzetzes place this episode on Mount Cithaeron in Boeotia, near the territory of Thebes.) Tiresias came upon a pair of copulating snakes and hit them with his stick, upon which he was transformed into a woman. Afterwards, as told by Phlegon, god of prophecy Apollo informed Tiresias: if she spots copulating snakes and similarly harms them, she will return to her previous form. After seven years as a woman, (Note: The period referenced from Ovid's Metamorphoses.) Tiresias found mating snakes; depending on the myth, she either made sure to leave the snakes alone this time, or, according to Hyginus and Phlegon, trampled them. In both outcomes, Tiresias was released from the sentence and changed back to a man. (Note: At the account of Eustathius and Tzetzes, "it was by killing the female snake that Tiresias became a woman, and it was by afterwards killing the male snake that he was changed back into a man.")

According to Eustathius, Tiresias was originally a woman who promised Apollo her favours in exchange for musical lessons, only to reject him afterwards. She was turned by Apollo into a man, then again a woman under unclear circumstances, then a man by the offended Hera, then into a woman by Zeus. She became a man once again after an encounter with the Muses, until finally Aphrodite turned him into a woman again and then into a mouse.

=== Blindness and gift of prophecy ===
The mythographic compendium Bibliotheke, lists different stories about the possible cause of Tiresias's blindness. One legend says he was "blinded by the gods because he revealed their secrets to men". While Pherecydes and Callimachus's fifth hymn, The Baths of Pallas, provided a different story—"the youthful Tiresias" was blinded by Athena after he came to sate his thirst at the bubbling spring, where Athena and her favourite attendant, the nymph Chariclo (mother of Tiresias) were enjoying a "cool plunge in the fair-flowing spring of Hippocrene on Mount Helicon". Pherecydes, in particular, finishes the story with Tiresias's mother Chariclo begging Athena to undo the curse, but she "could not do so". Instead, Athena "cleansed his ears", giving him the ability to understand birdsong (gift of augury), and granted him a staff of cornel-wood, "wherewith he walked like those who see". (Note: The latter version, readable as a doublet of the Actaeon mytheme, was preferred by the English poets Tennyson and even Swinburne.) In the version retold by Callimachus, Athena cried out in anger at the sight of Tiresias, and his eyes were "quenched in darkness". After Chariclo "reproached the goddess with blinding her son, Athena explained that she had not done so, but that the laws of the gods inflicted the penalty of blindness on anyone who beheld an immortal without his or her consent." To give Tiresias solace in his grief, Athena "promised to bestow on him the gifts of prophecy and divination, long life, and after death the retention of his mental powers undimmed" by the underworld. (Note: James George Frazer remarks that Callimachus's account "probably followed Pherecydes".)

On another account behind Tiresias's blindness and his gift, (Note: This account has been briefly mentioned by Hyginus, Fabula 75; Ovid treated it at length in Metamorphoses III.) he was drawn into an argument between goddess Hera and her husband Zeus, arguing whether "the pleasures of love are felt more by women or by men", with Hera taking the side of men, Zeus putting himself in opposition, and Tiresias making the final judgement as someone who had experienced both pleasures. Tiresias said, "Of ten parts a man enjoys one only; But a woman enjoys the full ten parts in her heart". Hera struck him blind, but Zeus, in recompense, gave Tiresias the gift of foresight (Note: The blind prophet with inner sight as recompense for blindness is a familiar mytheme.) and a lifespan of "seven ordinary lives".

Like other oracles, the circumstances in which Tiresias received his prophecies varied. Sometimes he would receive visions, listen for the songs of birds, or burn offerings or entrails, interpreting prophecies through pictures that appeared in the smoke. Pliny the Elder credited Tiresias with the invention of augury. Journalist William Godwin highlighted the communications with the dead as his most valuable way to tell a prophecy, constraining the dead "to appear and answer his inquiries". (Note: Godwin referenced Statius's poem Thebaid.)

His daughter Manto also possessed the gift of prophecy.

=== Other myths ===
In Ovid's Metamorphoses, Tiresias's "fame of prophecy was spread through all the cities of Aonia", and nymph Liriope was the first to request his prophecy, asking him about the future of her son Narcissus. Tiresias predicted that the boy would live a long life only if he never "came to know himself".

Tiresias has been a recurring character in stories and Greek tragedies concerning the legendary history of Thebes.

- In Euripides's The Bacchae, Tiresias and Cadmus, the founder and former king of Thebes, joined the ritual festivities of Dionysus in the mountains near Thebes. Cadmus's petulant young grandson Pentheus, the current king, observed the scene, disgusted to find the two old men in festival dress, he scolded them and ordered his soldiers to arrest anyone engaging in Dionysian worship.
- In Sophocles's Oedipus Rex, the city of Thebes was struck by a plague of infertility, affecting crops, livestock, and the people. King Oedipus asserted that he would end the pestilence. He sent Creon, the brother of his consort, to the Oracle at Delphi, seeking guidance. When Creon returned, Oedipus learned that the tragic death of the previous king Laius brought the plague, and his murder must be brought to justice to save the city. Creon also suggested that they try to find Tiresias, who was widely respected. Oedipus sent for Tiresias, and Tiresias admitted to knowing the answers to Oedipus's questions, but he refused to speak, instead telling Oedipus to abandon his search. Angered by the seer's reply, Oedipus accused him of complicity in Laius's murder, which offended Tiresias. Tiresias revealed to the king that "you yourself are the criminal you seek". Oedipus did not understand how this could be, and supposed that Creon must have paid Tiresias to accuse him. The two argued vehemently, and Jocasta entered and tried to calm Oedipus by telling him the story of her first-born son and his supposed death. Oedipus became nervous as he realized that he may have murdered Laius and so brought about the plague. The prophet left.
- In Sophocles's Antigone, Creon, now king of Thebes, refused to allow the burial of Creon's nephew Polynices and decreed to bury alive his niece, Antigone, for defying the order. Tiresias warned him that Polynices should be urgently buried because the gods were displeased, refusing to accept any sacrifices or prayers from Thebes. However, Creon accused Tiresias of being corrupt. Tiresias responded that Creon would lose "a son of [his] own loins" for the crimes of leaving Polynices unburied and putting Antigone into the earth. Tiresias also prophesied that all of Greece would despise Creon and that the sacrificial offerings of Thebes would not be accepted by the gods. The leader of the Chorus, terrified, asked Creon to take Tiresias's advice to free Antigone and bury Polynices. Creon assented, leaving with a retinue of men.
- According to Hyginus and Statius, during the reign of Eteocles, the son of Oedipus, the city of Thebes has been attacked by Seven against Thebes and laid siege to the city. Tiresias foretold that if anyone from the Spartoi perish freely as sacrifice to Ares, Thebes would be freed from disaster. Creon's son Menoeceus ended his own life by throwing himself from the walls, and Thebes ultimately emerged victorious.

=== Death ===
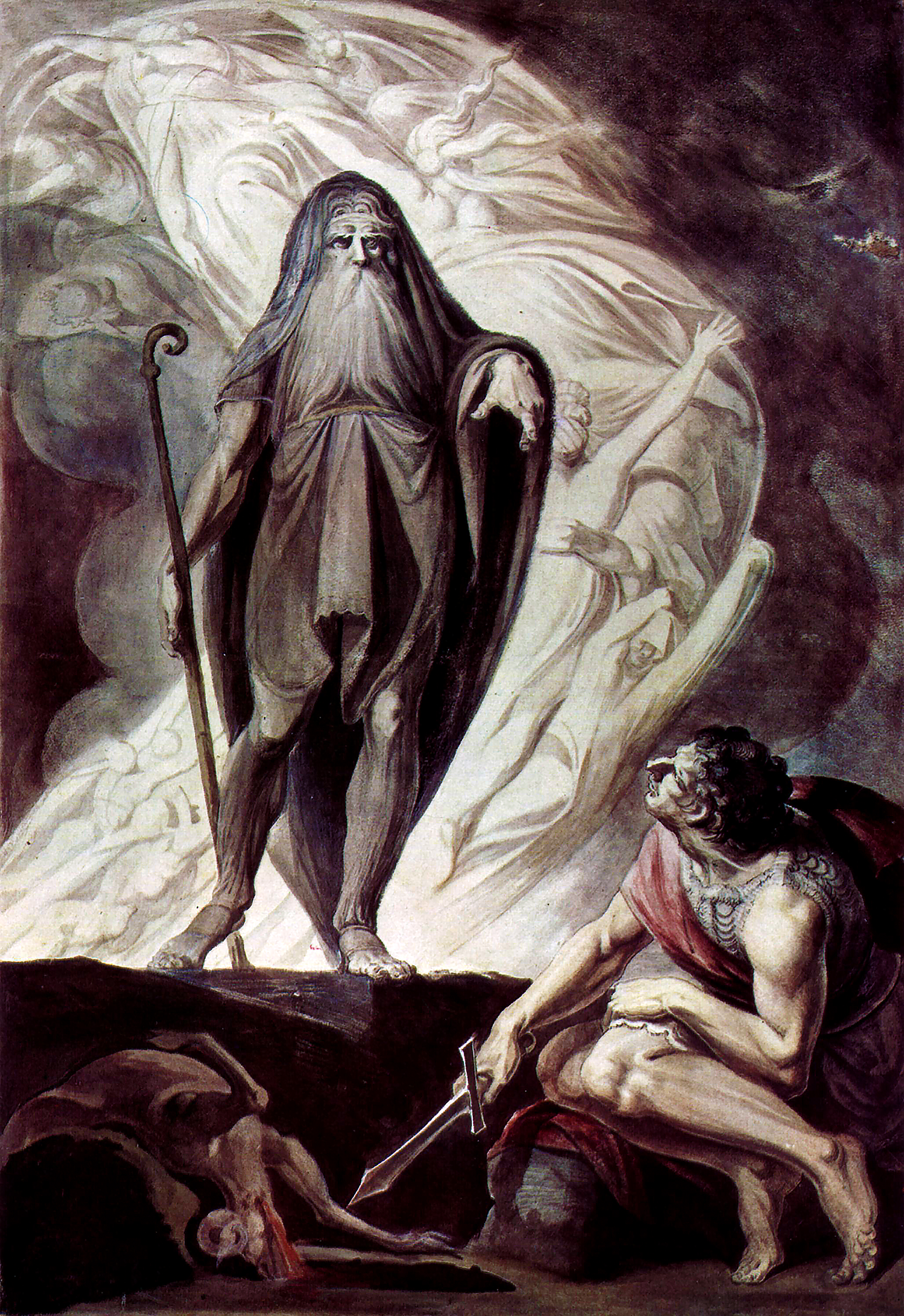
Tiresias appears to Odysseus during the nekyia of Odyssey Book XI, in this watercolor with tempera by the Anglo-Swiss Johann Heinrich Füssli, c. 1780–85.

Tiresias died after drinking water from the tainted spring Tilphussa, where he was impaled by an arrow of Apollo. As claimed by Pausanias, the tomb of Tiresias was "ordinarily pointed out in the vicinity" of the Tilphusan Well near Thebes, Greece, while Pliny the Elder wrote that his burial site was located in Macedonia, marked with a monument.

His shade descended to the Asphodel Meadows, the first level of Hades. Persephone allowed Tiresias to retain his powers of clairvoyance after death.

After his death, the spirit of Tiresias was summoned from the underworld by Odysseus's sacrificial offering of a black sheep. Tiresias told Odysseus that he could return home if he was able to stay himself and his crew from eating the sacred livestock of Helios on the island of Thrinacia and that failure to do so would result in the loss of his ship and his entire crew. Odysseus's men, however, did not follow the advice and were killed by Zeus's thunderbolts during a storm.

The souls inhabiting the underworld were usually required to drink the blood to become conscious again, but Tiresias was able to see Odysseus without drinking the blood. According to historian Marina Warner, it meant Tiresias remained sentient even in death—"he comes up to Odysseus and recognizes him and calls him by name before he has drunk the black blood of the sacrifice; even Odysseus' own mother cannot accomplish this, but must drink deep before her ghost can see her son for herself."

== Analysis ==
As a seer, "Tiresias" was "a common title for soothsayers throughout Greek legendary history". In Greek literature, Tiresias's pronouncements are always given in short maxims which are often cryptic (gnomic), but never wrong. Often when his name is attached to a mythic prophecy, it is introduced simply to supply a personality to the generic example of a seer, not by any inherent connection of Tiresias with the myth: thus it is Tiresias who tells Amphitryon of Zeus and Alcmena and warns the mother of Narcissus that the boy will thrive as long as he never knows himself. This is his emblematic role in tragedy. Like most oracles, he is generally extremely reluctant to offer the whole of what he sees in his visions.

Tiresias is presented as a complex liminal figure, mediating between humankind and the gods, male and female, blind and seeing, present and future, this world and the Underworld. (Note: Fully explored in structuralist mode, with many analogies drawn from ambivalent sexualities considered to exist among animals in Antiquity.)

== In other cultures ==
Some theories hypothesize that Baba Yaga is a Slavic folklore version of Tiresias.

== In the arts ==
- The figure of Tiresias has been much invoked by fiction writers and poets. At the climax of Lucian of Samosata's Necyomantia, Tiresias in Hades is asked "what is the best way of life?" to which he responds, "the life of the ordinary guy: forget philosophers and their metaphysics."
- Tiresias appears in Dante's Inferno, in Canto XX, among the soothsayers in the Fourth Bolgia of the Eighth Circle, where augurs are punished by having their heads turned backwards; since they claimed to see the future in life, in the afterlife they are denied any forward vision.
- The Breasts of Tiresias (French: Les mamelles de Tirésias) is a surrealist play by Guillaume Apollinaire written in 1903. The play received its first production in a revised version in 1917. In his preface to the play, the poet invented the word "surrealism" to describe his new style of drama. The French composer Francis Poulenc wrote an opera with the same name based on Apollinaire's 1917 play. It was first performed at the Opéra-Comique in 1947.
- "Tiresias" the poem by Alfred, Lord Tennyson, narrated by the persona Tiresias himself, incorporates the notion that his prophecies, though always true, are generally not believed.
- Tiresias is featured in T. S. Eliot's poem The Waste Land (Section III, The Fire Sermon) and in a note Eliot states that Tiresias is "the most important personage in the poem, uniting all the rest."
- Tiresias appears in Three Cantos III (1917) and cantos I and 47 in the long poem The Cantos by Ezra Pound.
- Virginia Woolf's Orlando is a modernist novel that uses major events in Tiresias's life.
- Tiresias is a ballet choreographed by Frederick Ashton to music by Constant Lambert first performed at the Royal Opera House Covent Garden, London, on 9 July 1951.
- Christopher Lee portrayed Tiresias in the 1997 miniseries The Odyssey.
- Tiresia, a 2003 French film directed by Bertrand Bonello uses the legend of Tiresias to tell the story of a modern transgender person.
- Tiresias is portrayed by James Remar in Christopher Nolan's The Odyssey (2026).

== Sources ==
- Graves, Robert (1960). The Greek Myths (revised ed.).
- Brisson, Luc (1976). Le mythe de Tirésias: essai d'analyse structurale—Structural analysis by a follower of Claude Lévi-Strauss and a repertory of literary references and works of art in an iconographical supplement. (Leiden: Brill).
