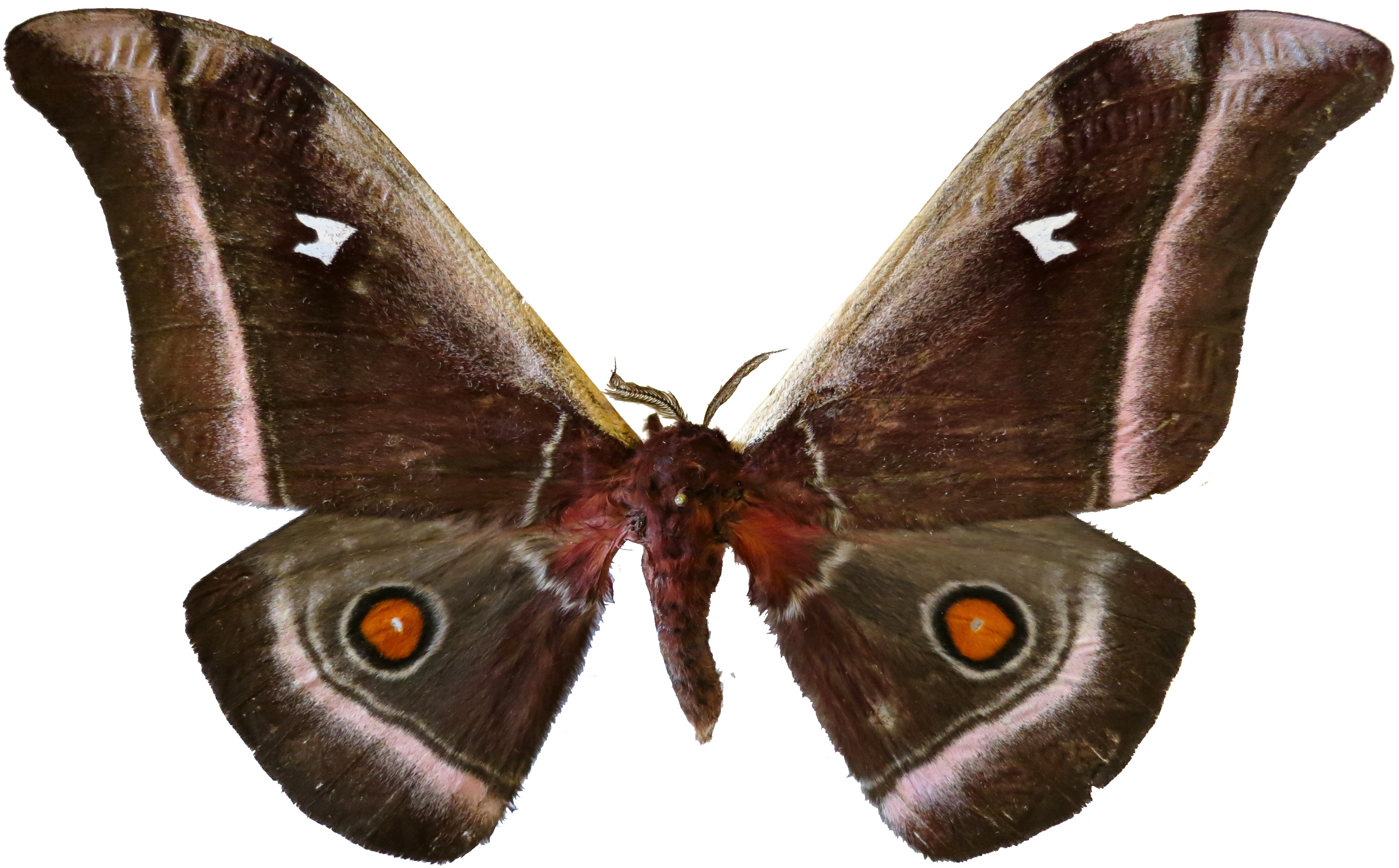
- From Cameroon

Scientific classification
- Kingdom: Animalia
- Phylum: Arthropoda
- Class: Insecta
- Order: Lepidoptera
- Family: Saturniidae
- Genus: Bunaea
- Species: B. alcinoe

Binomial name
- Bunaea alcinoe (Stoll, 1780)

= Bunaea alcinoe =

Cabbage tree emperor moth

Species of moth

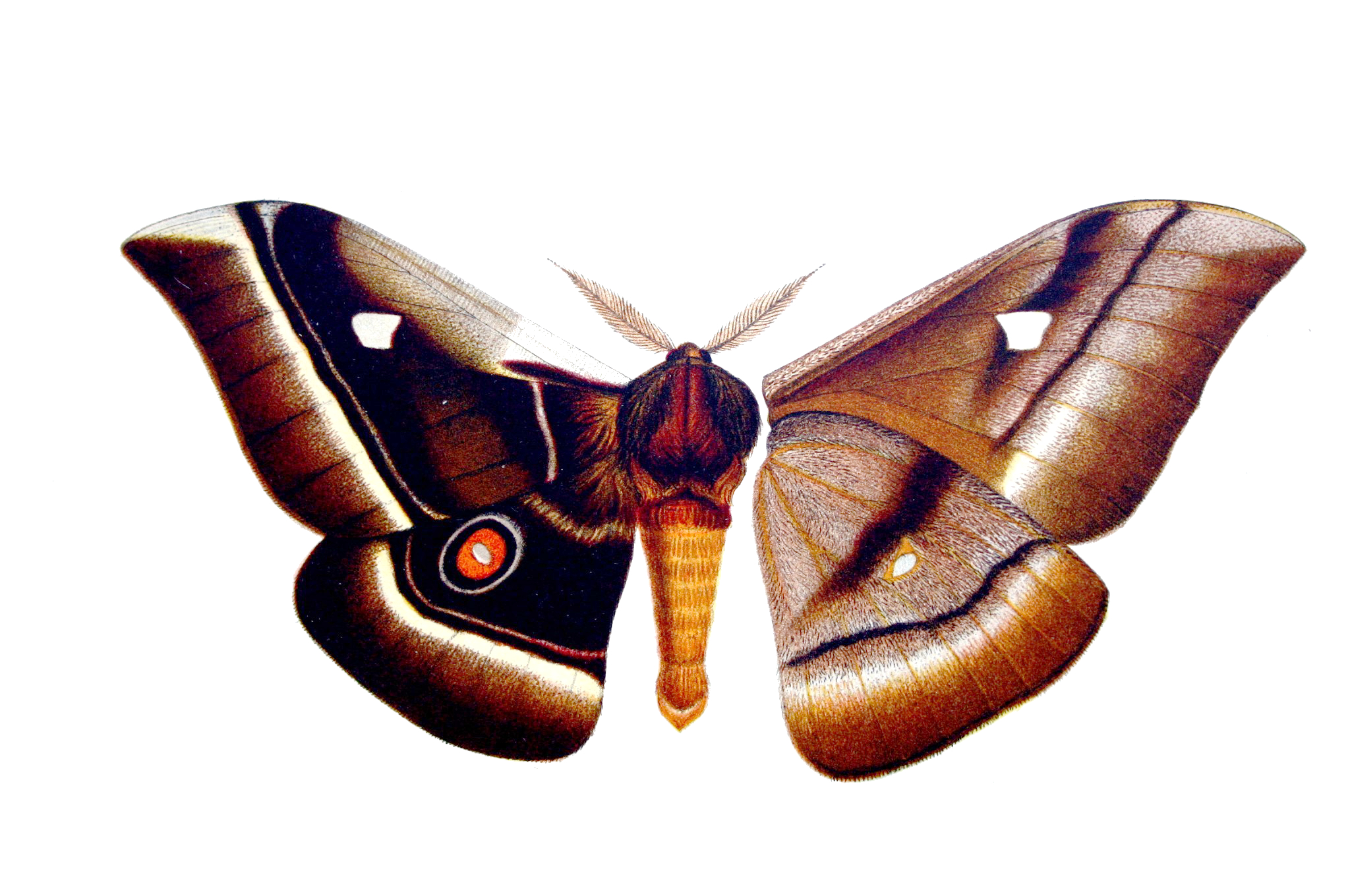
From William Lucas Distant's 1924 Insecta Transvaaliensia

Bunaea alcinoe, /bjuːˈniːə ælˈsɪnoʊiː/ the cabbage tree emperor moth, is an African moth species belonging to the family Saturniidae. It was first described by Caspar Stoll in 1780.

== Larva ==
The final instar is about 70 mm (2.8 in) in length and about 15 mm (0.59 in) in diameter. "Ground colour deep velvety black; each somite, from 4th to 12th, bearing eight white/yellow tubercular processes, two subdorsally, two laterally, and four (in two rows) on each side subspiracularly. The 2nd somite bears four black processes, two subdorsally and two laterally. The 3rd somite bears 4 black processes, as in the 2nd, and two small yellow processes on each side, in line with the subspiracular processes on the other somites. Spiracles red; those on the 4th to 11th somites being surrounded by an irregularly shaped red area. Head and legs concolorous with body". (Fawcett).

== Food plants ==
Species of the genera Bauhinia, Croton, Cussonia and Celtis and the species Harpephyllum afrum and Ekebergia capensis. In the Democratic Republic of the Congo the larvae feed on Sarcocephalus latifolius, Crossopteryx febrifuga and Dacryodes edulis.

== Wings ==
The wings are covered by overlapping scales that are less than 0.25 mm (0.0098 in) long and have a peculiar porous structure. This structure absorbs the echolocation sound of their predators, the bats, and thus helps them to camouflage themselves acoustically.

== Name ==
In Greek mythology Alcinoe was the daughter of Polybus of Corinth. Alcinoe was also the name of a naiad, daughter of Oceanus and Tethys.

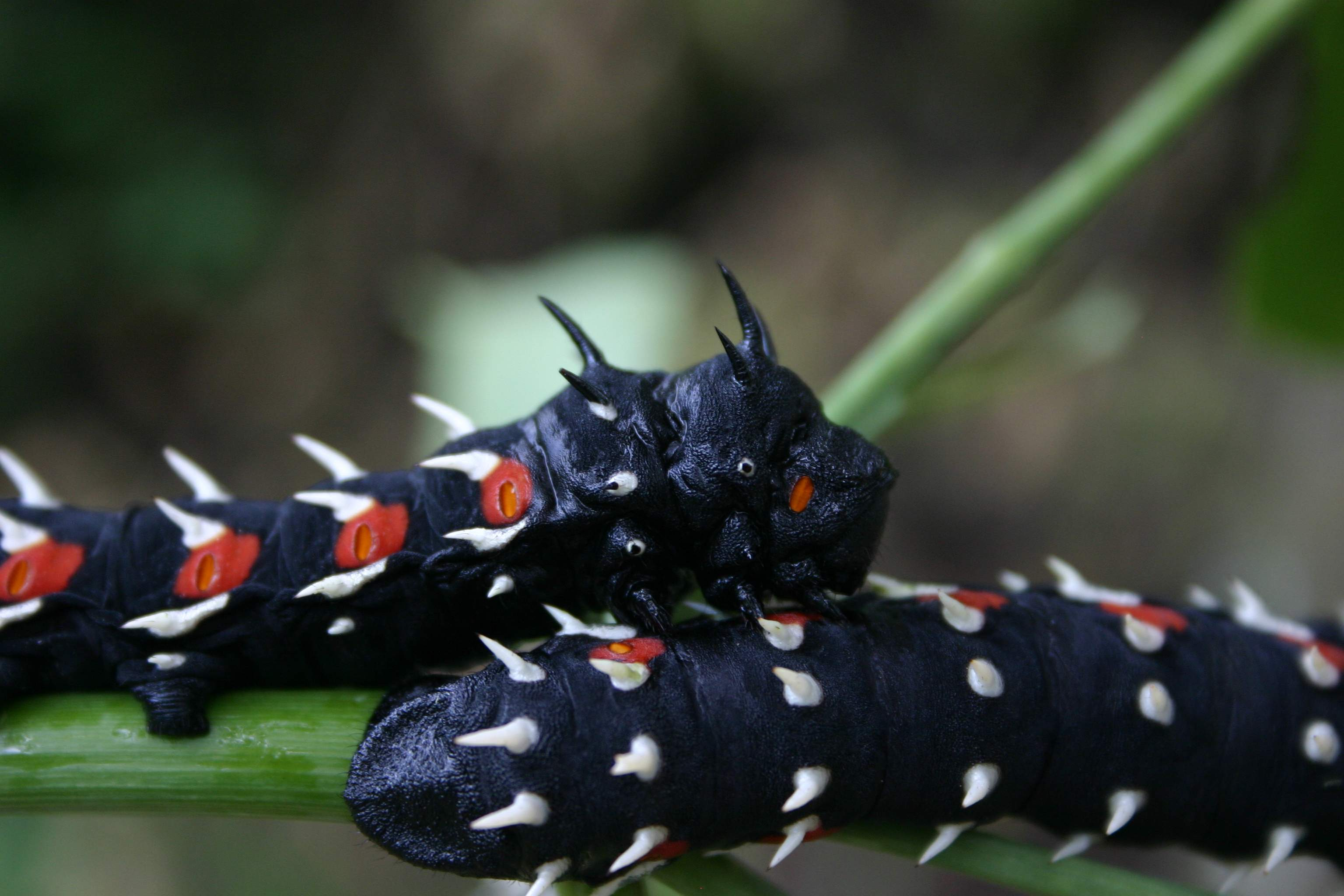
Larvae of Bunaea alcinoe

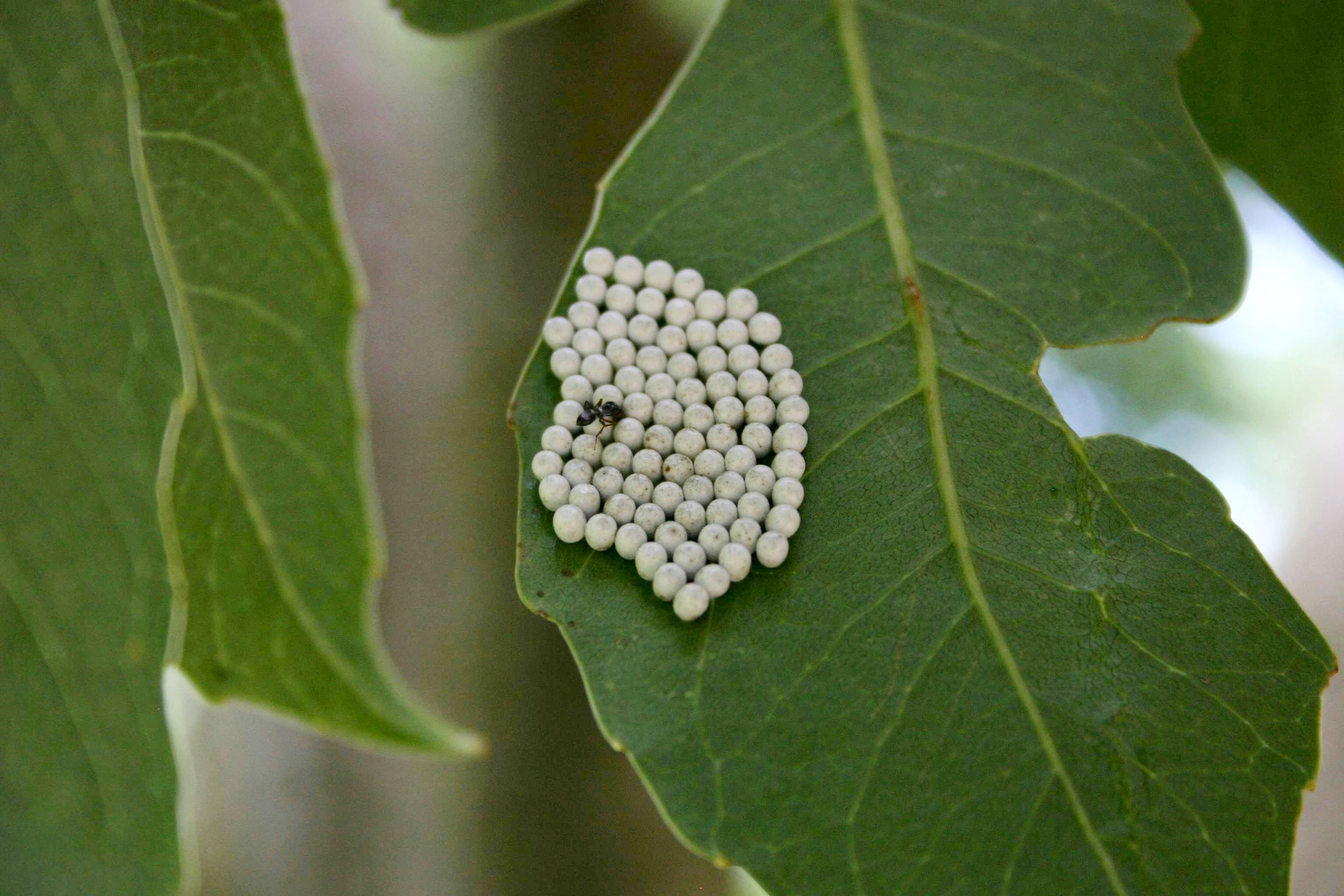
Eggs of Bunaea alcinoe with wasp
