= Alcinoe =

Set of mythological Greek characters

Alcinoe (/ælˈsɪnoʊ.iː/; Ancient Greek: Ἀλκινόη, romanized: Alkinóē, lit. 'strong-minded') is the name that is attributed to three women in Greek mythology:

- Alcinoe, a naiad, and one of the nymphs of Mount Lykaion in Arcadia. Her parents possibly were Oceanus and Tethys. She had her fellow nymphs assist Rhea whilst she was in labour with Zeus and helped nurse the infant god.
- Alcinoë, daughter of King Polybus of Corinth and possibly his queen Periboea. She became the wife of Amphilochus, son of Dryas. Alcinoë was cursed by Athena to fall in love with Xanthus of Samos for refusing to pay the spinner Nicandra her due wages.
- Alcinoe, a daughter of Sthenelus, and a granddaughter of Perseus.
