= Moero =

Hellenistic poet from Byzantium

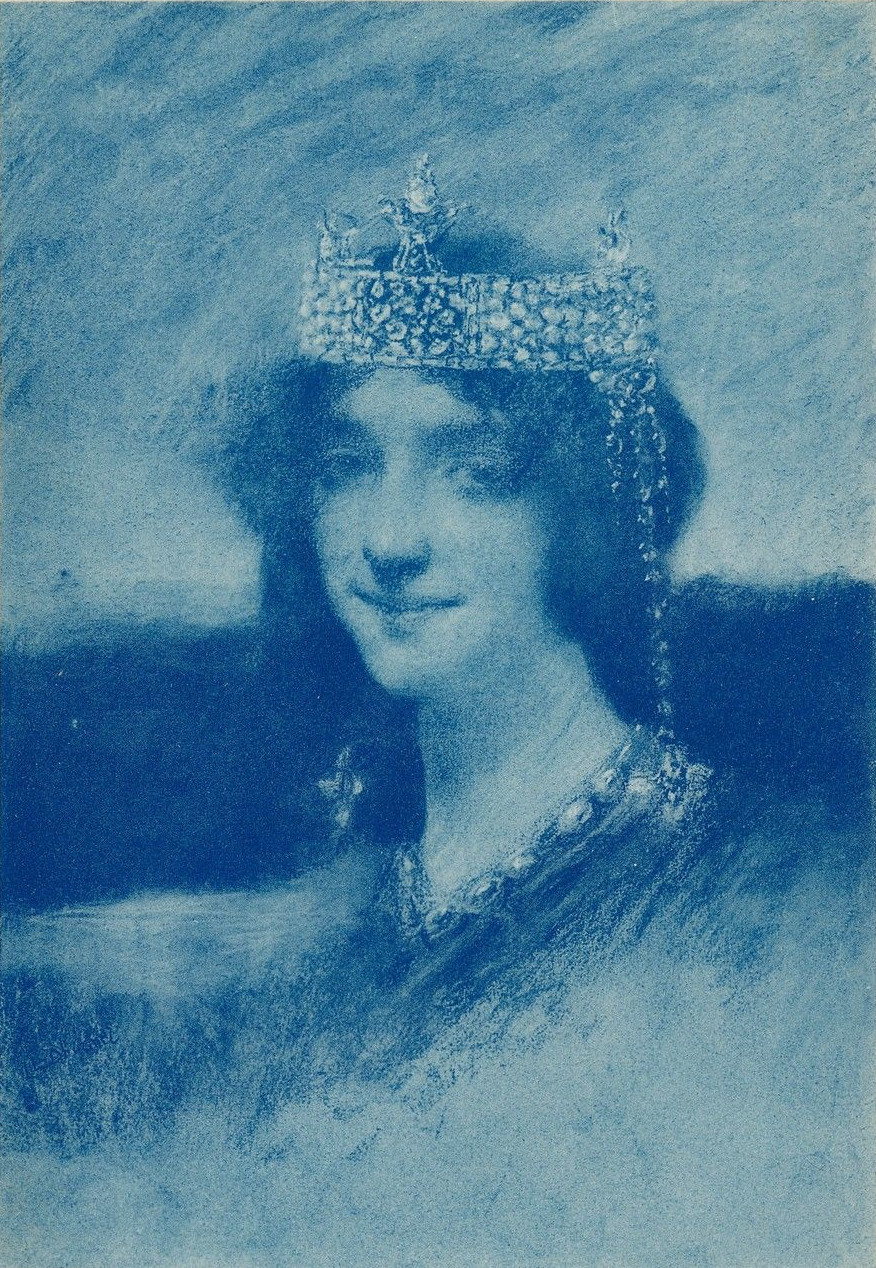
Lucien Lévy-Dhurmer's portrait of Moero for Les Kitharèdes by Renée Vivien.

Moero (Ancient Greek: Μοιρώ, fl. c. 300 BC) or Myro (Ancient Greek: Μυρώ) was a woman poet of the Hellenistic period from the city of Byzantium (modern Istanbul). Little of her poetry survives: ten lines of her epic poem Mnemosyne are quoted by Athenaeus, and two of her epigrams are preserved in the Greek Anthology; two other poems are known only through mentions in other sources.

== Life ==
Moero was the wife of Andromachus Philologus and the mother – the Suda says daughter, but this is less likely – of the tragedian Homerus of Byzantium. She was probably active during the late fourth and early third centuries BC.

== Work ==
Little of Moero's poetry has survived. Ten lines from her epic poem Mnemosyne are quoted by Athenaeus, and though Meleager mentions "many" epigrams by Moero in the introductory poem to his Garland, only two four-line poems remain in the Greek Anthology. She also wrote a poem called Arai ("Curses"). This is known only through a scholion on Parthenius of Nicaea's Erotica Pathemata, which notes that the myth of Alcinoë is told in it. Eustathius mentions that she wrote a hymn to Poseidon, and Pausanias reports that one of her poems told a story about Amphion, a mythical king of Thebes.

The surviving fragment of Moero's Mnemosyne tells the story of Zeus' childhood on Crete, where he had been hidden by his mother Rhea to save him from being killed by his father Cronus. Like the surviving fragment of Corinna's poem on the contest between Cithaeron and Helicon (PMG 654 col. i), it retells an episode of Zeus' early life to emphasise the role of women. In the surviving lines, Moero alludes to a scene in book twelve of the Odyssey, in which Circe describes to Odysseus the dangers of the Wandering Rocks on one of his possible routes home to Ithaca. In describing their dangers, Circe says that nothing can pass the rocks safely, even the doves which bring ambrosia to Zeus. Hellenistic commentators, who found it inappropriate for ordinary birds to bring Zeus ambrosia, were concerned with the interpretation of this passage; Moero solved the problem by reinterpreting the doves (peleiai) as the Pleiades star-cluster. Alongside the Odyssey, Moero also alludes to passages of Hesiod's Theogony and Works and Days; this intertextual allusion is typical of Hellenistic poetry.

Moero's surviving epigrams are stylistically similar to the works of Anyte. Both are transmitted in the section of the Greek Anthology which focuses on dedicatory epigrams. One is addressed to a bunch of grapes; the other asks some dryads to protect a man who has carved a statuette for them. The latter is imitated by Hermocreon (AP 9.327). Judging by her surviving poetry, Moero's work explored motherhood, women's responsibilities to their families, and female sexual desire.

== Reception ==
Moero seems to have had a high reputation as a poet in antiquity. Antipater of Thessalonica includes her in his list of famous women poets, and Meleager's proem to his Garland refers to her as a "lily", putting her alongside Sappho and Anyte. According to an epigram by Christodorus, she was taught poetry by the Muses. Tatian reports that Cephisodotus, the son of Praxiteles, sculpted her. Two epigrams which refer to Moero, composed by Anyte and Marcus Argentarius, survive in the Greek Anthology, and may be a reworking of a now-lost poem by Moero.

In the twentieth century, Moero was referenced by the imagist poet H. D. in her poem "Nossis" and novel Palimpsest, and was included in Judy Chicago's Heritage Floor. As so little information about Moero and her poems has survived, modern scholarship primarily discusses her alongside better-known Hellenistic women poets.

== Works cited ==
- Bowman, Laurel (2019). "Hidden Figures: The Women Who Wrote Epigram". In Henriksén, Christer (ed.). A Companion to Ancient Epigram. Blackwell.
- "Moero of Byzantium". Brooklyn Museum. Archived from the original on 30 May 2023.
- Gow, A. S. F.; Page, D. L., eds. (1965). The Greek Anthology: Hellenistic Epigrams. Vol. II. Cambridge University Press.
- Gregory, Eileen (1997). H. D. and Hellenism: Classic Lines. Cambridge University Press.
- Gutzwiller, Kathryn (2007). A Guide to Hellenistic Literature. Blackwell. ISBN 9780470690185.
- Gutzwiller, Kathryn (2016). "Moero". In Sider, David (ed.). Hellenistic Poetry: A Selection. University of Michigan Press.
- Martin, Amy (2022). Poetess on the Periphery? Revisiting the Question of a Female Poetic Tradition in Hellenistic Poetry (PhD thesis). Stellenbosch University.
- Natoli, Bartolo A.; Pitts, Angela; Hallett, Judith P. (2022). Ancient Women Writers of Greece and Rome. Routledge.
- Plant, I. M. (2004). Women Writers of Ancient Greece and Rome: An Anthology. University of Oklahoma Press.
- Skinner, Marylin B. (2005). "Homer's Mother". In Greene, Ellen (ed.). Women Poets in Ancient Greece and Rome. University of Oklahoma Press.
