= Homerus of Byzantium =

Ancient Greek grammarian and tragic poet

Homer of Byzantium (Greek: Ὅμηρος ὁ Βυζάντιος) was an ancient Greek grammarian and tragic poet. He was also called ho Neoteros ("the Younger") to distinguish him from the older Homer.

The son of the grammarian Andromachus Philologus and the poet Moero (some sources give her as Homer's daughter), he flourished in the beginning of the 3rd century BC, in the court of Ptolemy II Philadelphus at Alexandria. Together with his main rival, Sositheus, he is counted among the seven great tragics of the Alexandrian canon, or "Pleiad" (named after the cluster of seven stars). Homer is variously attributed 45, 47 or 57 plays, all of them now lost. Only the title of one, Eurypyleia, survives.

== Sources ==
- William Smith, Dictionary of Greek and Roman Biography and Mythology
