= Prolegomena de comoedia =

Ancient texts relating to stage comedy

Prolegomena de comoedia (English: Introduction to Comedy) is a modern collective name for several short ancient Greek and Byzantine writings in Greek that are mostly found in the manuscripts of Aristophanes' comedies or taken as excerpts from other texts. These writings are important for deepening the knowledge about the development of Greek comedy. In Dindorf's edition, the texts are given in the usual order:

1. Platonius, On the feature of comedy (Ancient Greek: Περὶ διαφορᾶς κωμῳδιῶν).
2. Platonius, On the feature of styles (Περὶ διαφορᾶς χαρακτήρων)
3. Anonymous, On comedy (Περὶ κωμῳδίας). This short essay is often cited because it gives a historical view of the origins of Greek comedy, thus supplementing the scanty information given by Aristotle in his Poetics, as well as a concise overview of the historical development of comedy from Epicharmus and Magnetes to Diphilus. This is the most frequently quoted work from the Prolegomena de comoedia and, unless otherwise stated, this is the essay referred to when the work On Comedy (Latin: De comoedia) is cited in the literature.
4. Anonymous, On comedy (Περὶ κωμῳδίας) ― the author of this essay is different from the previous one.
5. Anonymous, On comedy (Περὶ κωμῳδίας) ― the author of this essay is different from the previous ones.
6. Anonymous, On comedy (Περὶ κωμῳδίας) ― the author of this essay, which consists of only a few sentences, is different from the previous ones.
7. A short essay of a few sentences, by an unknown author, about the chorus in comic plays.
8. List of names of seven poets of the Old Attic Comedy and the number of plays each of them wrote.
9. Anonymous, On comedy (Περὶ κωμῳδίας) ― from a scholium in Dyonisius Thrax's Grammar.
10. Andronicus, On the order of poets (Περὶ τάξεως ποιητῶν).
11. Anonymous, Life of Aristophanes (Ἀριστοφάνου βίος) ― an ancient biography of Aristophanes.
12. A biography of Aristophanes by another author.
13. A biography of Aristophanes by yet another author.
14. Entry on Aristophanes in Suda.
15. Thomas Magister, a short biography of Aristophanes.
16. Antipater of Thessalonica, verses about Aristophanes and Diodorus' epitaph on the grave of Aristophanes (from the Palatine Anthology).
17. Demetrius Triclinius, an essay on metres.

A work by Dionysiades entitled Styles or Lovers of Comedy (Χαρακτῆρες ἢ Φιλοκωμῳδοί), "in which he describes (ἀπαγγέλλει) the styles of [comic] poets", may have served as a foundation and starting point for at least some of these writings. This work seems to be the first attempt to make a distinction between different literary styles of Attic comedians.
