= Alexander Aetolus =

3rd-century BC Greek poet and grammarian

Alexander Aetolus (Ancient Greek: Ἀλέξανδρος ὁ Αἰτωλός, Alexandros ho Aitōlos) or Alexander the Aetolian was a Hellenistic Greek poet and grammarian, who worked at the Library of Alexandria and composed poetry in a variety of genres, now almost entirely lost. He is the only known Aetolian poet of antiquity.

== Life and works ==
Alexander was a native of Pleuron in Aetolia. A contemporary of Callimachus and Theocritus, he was born c. 315 BC, and according to the Suda the names of his parent were Satyros and Stratokleia. By the 280s he was one of a group of literary scholars working at the Library of Alexandria, where Ptolemy II Philadelphus commissioned him to organize and correct the texts of the tragedies and satyr plays in the collection of the Library. Later, along with Antagoras and Aratus, he spent time at the court of the Macedonian king Antigonus II Gonatas.

In addition to his work as a scholar, Alexander was a versatile poet who produced verse in a variety of meters and genres, although only about 70 lines of his work survive, mostly in short fragments quoted by later sources. He was admired for his tragedies, which earned him a place among the seven Alexandrian tragedians who constituted the so-called Tragic Pleiad. One of his tragedies (or perhaps a satyr play), the Astragalistai ("Knucklebone-players"), described the killing of a fellow student by the young Patroklos. Alexander also wrote epics or epyllia, of which a few names and short fragments survive: the Halieus ("Fisherman"), about the sea-god Glaukos, and the Krika or Kirka (perhaps "Circe"?) The longest surviving example of his work is a 34-line excerpt from the Apollo, a poem in elegiac couplets, which tells the story of Antheus and Cleoboea. A few other elegiac fragments are quoted by other authors, and two epigrams in the Greek Anthology are usually considered his work. Ancient sources also describe him as a writer of kinaidoi (obscene verses, known euphemistically as "Ionic poems") in the manner of Sotades. A short fragment in anapestic tetrameters compares the gruff and sullen personality of Euripides with the honeyed quality of his poetry.

== Editions ==
- A. Meineke, Analecta alexandrina (Berlin 1843), pp. 215–251.
- J. U. Powell, Collectanea alexandrina: Reliquiae minores poetarum graecorum aetatis ptolemaicae, 323–146 A.C. (Oxford 1925), pp. 121–129.
- E. Magnelli, Alexandri Aetoli testimonia et fragmenta (Florence 1999).
- J. L. Lightfoot, Hellenistic Collection (Loeb Classical Library: Cambridge, Mass. 2009), pp. 99–145 (with English translation).

== Sources ==
- Dover, K. 1996. "Alexander of Pleuron", Oxford Classical Dictionary, 3rd ed., Oxford, p. 60.
- Gow, A. S. F., and D. L. Page. 1965. The Greek Anthology: Hellenistic Epigrams, Cambridge, vol. 2, pp. 27–29.
- Knaack, G. 1894. "Alexandros 84", Realencyclopädie der classischen Altertumswissenschaft I.2, 1894, cols. 1447–1448.
- Lightfoot, J. L., ed. 2009. Hellenistic Collection, Loeb Classical Library, Cambridge, Mass., pp. 99–145.
- Lloyd-Jones, H. 1994. "Alexander Aetolus, Aristophanes, and the Life of Euripides", Storia poesia e pensiero nel mondo antico: Studi in onore di M. Gigante, Naples, pp. 371–379.
- Olson, S. 2000. review of Enrico Magnelli, Alexandri Aetoli testimonia et fragmenta, Bryn Mawr Classical Review 2000.11.14.
- Spanoudakis, K. 2005. "Alexander Aetolus' Astragalistai", Eikasmos 16, pp. 149–154.
