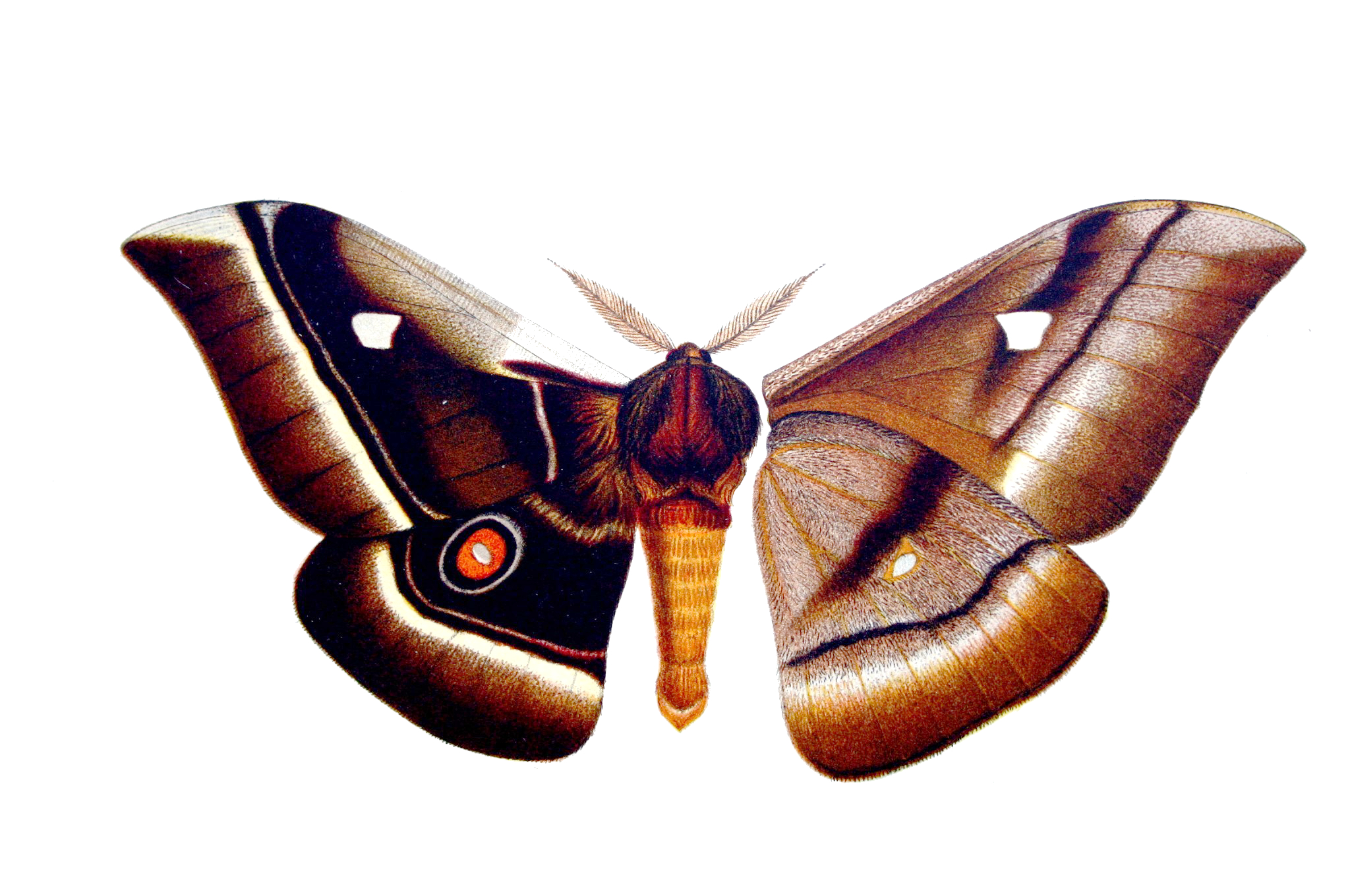
- Bunaea alcinoe

Scientific classification
- Kingdom: Animalia
- Phylum: Arthropoda
- Class: Insecta
- Order: Lepidoptera
- Family: Saturniidae
- Subfamily: Saturniinae
- Genus: Bunaea; Hübner, 1819

= Bunaea =

Genus of moths

Bunaea is a genus of moths in the family Saturniidae first described by Jacob Hübner in 1819. They don't spin a cocoon.

== Species ==
- Bunaea alcinoe (Stoll, 1780)
- Bunaea aslauga Kirby, 1877
- Bunaea vulpes Oberthuer, 1916
