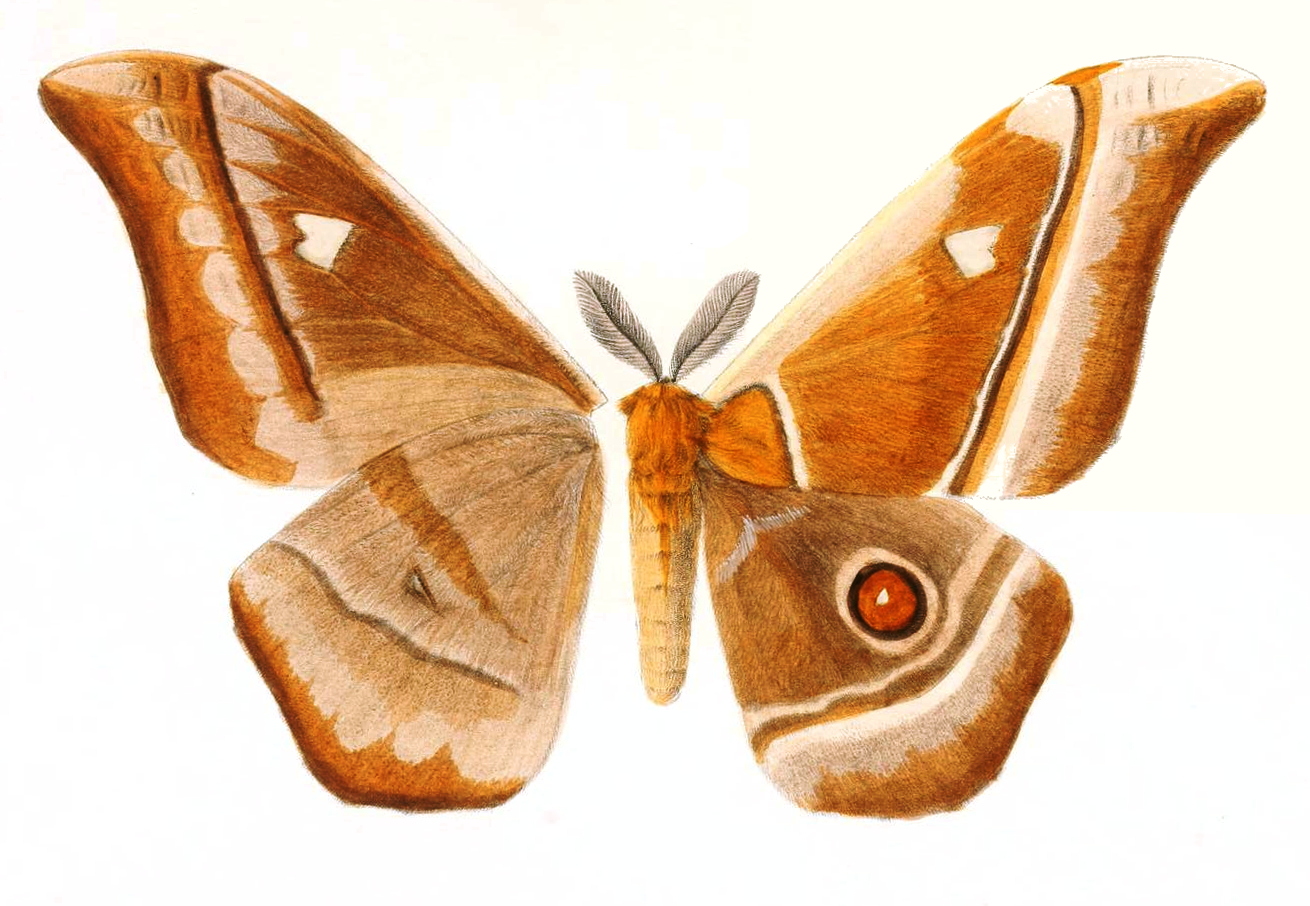
- male

Scientific classification
- Domain: Eukaryota
- Kingdom: Animalia
- Phylum: Arthropoda
- Class: Insecta
- Order: Lepidoptera
- Family: Saturniidae
- Genus: Bunaea
- Species: B. vulpes

Binomial name
- Bunaea vulpes Oberthuer, 1916

= Bunaea vulpes =

Species of moth

Bunaea vulpes is a species of large emperor moth found in Madagascar.
