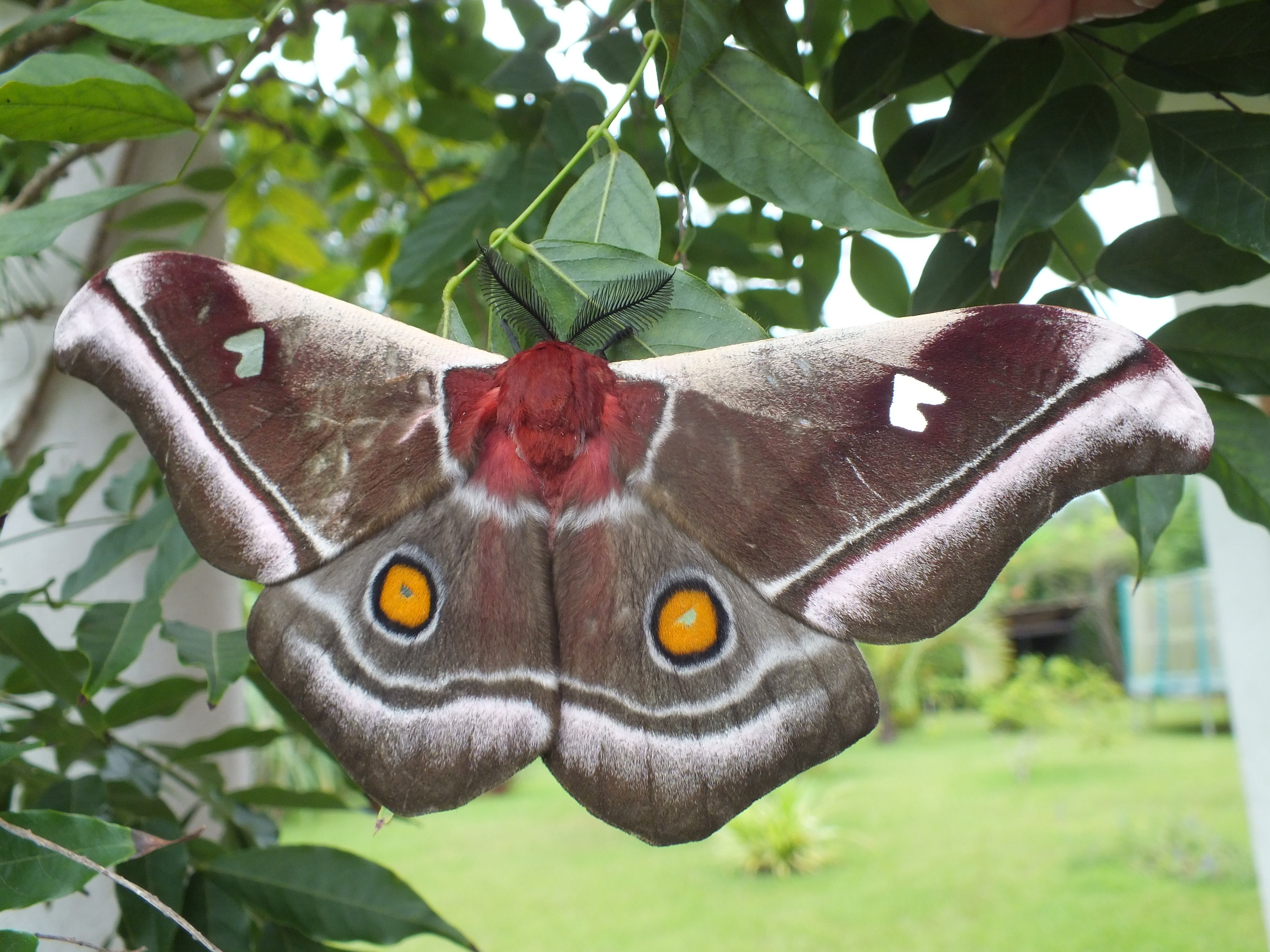

Scientific classification
- Kingdom: Animalia
- Phylum: Arthropoda
- Class: Insecta
- Order: Lepidoptera
- Family: Saturniidae
- Genus: Bunaea
- Species: B. aslauga

Binomial name
- Bunaea aslauga Kirby, 1877

Synonyms
- Bunaea cambouei Oberthür, 1916; Bunaea densilineata Oberthür, 1916; Bunaea diospyri Mabille, 1879; Bunaea oberthuri Bouvier, 1926; Bunaea plumicornis Butler, 1882; Bunaea urania Oberthür, 1916

= Bunaea aslauga =

Species of moth

Bunaea aslauga, the Madagascar emperor moth, is an African moth belonging to the family Saturniidae. The species was first described by William Forsell Kirby in 1877. It has been found in Kenya and in Madagascar

It has a wingspan of 100–150 mm.

== Food plants ==
One of its food plants is Intsia bijuga, a species in the family Fabaceae.

Other host plants that can be tried are Ligustrum, Hedera and other Fabaceae.
