= Silanion =

Ancient Greek sculptor

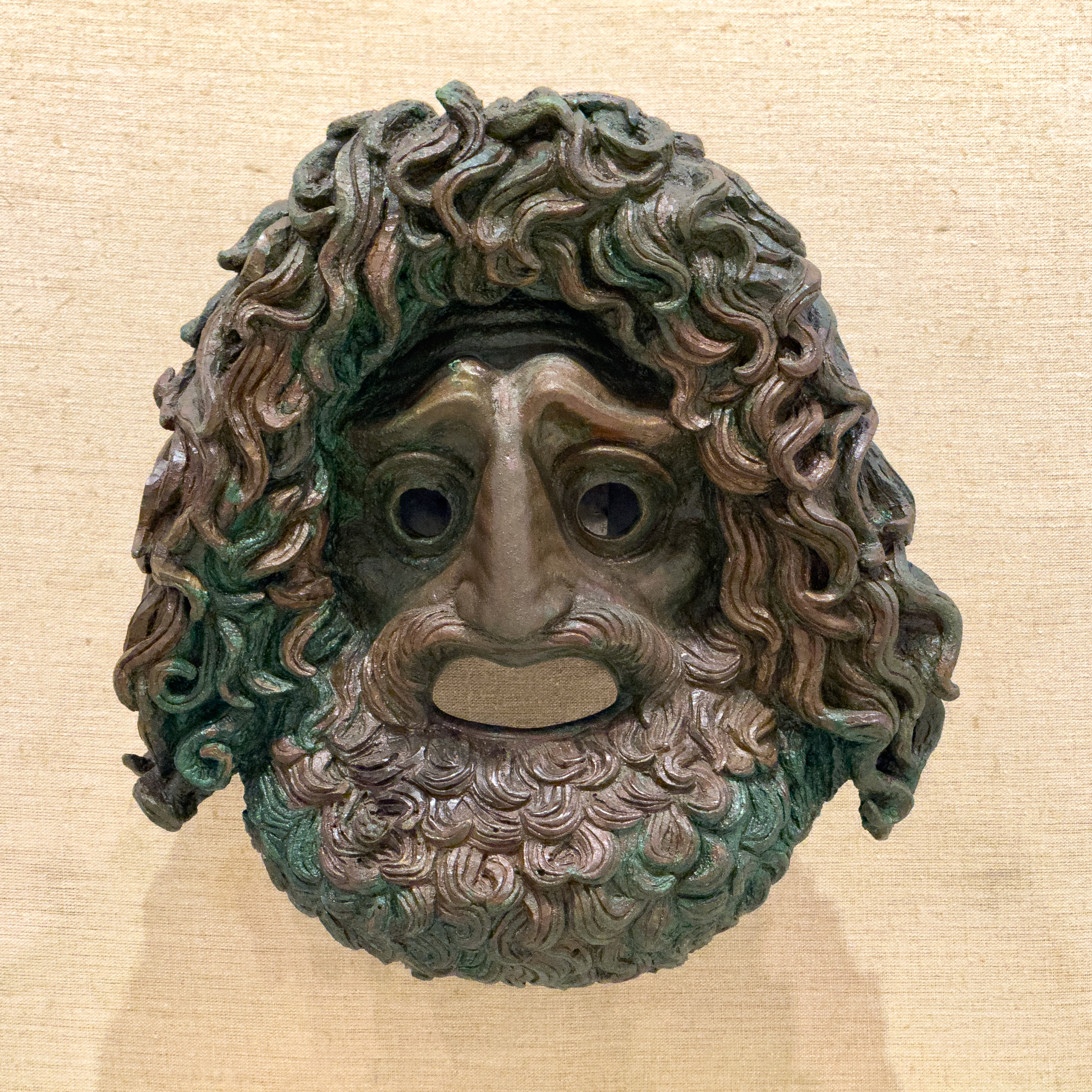
Tragic mask in bronze, attributed to Silanion. Museum of Piraeus, Athens, Greece.

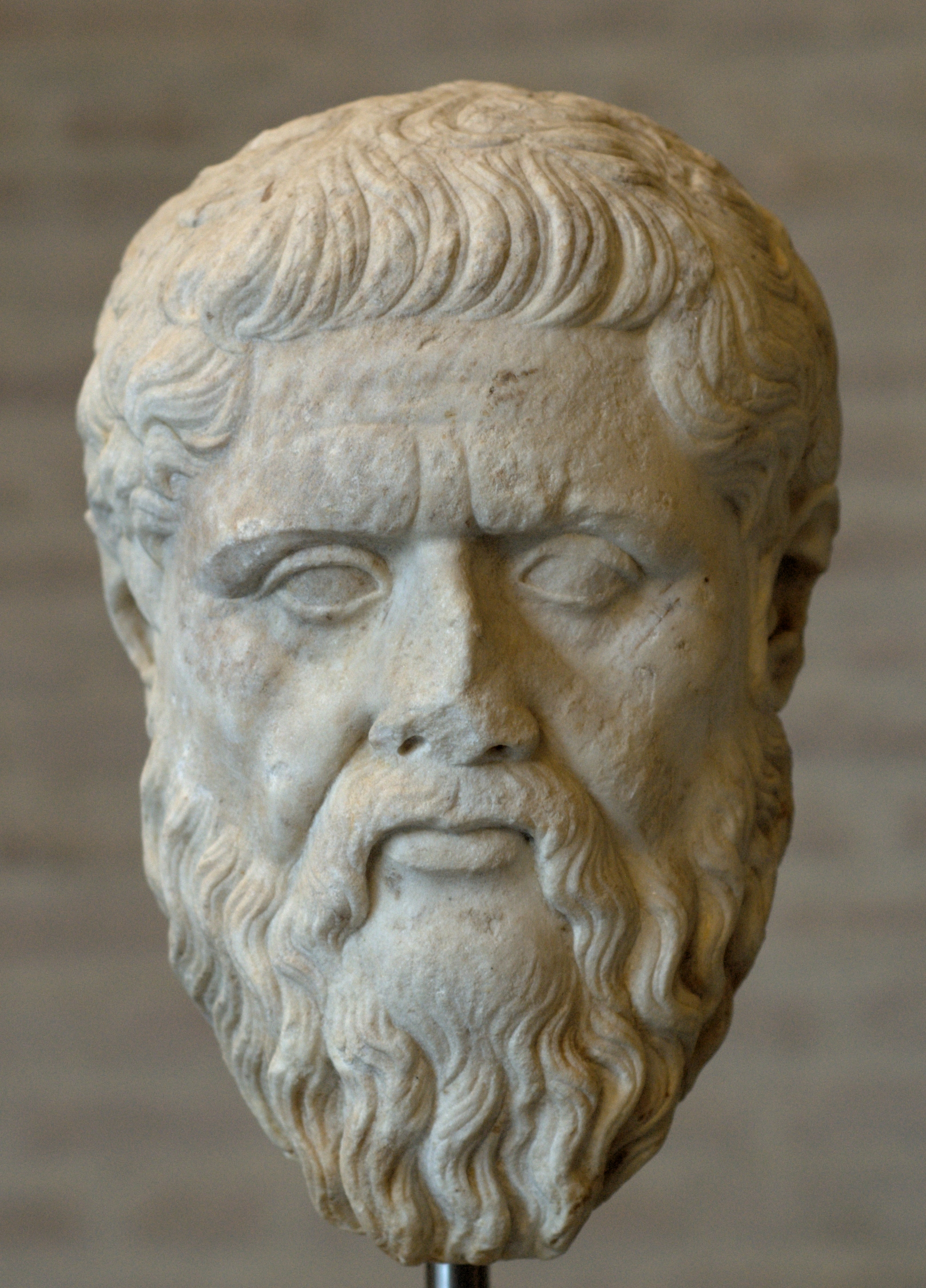
Plato, Roman copy of Silanion's work (Glyptothek, Munich)

Silanion (Ancient Greek: Σιλανίων, gen. Σιλανίωνος) was the best-known of the Greek portrait-sculptors working during the fourth century BC. Pliny gives his floruit as the 113th Olympiad, that is, around 328–325 BCE (Natural History, 34.51), and records he had no famous teacher. His idealized portrait head of Plato was commissioned by Mithridates of Persia for the Academy of Athens, c. 370 BC. Later copies of it and of an idealized portrait head of Sappho survive. Both are of simple ideal type, the Sappho not strictly a portrait, since Sappho (sixth century BC) lived before the age of portraiture. The best copy of Plato is in the Glyptothek of Munich (illustration).

Silanion also produced a "portrait" of the poet Corinna. Other "portrait" heads by Silanion evoked mythic and legendary heroes. An Achilles mentioned by Pliny was later adapted to represent Ares, and an equally idealized Theseus is mentioned by Plutarch.

Silanion wrote a treatise on proportions that is mentioned by Vitruvius (vii, introduction), but has otherwise been lost to the ages.
