= Byzantium =

Ancient Greek city, forerunner of Constantinople

Byzantium 667 BC – 330 AD
- Βυζάντιον (Ancient Greek)
- Byzantion (earlier Greek name), Nova Roma ("New Rome")
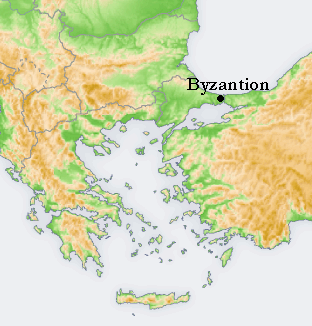
- Location of Byzantion, corresponding to the modern-day Fatih district of Istanbul
- Interactive map of Byzantium; 667 BC – 330 AD
- 41°00′55″N 28°59′05″E
- Type: Ancient city
- Cultures: Ancient Greek, Roman
- Location: Fatih, Istanbul, Turkey
- Region: Marmara Region
- Part of: Roman Empire; Byzantine Empire; Latin Empire

History
- Built: 667 BC

Site notes
- Area: 6 km^{2} (2.3 sq mi) enclosed within Constantinian Walls 14 km^{2} (5.4 sq mi) enclosed within Theodosian Walls
- Replaced by Constantinople in the 330s.

Byzantium (/bɪˈzæntiəm, -ʃəm/) or Byzantion (Ancient Greek: Βυζάντιον) was an ancient Greek city in classical antiquity that became known as Constantinople in late antiquity and Istanbul in modern times. The Greek name Byzantion and its Latinization Byzantium continued to be used as a name of Constantinople sporadically and to varying degrees during the thousand-year existence of the Eastern Roman Empire, which also became known by the former name of the city as the Byzantine Empire. Byzantium was colonised by Greeks from Megara in the 7th century BC and remained primarily Greek-speaking until its conquest by the Ottoman Empire in 1453.

== Etymology ==
The etymology of Byzantium is unknown. It has been suggested that the name is of Thracian origin. It may be derived from the Thracian personal name Byzas which means "he-goat". Ancient Greek legend refers to the Greek king Byzas, the leader of the Megarian colonists and founder (Oikistes) of the city. The name Lygos for the city, which likely corresponds to an earlier Thracian settlement, is mentioned by Pliny the Elder in his Natural History.

Byzántios, plural Byzántioi (Ancient Greek: Βυζάντιος, Βυζάντιοι, Latin: Byzantius; adjective the same) referred to Byzantion's inhabitants, also used as an ethnonym for the people of the city and as a family name. In the Middle Ages, Byzántion was also a synecdoche for the eastern Roman Empire. (An ellipsis of Medieval Greek: Βυζάντιον κράτος, romanized: Byzántion krátos). Byzantinós (Medieval Greek: Βυζαντινός, Latin: Byzantinus) denoted an inhabitant of the empire. The Anglicization of Latin Byzantinus yielded "Byzantine", with 15th and 16th century forms including Byzantin, Bizantin(e), Bezantin(e), and Bysantin as well as Byzantian and Bizantian.

The name Byzantius and Byzantinus were applied from the 9th century to gold Byzantine coinage, reflected in the French besant (d'or), Italian bisante, and English besant, byzant, or bezant. The English usage, derived from Old French besan (pl. besanz), and relating to the coin, dates from the 12th century.

Later, the name Byzantium became common in the West to refer to the Eastern Roman Empire, whose capital was Constantinople. As a term for the east Roman state as a whole, Byzantium was introduced by the historian Hieronymus Wolf only in 1555, a century after the last remnants of the empire, whose inhabitants continued to refer to their polity as the Roman Empire (Medieval Greek: Βασιλεία τῶν Ῥωμαίων, romanized: Basileía tōn Rhōmaíōn, lit. 'empire of the Romans'), had ceased to exist.

Other places were historically known as Byzántion (Βυζάντιον) – a city in Libya mentioned by Stephanus of Byzantium and another on the western coast of India referred to by the Periplus of the Erythraean Sea; in both cases the names were probably adaptations of names in local languages. Faustus of Byzantium was from a city of that name in Cilicia.

== History ==
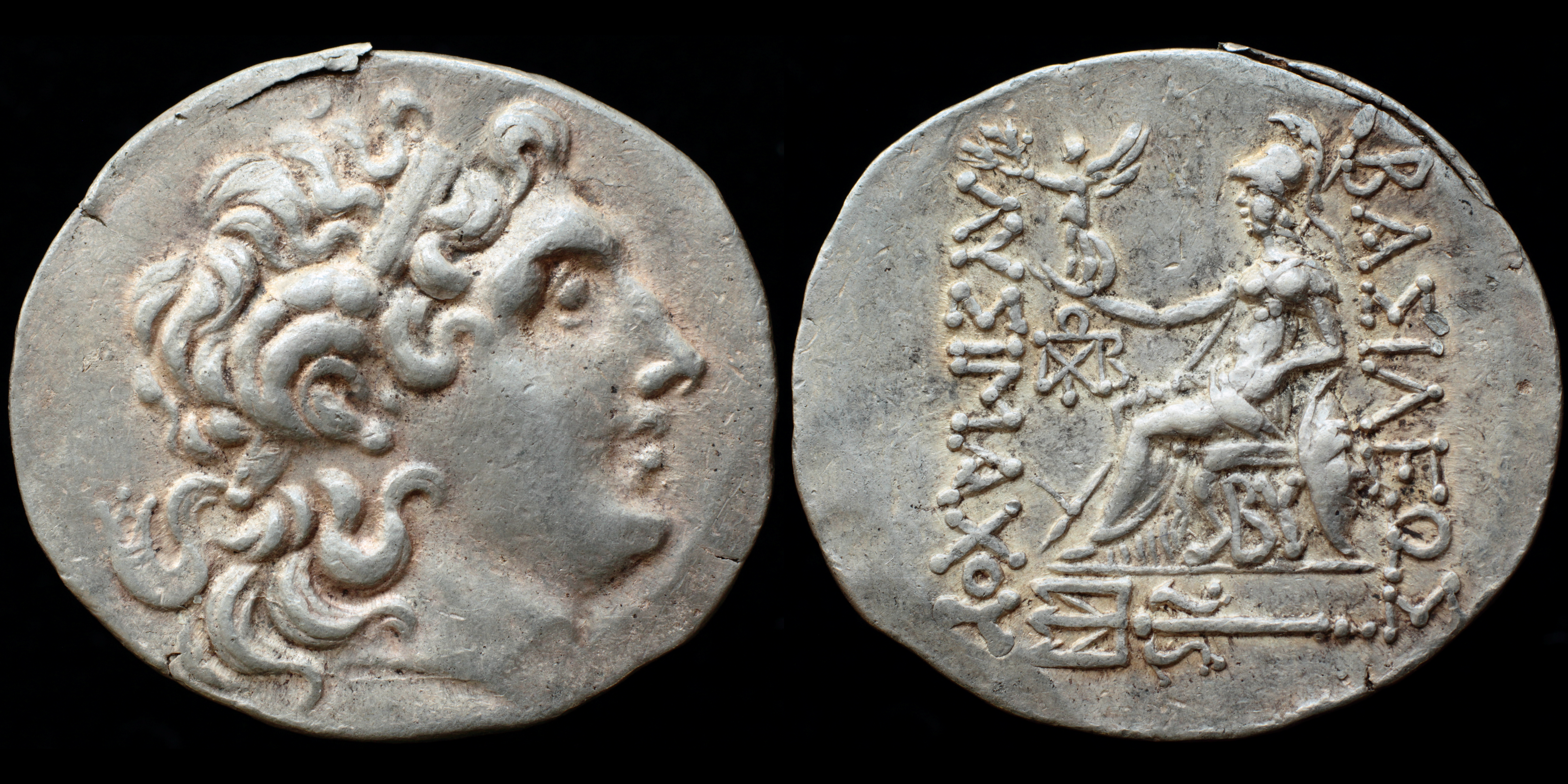

First side of the image: O: Head of Alexander the Great with Amun's horns
Second side of the image: R: Seated Athena holding Nike with wreath, ΒΑΣΙΛΕΩΣ / ΛΥΣΙΜΑΧΟΥ; monogram (ΠΩΛΥΒ) to left; ΒΥ below throne; trident in exergue
Silver tetradrachm struck in Byzantion c. 150–100 BC. Byzantion struck coins in the name of Lysimachus nearly 200 years after his death.

The origins of Byzantium are shrouded in legend. Tradition says that Byzas of Megara (a city-state near Athens) founded the city when he sailed northeast across the Aegean Sea. The date is usually given as 667 BC on the authority of Herodotus, who states the city was founded 17 years after Chalcedon. Eusebius, who wrote almost 800 years later, dates the founding of Chalcedon to 685/4 BC, but he also dates the founding of Byzantium to 656 BC (or a few years earlier depending on the edition). Herodotus' dating was later favoured by Constantine the Great, who celebrated Byzantium's 1,000th anniversary between the years 333 and 334.

Byzantium was mainly a trading city due to its location at the Black Sea's only entrance. Byzantium later conquered Chalcedon, across the Bosphorus on the Asiatic side.

The city was taken by the Persian Empire at the time of the Scythian campaign (513 BC) of Emperor Darius I (r. 522–486 BC), and was added to the administrative province of Skudra. Though Achaemenid control of the city was never as stable as compared to other cities in Thrace, it was considered, alongside Sestos, to be one of the foremost Achaemenid ports on the European coast of the Bosphorus and the Hellespont.

Byzantium was besieged by Greek forces during the Peloponnesian War. As part of Sparta's strategy for cutting off grain supplies to Athens during their siege of Athens, Sparta took control of the city in 411 BC, to bring the Athenians into submission. The Athenian military later retook the city in 408 BC, when the Spartans had withdrawn following their settlement.

After siding with Pescennius Niger against the victorious Septimius Severus, the city was besieged by Roman forces and suffered extensive damage in AD 196. Byzantium was rebuilt by Septimius Severus, now emperor, and quickly regained its previous prosperity. It was bound to Perinthus during the period of Septimius Severus. After the war, Byzantium lost its city status and free city privileges, but Caracalla persuaded Severus to restore these rights. In appreciation, the Byzantines named Caracalla an archon of their city. The strategic and highly defensible (due to being surrounded by water on almost all sides) location of Byzantium attracted Roman Emperor Constantine I who, in AD 330, refounded it as an imperial residence inspired by Rome itself, known as Nova Roma. Later, the city was called Constantinople (Greek: Κωνσταντινούπολις, Konstantinoupolis, "city of Constantine").

This combination of imperialism and location would affect Constantinople's role as the nexus between the continents of Europe and Asia. It was a commercial, cultural, and diplomatic centre and for centuries formed the capital of the Byzantine Empire, which decorated the city with numerous monuments, some still standing today. With its strategic position, Constantinople controlled the major trade routes between Asia and Europe, as well as the passage from the Mediterranean Sea to the Black Sea. On May 29, 1453, the city was conquered by the Ottoman Turks, and again became the capital of a powerful state, the Ottoman Empire. The Turks called the city "Istanbul" (although it was not officially renamed until 1930); the name derives from the Greek phrase "στην πόλη", which means "to the city". To this day it remains the largest and most populous city in Turkey, although Ankara is now the national capital.

== Emblem ==
By the late Hellenistic or early Roman period (1st century BC), the star and crescent motif was associated to some degree with Byzantium; even though it became more widely used as the royal emblem of Mithradates VI Eupator (who for a time incorporated the city into his empire).

Some Byzantine coins of the 1st century BC and later show the head of Artemis with bow and quiver, and feature a crescent with what appears to be an eight-rayed star on the reverse. According to accounts which vary in some of the details, in 340 BC the Byzantines and their allies the Athenians were under siege by the troops of Philip of Macedon. On a particularly dark and wet night Philip attempted a surprise attack but was thwarted by the appearance of a bright light in the sky. This light is occasionally described by subsequent interpreters as a meteor, sometimes as the moon, and some accounts also mention the barking of dogs. However, the original accounts mention only a bright light in the sky, without specifying the moon. (Note: "In 340 BC, however, the Byzantines, with the aid of the Athenians, withstood a siege successfully, an occurrence the more remarkable as they were attacked by the greatest general of the age, Philip of Macedon. In the course of this beleaguerment, it is related, on a certain wet and moonless night the enemy attempted a surprise, but were foiled by reason of a bright light which, appearing suddenly in the heavens, startled all the dogs in the town and thus roused the garrison to a sense of their danger. To commemorate this timely phenomenon, which was attributed to Hecate, they erected a public statue to that goddess [...]") (Note: "If any goddess had a connection with the walls in Constantinople, it was Hecate. Hecate had a cult in Byzantium from the time of its founding. Like Byzas in one legend, she had her origins in Thrace. Since Hecate was the guardian of "liminal places," in Byzantium small temples in her honor were placed close to the gates of the city. Hecate's importance to Byzantium was above all as deity of protection. When Philip of Macedon was about to attack the city, according to the legend she alerted the townspeople with her ever-present torches, and with her pack of dogs, which served as her constant companions. Her mythic qualities thenceforth forever entered the fabric of Byzantine history. A statue known as the 'Lampadephoros' was erected on the hill above the Bosphorous to commemorate Hecate's defensive aid.") To commemorate the event the Byzantines erected a statue of Hecate lampadephoros (light-bearer or bringer). This story survived in the works of Hesychius of Miletus, who in all probability lived in the time of Justinian I. His works survive only in fragments preserved in Photius and the tenth century lexicographer Suidas. The tale is also related by Stephanus of Byzantium, and Eustathius.

Devotion to Hecate was especially favored by the Byzantines for her aid in having protected them from the incursions of Philip of Macedon. Her symbols were the crescent and star, and the walls of her city were her provenance. This contradicts claims that only the symbol of the crescent was meant to symbolize Hecate, whereas the star was only added later in order to symbolize the Virgin Mary, as Constantine I is said to have rededicated the city to her in the year 330.

It is unclear precisely how the symbol of Hecate/Artemis, one of many goddesses in local religion, (Note: "In 324 Byzantium had a number of operative cults to traditional gods and goddesses tied to its very foundation eight hundred years before. Rhea, called "the mother of the gods" by Zosimus, had a well-ensconced cult in Byzantium from its very foundation. [...] Devotion to Hecate was especially favored by the Byzantines [...] Constantine would also have found Artemis-Selene and Aphrodite along with the banished Apollo Zeuxippus on the Acropolis in the old Greek section of the city. Other gods mentioned in the sources are Athena, Hera, Zeus, Hermes, and Demeter and Kore. Even evidence of Isis and Serapis appears from the Roman era on coins during the reign of Caracalla and from inscriptions.") would have been transferred to the city itself, but it seems likely to have been an effect of being credited with the intervention against Philip and the subsequent honors. This was a common process in ancient Greece, as in Athens where the city was named after Athena in honor of such an intervention in time of war.

Cities in the Roman Empire often continued to issue their own coinage. "Of the many themes that were used on local coinage, celestial and astral symbols often appeared, mostly stars or crescent moons." The wide variety of these issues, and the varying explanations for the significance of the star and crescent on Roman coinage precludes their discussion here. It is, however, apparent that by the time of the Romans, coins featuring a star or crescent in some combination were not at all rare.

== People ==
- Homerus, tragedian, lived in the early 3rd century BC
- Philo, engineer, lived c. 280 BC – c. 220 BC
- Epigenes of Byzantium, astrologer, lived in the 3rd–2nd century BC
- Aristophanes of Byzantium, a scholar who flourished in Alexandria, 3rd–2nd century BC
- Myro, a Hellenistic female poet

== See also ==
- Sarayburnu, which is the geographic location of ancient Byzantium
- Timeline of Istanbul history

== Sources ==
- Balcer, Jack Martin (1990). "BYZANTIUM". In Yarshater, Ehsan (ed.). Encyclopædia Iranica. Vol. IV/6: Burial II–Calendars II. London and New York: Routledge & Kegan Paul. pp. 599–600. ISBN 978-0-71009-129-1.
- Harris, Jonathan, Constantinople: Capital of Byzantium (Hambledon/Continuum, London, 2007). ISBN 978-1-84725-179-4
- Jeffreys, Elizabeth and Michael, and Moffatt, Ann, Byzantine Papers: Proceedings of the First Australian Byzantine Studies Conference, Canberra, 17–19 May 1978 (Australian National University, Canberra, 1979).
- Istanbul Historical Information – Istanbul Informative Guide To The City. Retrieved January 6, 2005.
- The Useful Information about Istanbul Archived 2007-03-15 at the Wayback Machine. Retrieved January 6, 2005.
- The Oxford Dictionary of Byzantium (Oxford University Press, 1991) ISBN 0-19-504652-8
- Yeats, William Butler, "Sailing to Byzantium",
