= Alexandrian Pleiad =

The Alexandrian Pleiad is the name given to a group of seven Alexandrian poets and tragedians in the 3rd century BC (Alexandria was at that time the literary center of the Mediterranean) working in the court of Ptolemy II Philadelphus. The name derives from the seven stars of the Pleiades star cluster.

There are several conflicting lists of the greatest poets of the Alexandrian age (traditionally ascribed to Aristophanes of Byzantium and Aristarchus of Samothrace), which include the "Alexandrian Pleiad", some with tragic poets, other which include lyric or epic poets. The following members are always included in the "Alexandrian Pleiad":

- Homerus the Younger, son of Andromachus, from Byzantium, associated with "Tragic pleiad"
- Philiscus of Corcyra
- Lycophron
- Alexander Aetolus, tragic poet
- Sositheus of Alexandria, dramatist
- Aeantides, a poet traditionally associated with the "Tragic pleiad"

The other members are variously:

- Theocritus, who wrote the bucolic poems
- Aratus, who wrote the Phaenomena and other poems
- Nicander
- Apollonius, who wrote the Argonautica
- Sosiphanes of Syracuse, tragic poet
- Dionysiades

== Later uses ==
The name "Pléiade" was adopted in 1323 by a group of fourteen poets (seven men and seven women) in Toulouse and is used as well to refer to the group of poets around Pierre de Ronsard and Joachim du Bellay in France in the 16th century (see "La Pléiade"). In modern times, "pleiad" is also used as a collective noun for a small group of brilliant or eminent persons.

== Sources ==
- The Oxford Classical Dictionary. London: Oxford University Press, 1949.
