= Platonius =

Ancient Greek grammarian

Platonius (Ancient Greek: Πλατώνιος, Platonios) is the author of two writings on Greek comedy, which have been preserved in excerpts: On the Characteristics of Comedies (Περὶ διαφορᾶς κωμῳδιῶν) and On the Characteristics of Styles (Περὶ διαφορᾶς χαρακτήρων), which today form part of the collection Prolegomena de comoedia.

The time of his life is unknown; Georg Kaibel has speculated that Platonius lived in the 9th or 10th century. In his writings, Platonius talks about the differences between the old, middle and new comedy. Among other things, he claims that the old Attic comedy gave way to the middle one due to the suppression of political freedoms in Athens in the 4th century BC, but he does not name any poet of the middle comedy.
