= Amphilochus (mythology) =

Several men in Greek mythology

In Greek mythology, Amphilochus (Ancient Greek: Ἀμφίλοχος, romanized: Amphílokhos) can refer to any of these personages:

- Amphilochus, son Amphiaraus and Eriphyle and brother of Alcmaeon, one of the Epigoni who marched against Thebes to avenge their fathers.
- Amphilochus, son of Alcmaeon and Manto, brother of Tisiphone. Entrusted to king Creon and his queen to raise until he was reunited with his birth family.
- Amphilochus, son of Dryas and husband of Alcinoë, who deserted him and their children after falling in love with their guest Xanthus.

== Bibliography ==
- Apollodorus, The Library with an English Translation by Sir James George Frazer, F.B.A., F.R.S. in 2 Volumes, Cambridge, MA, Harvard University Press; London, William Heinemann Ltd. 1921. ISBN 0-674-99135-4. Online version at the Perseus Digital Library. Greek text available from the same website.
- Parthenius, Love Romances translated by Sir Stephen Gaselee (1882–1943), S. Loeb Classical Library Volume 69. Cambridge, MA. Harvard University Press. 1916. Online version at the Topos Text Project.
