= Antagoras of Rhodes =

Antagoras of Rhodes (Ancient Greek: Ἀνταγόρας ὁ Ῥόδιος, born on Rhodes about 270 B.C.) was a Greek poet. He was also noted for his cookery.

== Biographical information ==
Antagoras wrote a Theban epic whilst in Pella, and (extant) epigrams. Also was one of two attendant in the court of Antigonus II Gonatas, ruler of Macedonia Is recorded as having had some personal contact in his own time, with Philocydes (possibly envoy to Pharnabazus, son of Artabazus) and was known to Hegesander.

Famed for his repartee Antagoras was described by contemporaries as;

a terrible fellow to coin strange words

=== Conger eels account ===
Whilst on campaign in the Balkans, King Antigonos Gonatas—who had journeyed with Antagoras—found Antagoras inside camp to be cooking conger eels. When asked as to the likelihood of Homer being able to produce the Iliad should he have decided instead to use his time in cookery, Antagoras replied that he thought it unlikely that Agammemnon would have involved himself in any exploits at all if he had chosen to wander around his camp looking for men cooking conger eels.

In one account of the story Plutarch first writes of the value of seafood above the common staple (lentils) and, showing the relative costs of foods against each other, uses the examples of the persons Philoxenus the son of Eryxis, Androcydes the painter and Antagoras as examples for the preference of fish (a delicious food):

all Antigonus the king, surprising Antagoras the poet in the habit of a cook, broiling congers in his tent, said to him: Dost thou think that Homer was dressing congers when he writ Agamemnon's famous exploits? And he as smartly replied: Do you think that Agamemnon did so many famous exploits when he was inquiring who dressed congers in the camp?"

== See also ==
- Thebaid (a region of ancient Egypt)
- Thebais (a poem ) by Publius Papinius Statius
- Θηβαΐς (Thebaid)
