= Sositheus =

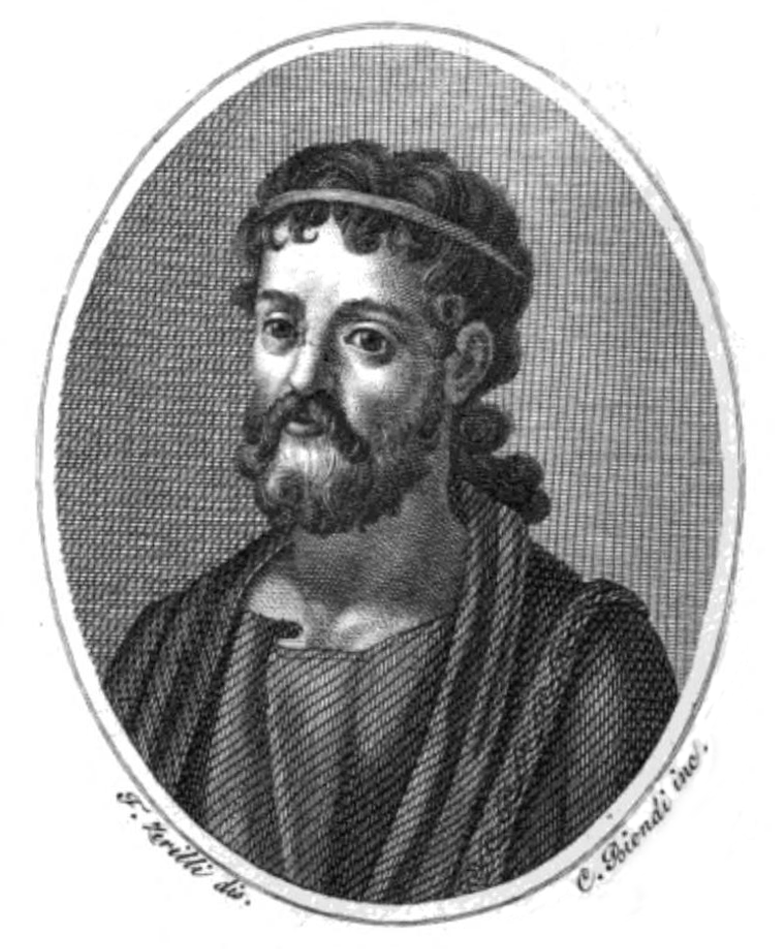
Portrait of Sositheus made in 1818

Sositheus (Ancient Greek: Σωσίθεος, c. 280 BC), a Greek tragic poet from Alexandria Troas, was a member of the Alexandrian "pleiad".

He must have resided at some time in Athens, since Diogenes Laërtius tells us that he attacked the Stoic Cleanthes on the stage, and was hissed off by the audience. As the Suda also calls him a Syracusan, it is conjectured that he belonged to the literary circle at the court of Hiero II.

According to an epigram of Dioscorides in the Greek Anthology (Anth. Pal. vii.707) he restored the satyric drama in its original form. A considerable fragment is extant of his pastoral play Daphnis or Lityerses, in which the Sicilian shepherd, in search of his love Pimplea, is brought into connexion with the Phrygian reaper, son of Midas, who slew all who unsuccessfully competed with him in reaping his grain. Heracles came to the aid of Daphnis and slew Lityerses.

See Otto Crusius s.v. Lityerses in Röscher's Lexikon der griechischen and römischen Mythologie. The fragment of twenty-one lines in Nauck's Tragicorum graecorum fragmenta apparently contains the beginning of the drama. Two lines from another play titled Aethlius (probably the traditional first king of Elis, father of Endymion) are quoted by Stobaeus (Flor. li. 23).
