= Contest of Cithaeron and Helicon =

Fragment of a poem by Corinna

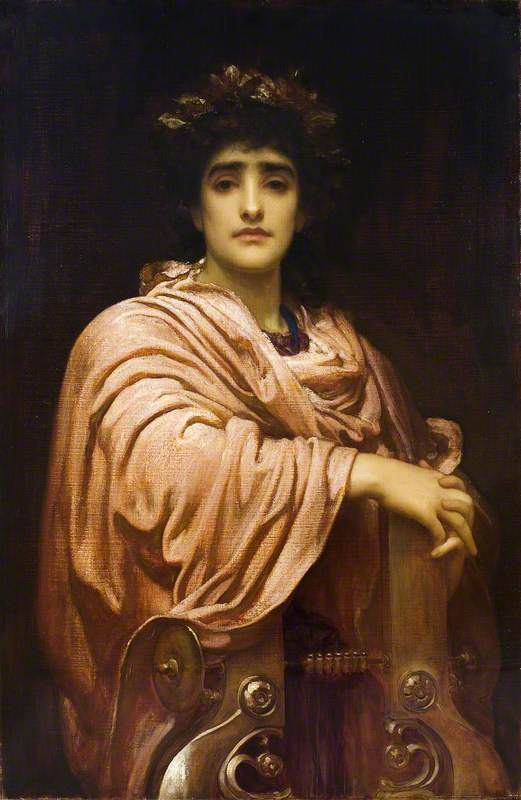
Corinna, by Frederick Leighton

The "Contest of Cithaeron and Helicon" (PMG 654) is a fragment of a poem by Corinna. Preserved on a second-century AD papyrus discovered at Hermopolis in Egypt, the poem tells the story of a singing competition between two mountains, Cithaeron and Helicon, which was apparently won by Mount Cithaeron. Twenty-three lines of the poem are relatively well-preserved; traces of a further eleven before this section and thirty after are visible.

== Preservation ==
The poem is preserved on a second-century AD piece of papyrus, P.Berol. 13284. The papyrus was discovered by Otto Rubensohn at Hermopolis in 1906. The papyrus also preserves part of Corinna's poem on the daughters of Asopus. The editio princeps of the papyrus was published by Wilamowitz in 1907.

Twenty-three lines of the poem (lines 12–34 of the first surviving column of the papyrus) are according to Denys Page "more or less continuously legible". Traces of eleven lines survive before the well-preserved portion of the poem. Based on the length the line-ends extend beyond the later part of the poem, Edgar Lobel suggested that they were in a different meter to the better-preserved portion of the poem. As the well-preserved portion clearly begins some way into the poem, Denys Page suggests that this can be explained either by the poem changing meter mid-way through, or by the Berlin Papyrus preserving only part of Corinna's original poem. Alternatively, A. E. Harvey argues that the anomaly is more likely explained as a copyist's error, with the scribe inserting line breaks in the wrong places. The poem continues for thirty lines after the well-preserved portion, but these are impossible to interpret.

== Poem ==
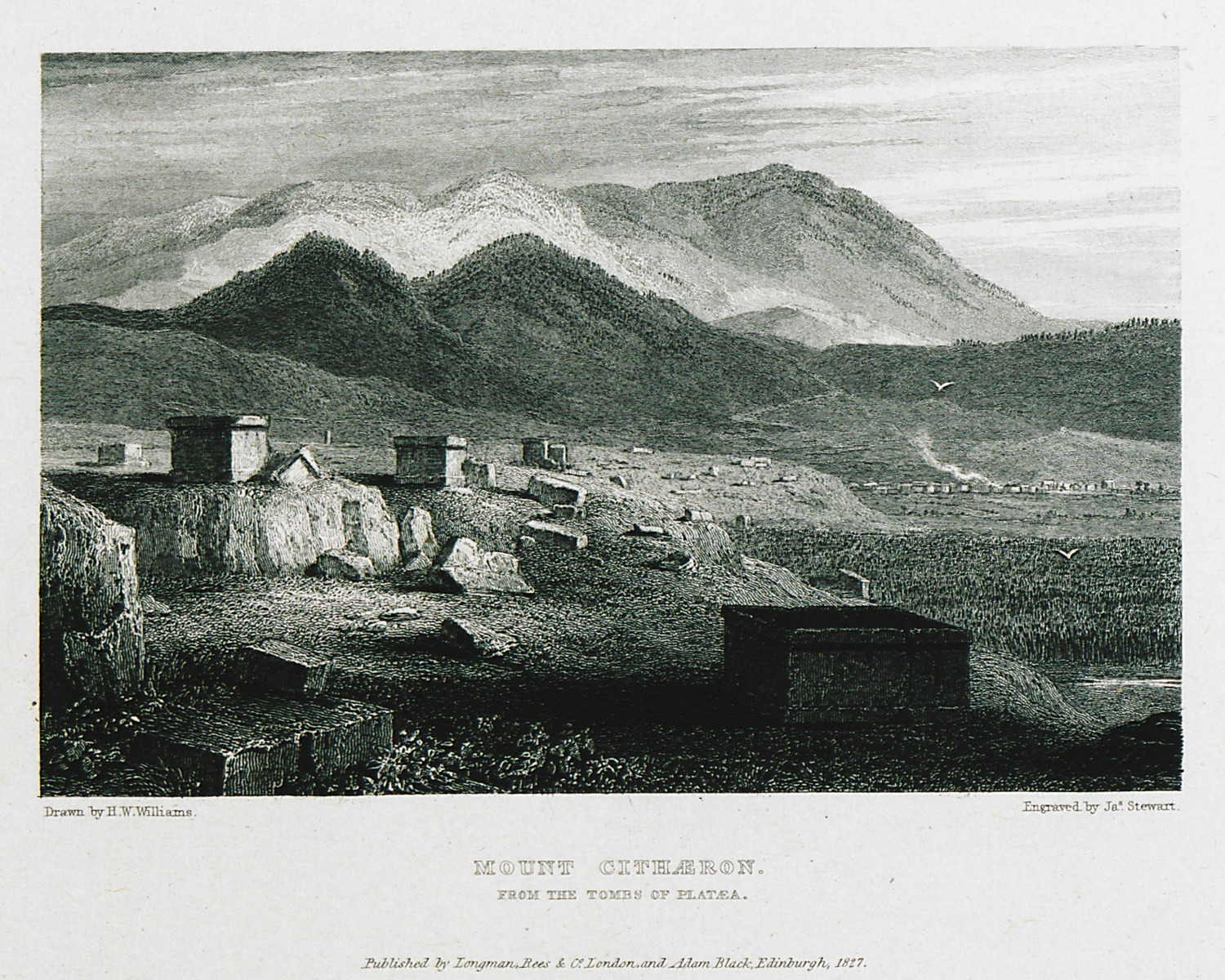
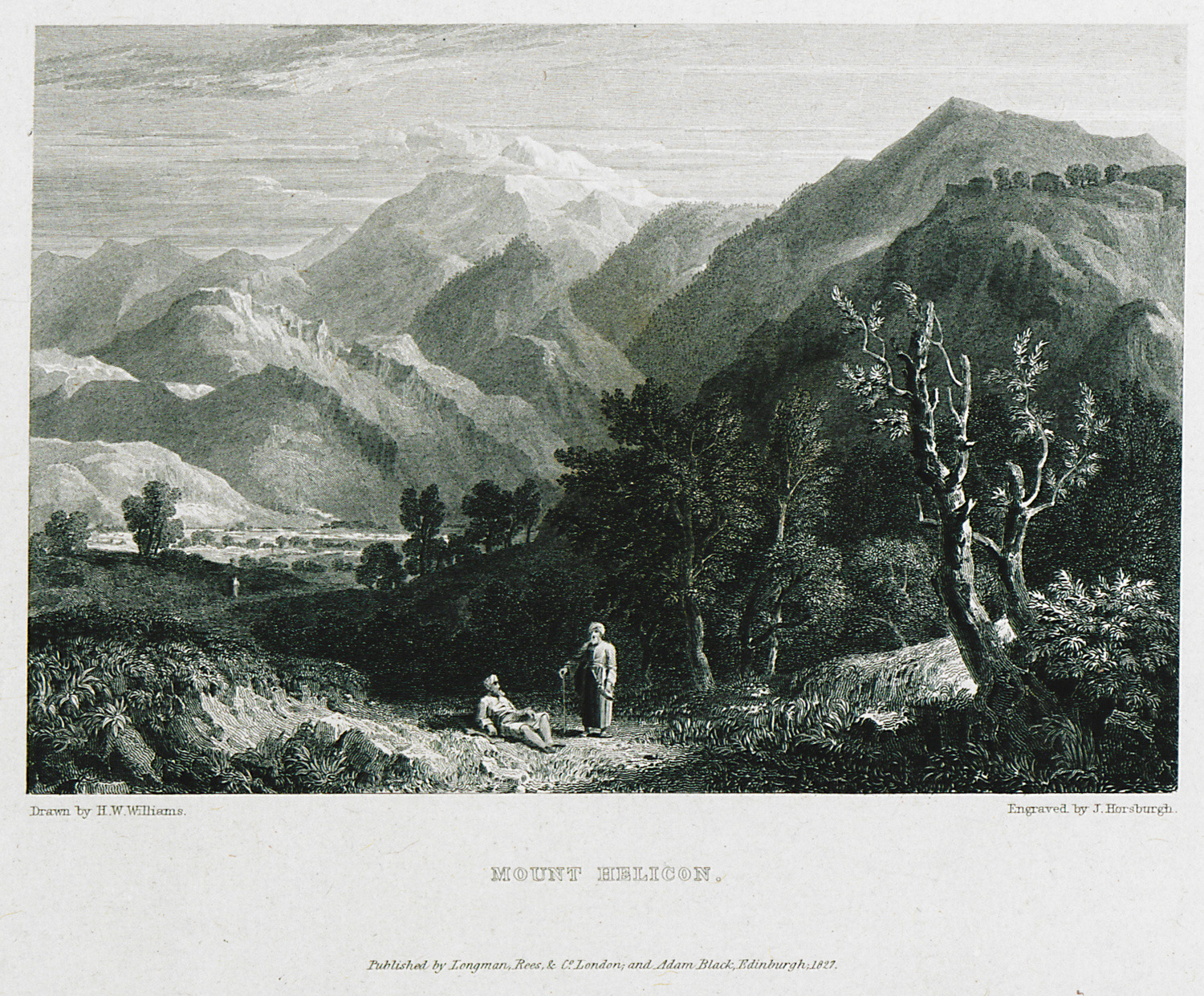
Mounts Cithaeron (left) and Helicon (right) by Hugh William Williams

The contest poem is about a singing contest between Cithaeron and Helicon. Conflict between these two mountains is known from other sources, but Corinna's poem is the only known mention of a singing contest between the two. In Corinna's poem, Cithaeron apparently wins the contest; in other versions of the story, Helicon is the victor.

The poem is composed in six-line stanzas, of which the first five are in ionic dimeter, and the sixth is a ten-syllable clasula, of the form uu--uu-u--. The surviving part of the poem begins with one of the singers – generally thought to be Cithaeron – concluding his song, which tells the myth of how the titan Rhea hid her youngest child, Zeus, from Cronus. The poem continues with the gods voting on the winner of the contest, and awarding the victory to Cithaeron. The vote is conducted in a form of secret ballot, using pebbles placed in jars. It is unknown if actual musical contests were judged in this way, or if Corinna's use of this voting system is intended to recall judicial procedure. After the result is announced, Helicon throws a down boulder in his anger, which breaks into ten thousand pieces. John Heath reads this episode as an example of a characteristic sense of humour in Corinna's poetry.

Corinna's use of the story of Rhea and the birth of Zeus in the poem is apparently influenced by Hesiod's account of the same myth in Theogony. There are several verbal echoes of Hesiod in Corinna's version of the story, though she also adds her own innovations – such as the inclusion of the Curetes, which are not mentioned in the Theogony. Corinna's version of the poem emphasises the role of Rhea, and Diane Rayor argues that this is an example of Corinna writing for a specifically female audience. Marilyn B. Skinner, however, argues that Corinna depicts Rhea's actions from a patriarchal perspective. Dee Clayman has suggested that the two mountains in the poem represent Corinna and Pindar, with Corinna triumphing. Athanassios Vergados instead suggests that Helicon represented Hesiod, and its song would have closely followed the narrative of the Theogony; in this reading Corinna presents herself as Cithaeron in dialogue with Hesiod.

== Performance ==
Corinna's poems were probably mostly written for choral performance in connection with local festivals. The contest poem may have been written for performance at the Daedala, a festival in honour of Hera at Plataea, which was held in part at the summit of Mount Cithaeron.

== Works cited ==
- "P. Berol 13284". Berliner Papyrusdatenbank.
- Campbell, David A. (1967). Greek Lyric Poetry: A Selection of Early Greek Lyric, Elegiac and Iambic Poetry. Macmillan.
- Collins, Derek (2006). "Corinna and Mythological Innovation". The Classical Quarterly. 56 (1): 19–32. doi:10.1017/S0009838806000036. S2CID 171018980.
- Harvey, A. E. (1955). "A Note on the Berlin Papyrus of Corinna". The Classical Quarterly. 5 (3). JSTOR 637389.
- Heath, John (2017). "Corinna's 'Old Wives' Tales'". Harvard Studies in Classical Philology. 109.
- Henderson, W. J. (1995). "Corinna of Tanagra on Poetry". Acta Classica. 38.
- Larmour, David H. J. (2005). "Corinna's Metis and the Epinikian Tradition". In Greene, Ellen (ed.). Women Poets in Ancient Greece and Rome. University of Oklahoma Press.
- Page, Denys (1962). Poetae Melici Graeci. Oxford University Press.
- Page, Denys L. (1963) [1953]. Corinna. London: The Society for the Promotion of Hellenic Studies.
- Rayor, Diane (1993). "Korinna: Gender and the Narrative Tradition". Arethusa. 26 (3).
- Vergados, Athanassios (2012). "Corinna's Poetic Mountains: PMG 654 col. i 1–34 and Hesiodic Reception". Classical Philology. 107 (2): 101–118. doi:10.1086/664026. S2CID 162346852.
