= Dionysiades =

Ancient Greek tragic poet

Dionysiades (Ancient Greek: Διονυσιάδης) of Tarsus was an ancient Greek tragic poet who lived in the time of Alexander the Great (second half of the 4th century BC). According to Strabo, he was the best of the tragic poets included in the so-called Alexandrian Pleiad. It is not certain whether he is identical with Dionysiades of Mallus in Cilicia, also a tragic poet, who wrote a work entitled Styles or Lovers of Comedy (Ancient Greek: Χαρακτῆρες ἢ Φιλοκωμῳδοί), "in which he describes (ἀπαγγέλλει) the styles of [comic] poets". This work was perhaps the first attempt to distinguish and define the styles of Attic comic poets. The Suda mentions that Dionysiades of Mallus was a member of the Pleiad and his father was named Phylarchides.
