= Alcinoë (daughter of Polybus) =

Princess in Greek mythology

In Greek mythology, Alcinoë (/ælˈsɪnoʊ.iː/; Ancient Greek: Ἀλκινόη, romanized: Alkinóē, lit. 'mighty-minded') is a young princess of Corinth, daughter of King Polybus of Corinth, and sister to Oedipus. Greek grammarian Parthenius of Nicaea preserves her story in his Erotica Pathemata ("sorrows about love"), which he attributes to the Hellenistic poetess Moero.

== Etymology ==
Alcinoë's name is the feminine version of Alcinoös. The name derives from the ancient Greek words ἀλκή (alkḗ), meaning "strength, prowess" or "courage", and νόος (nóos), meaning "mind". Thus her name translates to 'strong-minded'.

== Family ==
Alcinoë was the daughter of King Polybus of Corinth (possibly by his wife, the queen Periboea). She had an elder (foster) brother named Oedipus. Alcinoë married a man named Amphilochus, by whom she had children of unspecified number and sex.

== Mythology ==
As a married woman, Alcinoë hired a spinner named Nicandra to spin and create textiles for her for a year. When the year had passed and Alcinoë had to pay the wages Nicandra was due, she instead drove her out of the house without giving the full price agreed beforehand. The angered Nicandra then prayed to Athena, the goddess of weaving, to see upon and take revenge for the injustice she had suffered.

Sometime later, a stranger from the island of Samos called Xanthus came to visit. By the wrath of Athena, who had decided it was finally time to enact the woman's punishment, Alcinoë was inflicted with great passion for the man, and became infatuated with him. Eventually her love reached such a state that she decided to elope with him, leaving behind her homeland, her husband and her little children without a second thought.

The happy couple sailed away in bliss, but in the middle of the voyage she came back to her senses and the gravity of her actions hit her. She shed many bitter tears of despair, calling out the names of the husband and children she had left behind. Xanthus tried to comfort her and promised Alcinoë he would make her his lawful wife, but she was inconsolable and nothing he would say reached her. In the end, the weeping Alcinoë threw herself into the deep waves of the sea and drowned.

== In culture ==
=== Origins ===
Our sole source for Alcinoë, Parthenius of Nicaea, attributed the myth to Hellenistic poetess Moero and her now entirely lost poem Curses (Ancient Greek: Ἀραί, romanized: Araí), a genre of Hellenistic poetry that served as an over-the-top appeal to justice and vengeance, with a detailed list of preferred punishments—usually highly disproportionate, ranging from cannibalism to incest—against the wrong doer. Parthenius' other inaccurate source attributions shed a degree of uncertainty over how much his surviving tale resembles the lost one Moero wrote down.

In comparison to other examples of Hellenistic sensationalism, Alcinoë's tale is rather tame, with no elements of exceptional horror or a shocking death. It has been noted that Athena's method of punishment is not the typical of the virgin goddesses, and more in line with Aphrodite's course of action, while the name 'Alcinoë' is similar to Alcyone, a name of other heroines who died by drowning. Her elopement with Xanthus is analogous to Helen's own with the Trojan prince Paris; ironically however, xanthos is a common epithet of Menelaus, Helen's wronged husband.

=== Influence ===
It has been noted that Alcinoë's short myth shares many plot points with Russian writer Leo Tolstoy's novel Anna Karenina; the two stories share elements of the injustice inflicted on the lower class by the aristocrats, and the miconducts of an infidelious wife who abandons her husband and offspring for the sake of a new lover. Unlike Alcinoë, Anna is not cursed by a goddess, but both women are faced with an infatuation they are unable to control, and end up taking their lives once remorse over the serparation from the husband and children sets in.

It is possible, but not definitive or provable, that Tolstoy might have been inspired by this myth to write Anna Karenina; in his notes he mentions reading the works of an author named Parthenius in 1878, although whether he had read the Erotica Pathemata before the 19th March 1873, when he started writing the book, remains unknown.

== See also ==
- Arachne
- Leucippus
- Gerana

== Bibliography ==
- Bell, Robert E. (1991). Women of Classical Mythology: A Biographical Dictionary. ABC-Clio. ISBN 9780874365818.
- Finch, Chauncey E. (1953). "The Influence of Parthenius in Tolstoy's Anna Karenina". The Classical Weekly. 46 (6): 81–83. doi:10.2307/4343293. JSTOR 4343293.
- Liddell, Henry George; Scott, Robert (1940). A Greek-English Lexicon, revised and augmented throughout by Sir Henry Stuart Jones with the assistance of Roderick McKenzie. Oxford: Clarendon Press. Online version at Perseus.tufts project.
- March, Jennifer R. (May 31, 2014). Dictionary of Classical Mythology. Oxbow Books. ISBN 978-1-78297-635-6.
- Parthenius, Love Romances translated by Sir Stephen Gaselee (1882–1943), S. Loeb Classical Library Volume 69. Cambridge, MA. Harvard University Press. 1916. Online version at the Topos Text Project.
- Skinner, Marylin B. (2005). "Homer's Mother". In Greene, Ellen (ed.). Women Poets in Ancient Greece and Rome. University of Oklahoma Press. ISBN 978-0-8061-3663-9.
