= Polybus of Corinth =

Mythological king of Corinth

Polybus (Ancient Greek: Πόλυβος) is a figure in Greek mythology. He was the king of Corinth whose wife was variously referred to as Periboea, Merope or Medusa, daughter of Orsilochus.

== Mythology ==
Polybus reigned over the city like a gentle man and loved his wife, but their marriage remained childless for many years. When Oedipus was abandoned as an infant by his parents Laius and Jocasta, the rulers of Thebes, Periboea, who was then washing garments at the shore, found and rescued him. In other accounts, either shepherds or keepers of horses of Polybus found the small child in Mount Cithaeron and brought him to Periboea; in other versions, Laius' household slaves, who were unwilling to expose the child, gave him as a present to the wife of Polybus, since she could bear no children.

With Polybus' consent, since they were childless, they adopted and raised him as their own son, and after his wife had healed the child's ankles, Periboea called him Oedipus, giving him that name on account of his swollen feet caused by injuries in his ankles. A few years later, Periboea became pregnant herself and gave birth to a daughter Alcinoë to Polybus.

After Oedipus had come to manhood, he was courageous beyond the rest and exceeded his fellows in strength. His companions taunted him with not being Polybus' son, since Polybus was so mild, and Oedipus was so assertive. Oedipus asked Periboea about his origins, but could learn nothing from her. Fearing that the taunt was true, he set out for Delphi and sought the truth about his true parents. The god told him not to go to his native land because, "You shall kill your father and marry your mother".

On hearing that, horrified by that prophecy and believing Polybus and Merope to be his parents, Oedipus imposed self-exile upon himself and kept away from Corinth, as he resolved never to murder King Polybus, who had been a kind father to him, or to marry Merope, to whom he had no unnatural attraction. While riding in a chariot through Phocis he fell in with Laius driving in a chariot in a certain narrow road. When Laius in a disdainful manner ordered Oedipus to make way for him, the latter in anger slew Laius, not knowing that he was his father.

Many years later, after Oedipus won the kingship of Thebes by defeating the Sphinx, a plague attacked Thebes. King Oedipus, in his effort to find the cause of plague due to a patricide, revealed that he was told in his teen years that he was destined to murder his father, and sent a spy to Corinth to see who was currently on the throne. The news of Polybus' death by natural causes was announced by the messenger to Jocasta in Sophocles' Oedipus Rex. Oedipus mistakenly took that to mean that he had not killed his father and that the prophecy that he would murder his father and marry his mother would be false. Oedipus only learns at the end of the play that Polybus was in fact his adoptive father and that he did kill his true father, King Laius.
