= Achaean Leaders =

Greek mythological figures in the Trojan War

In Greek mythology, the Achaean Leaders were those who led the expedition to Troy to retrieve the abducted Helen, wife of Menelaus, king of Sparta. Most of the leaders were bound by the Oath of Tyndareus who made the Suitors of Helen swear that they would defend and protect the chosen husband of Helen against any wrong done against him in regard to his marriage.

== List of leaders ==
=== Number of ships ===
List of Achaean Leaders and their Catalogue of Ships
Ethnicity	Leader	Suitor of Helen	Sources													
Ethnicity	Leader	Suitor of Helen	Homer	Ships	Euripides	Ships	Apollodorus	Ships	Dictys	Ships	Hyginus	Ships	Malalas	Ships	Dares	Ships
Boeotians	Thersander		✓	50 of 120 men each			10 leaders	40	✓	50						
Boeotians	Peneleos	✓	✓	50 of 120 men each			10 leaders	40	✓	50	✓	12	✓	50		
Boeotians	Leitus	✓	✓	50 of 120 men each	✓	50	10 leaders	40	✓	50	✓	12	✓	50		
Boeotians	Clonius		✓	50 of 120 men each			10 leaders	40	✓	50	✓	9	✓	50		
Boeotians	Arcesilaus		✓	50 of 120 men each			10 leaders	40	✓	50			✓	50	✓	50
Boeotians	Prothoenor						10 leaders	40	✓	50			✓	50	✓	50
Minyans (Orchomenians)	Ascalaphus	✓	✓	30			4 leaders	30	✓	30	✓	30	✓	30	✓	30
Minyans (Orchomenians)	Ialmenus	✓	✓	30			4 leaders	30	✓	30	✓	30	✓	30	✓	30
Phocēans	Epistrophus	✓	✓	40			4 leaders	40	✓	50	✓	10	✓	40	✓	40
Phocēans	Schedius	✓	✓	40			4 leaders	40					✓	40	✓	40
Locrians	Ajax the Lesser	✓	✓	40	✓	(50?)	✓	40	✓	40	✓	20	✓	9	✓	37
Abantes of Euboea	Elephenor	✓	✓	40			✓	40	✓	40	✓	30	✓	60		
Athenians	Menestheus	✓	✓	50			✓	50	✓	50	✓	50	✓	50	✓	50
Athenians	Acamas		✓	50												
Athenians	Demophon		✓	50	✓	60										
Salamineans	Ajax	✓	✓	12	✓	12	✓	12	✓	12	✓	12	✓	12	✓	11?
Salamineans	Teucer	✓									✓	12			✓	11?
Argives	Diomedes	✓	✓	80	✓	50	✓	80	✓	80	✓	30	✓	80	✓	80
Argives	Sthenelus	✓	✓	80	✓	50					✓	25			✓	80
Argives	Euryalus		✓	80	✓	50					✓	15			✓	80
Argives	Amphilochus	✓														
Argives	Phoenix										✓	50				
Argives	Cycnus										✓	12				
Mycenaeans	Agamemnon		✓	100	✓	100	✓	100	✓	100	✓	100	✓	100 + 30	✓	100
Mycenaeans	Adrastus				✓	100										
Mycenaeans	Amarynceus										✓	19				
Mycenaeans	Nereus												✓	3		
Lacedaemonians	Menelaus	✓	✓	60	✓	?	✓	60	✓	60	✓	60			✓	60
No name given.	Nestor		✓	90	✓	50	✓	40	✓	90	✓	90	✓	90	✓	80
No name given.	Antilochus	✓									✓	20				
Arcadians	Agapenor	✓	✓	60			✓	7	✓	60*	✓	60			✓	60
Epeans of Elis	Amphimachus	✓	✓	40			✓	40	✓	40	✓	10	✓	40	✓	40
Epeans of Elis	Thalpius	✓	✓	40					✓	40			✓	40	✓	40
Epeans of Elis	Diōres		✓	40					✓	40			✓	40	✓	40
Epeans of Elis	Polyxenus	✓	✓	40					✓	40	✓	40			✓	40
Epeans of Elis	Eurytus				✓	?										
Taphians	Eurytus				✓	?										
Taphians	Meges	✓	✓	40	✓	?	✓	40	✓	40	✓	60				
Men of Dulichium	Meges	✓	✓	40	✓	?	✓	40	✓	40	✓	60	✓	40		
Cephallenians	Odysseus	✓	✓	12	✓	?	✓	12	✓	12	✓	12	✓	12	✓	12
Aetolians	Thoas	✓	✓	40			✓	40	✓	40	✓	15	✓	40	✓	40
Cretans	Idomeneus	✓	✓	80			✓	40	✓	80			✓	80	✓	80
Cretans	Meriones	✓	✓	80	✓	?			✓	80	✓	40	✓	80	✓	80
Rhodians	Tlepolemus	✓	✓	9			✓	9	✓	9	✓	9	✓	9	✓	9
Symians	Nireus	✓	✓	3	✓	?	✓	3	✓	3	✓	16			✓	53
No name given	Phidippus	✓	✓	30			✓	30	✓	30			✓	68	✓	30
No name given	Antiphus		✓	30			✓	30	✓	30	✓	20	✓	68	✓	30
No name given	Sorthes												✓	68		
Pelasgians, Myrmidons, Hellenes, Achaeans	Achilles		✓	50	✓	50	✓	50	✓	50	✓	50	✓	50	✓	50
Pelasgians, Myrmidons, Hellenes, Achaeans	Patroclus	✓									✓	10	✓	50	✓	50
Pelasgians, Myrmidons, Hellenes, Achaeans	Neoptolemus															50
No name given (Scyrians)	Automedon										✓	10				
No name given	Protesilaus	✓	✓	40	✓	?	✓	40	✓	40	(✓)		✓	40	✓	40
No name given	Podarces	✓	✓	40					✓	40	✓	10	✓	40	✓	40
No name given	Eumelus	✓	✓	11	✓	?	✓	11	✓	11	✓	8	✓	11	✓	10
Mothone	Philoctetes	✓	✓	7			✓	7	✓	7	✓	7	✓	22	✓	7
Mothone	Medon		✓	7												
No name given	Machaon	✓	✓	30					✓	30	✓	20			✓	32
No name given	Podalirius	✓	✓	30			✓	30	✓	30	✓	9			✓	32
Asterion	Eurypylus	✓	✓	40			✓	40	✓	40	✓	40	✓	40	✓	40
Lapiths	Leonteus	✓	✓	40					✓	40	✓	19	✓	30	✓	40
Lapiths	Polypoetes	✓	✓	40			✓	30	✓	40	✓	20	✓	30	✓	40
Enienes,	Guneus		✓	22	✓	12	✓	22	✓	22					✓	21
Peraebi	Nereus												✓	22		
Magnetes	Prothous	✓	✓	40			✓	40	✓	40	✓	40	✓	40	✓	40
Magnetes	Magnitor												✓	40		
No name given	Palamedes				✓	?							✓	12		
Tricca	Calchas								✓	20			✓	40		
No name given	Mopsus								✓	20						
No name given	Epeius								✓	30						
No name given	Agenor												✓	60		
No name given	Teuthis												✓	60		
Amphigenia	Amphigenias												✓	43		
TOTAL	63	39	49	1,186	21	434?										

=== Ethnicity ===
Ethnic group	Contingent		Leader	Parentage	Abode
Boeotians	• Anthedon • Arne • Aulis • Copae • Coroneia • Eilesium • Eleon • Erythrae • Eteonus • Eutresis • Glisas • Graia • Haliartus • Harma • Hyle	• Hyria • Medeon • Mycalessus • Midea • Nisa • Ocalea • Onchestos • Peteon • Plataea • Schoenus • Scolus • Thebes • Thespeia • Thisbe	Thersander	son of Polynices and Argea	Thebes
Boeotians	• Anthedon • Arne • Aulis • Copae • Coroneia • Eilesium • Eleon • Erythrae • Eteonus • Eutresis • Glisas • Graia • Haliartus • Harma • Hyle	• Hyria • Medeon • Mycalessus • Midea • Nisa • Ocalea • Onchestos • Peteon • Plataea • Schoenus • Scolus • Thebes • Thespeia • Thisbe	Peneleos	son of Hippalcimus and Asterope	Boeotia
Boeotians	• Anthedon • Arne • Aulis • Copae • Coroneia • Eilesium • Eleon • Erythrae • Eteonus • Eutresis • Glisas • Graia • Haliartus • Harma • Hyle	• Hyria • Medeon • Mycalessus • Midea • Nisa • Ocalea • Onchestos • Peteon • Plataea • Schoenus • Scolus • Thebes • Thespeia • Thisbe	Leitus	son Alector and Polybule or of Lacritus and Cleobule or of Gaia (Earth)	Boeotia
Boeotians	• Anthedon • Arne • Aulis • Copae • Coroneia • Eilesium • Eleon • Erythrae • Eteonus • Eutresis • Glisas • Graia • Haliartus • Harma • Hyle	• Hyria • Medeon • Mycalessus • Midea • Nisa • Ocalea • Onchestos • Peteon • Plataea • Schoenus • Scolus • Thebes • Thespeia • Thisbe	Clonius	son of Alegenor or of Alector and Acteis or of Lacritus and Cleobule	Boeotia
Boeotians	• Anthedon • Arne • Aulis • Copae • Coroneia • Eilesium • Eleon • Erythrae • Eteonus • Eutresis • Glisas • Graia • Haliartus • Harma • Hyle	• Hyria • Medeon • Mycalessus • Midea • Nisa • Ocalea • Onchestos • Peteon • Plataea • Schoenus • Scolus • Thebes • Thespeia • Thisbe	Arcesilaus	son of Areilycus and Theobule or of Alector and Cleobule	Boeotia
Boeotians	• Anthedon • Arne • Aulis • Copae • Coroneia • Eilesium • Eleon • Erythrae • Eteonus • Eutresis • Glisas • Graia • Haliartus • Harma • Hyle	• Hyria • Medeon • Mycalessus • Midea • Nisa • Ocalea • Onchestos • Peteon • Plataea • Schoenus • Scolus • Thebes • Thespeia • Thisbe	Prothoenor	son of Areilycus and Theobule or of Alector and Arteis	Boeotia
Minyans	• Aspledon	• Orchomenus	Ascalaphus	sons of Ares and Astyoche	Orchomenus
Minyans	• Aspledon	• Orchomenus	Ialmenus	sons of Ares and Astyoche	Orchomenus
Phocēans	• Anemorea • river Cephissus • Crisa • Cyparissus • Daulis	• Hyampolis • Lilaea • Panopeus • Pytho	Epistrophus	sons of Iphitus and Hippolyte or Thrasybule	Crissa
Phocēans	• Anemorea • river Cephissus • Crisa • Cyparissus • Daulis	• Hyampolis • Lilaea • Panopeus • Pytho	Schedius	sons of Iphitus and Hippolyte or Thrasybule	Crissa
Locrians	• Augeae • Bessa • Calliarus • Kynos	• Opoüs • Scarphe • Tarphe • Thronium	Ajax the Lesser	son of Oileus and Eriopis or Rhene	Opuntian Locris
Abantes of Euboea	• Carystus • Cerinthus • Chalcis • Eretria	• Dium • Histiaea • Styra	Elephenor	son of Chalcodon by either Imenarete, Melanippe or Alcyone.	Euboea
Athenians	• Athens		Menestheus	son of Peteos and either Polyxene or Mnesimache	Athens
Athenians	• Athens		Acamas	son of Theseus and Phaedra	Athens
Athenians	• Athens		Demophon	son of Theseus and Phaedra or Iope	Athens
Salamineans	• Salamis		Ajax	son of Telamon and Periboea	Salamis
Salamineans	• Salamis		Teucer	son of Telamon and Hesione	Salamis
Argives	• Aegina • Argos • Asine • Eїonae • Epidaurus	• Hermione • Mases • Tiryns • Troezen	Diomedes	son of Tydeus and Deipyle	Argos
Argives	• Aegina • Argos • Asine • Eїonae • Epidaurus	• Hermione • Mases • Tiryns • Troezen	Sthenelus	son of Capaneus and Evadne	Argos
Argives	• Aegina • Argos • Asine • Eїonae • Epidaurus	• Hermione • Mases • Tiryns • Troezen	Euryalus	son of Mecisteus and Astyoche	Argos
Argives	• Aegina • Argos • Asine • Eїonae • Epidaurus	• Hermione • Mases • Tiryns • Troezen	Amphilochus	son of Amphiaraus and Eriphyle	Argos
Mycenaeans	• Aegium • Araethyrea • Cleonae • Corinth • Gonoessa • Helice	• Hyperesia • Mycenae • Orneae • Pellene • Sicyon	Agamemnon	sons of Atreus and Aerope or Pleisthenes and Cleolla	Mycenae
Lacedaemonians	• Amyclae • Augeae • Bryseae • Helos • Laas	• Messe • Oetylus • Pharis • Sparta	Menelaus	sons of Atreus and Aerope or Pleisthenes and Cleolla	Sparta
No name given.	• Aipy • Amphigenea • Arēne • Cyparisseis • Dorium,	• Helos • Pteleum • Pylos • Thryum	Nestor	son of Neleus and Chloris	Pylos
No name given.	• Aipy • Amphigenea • Arēne • Cyparisseis • Dorium,	• Helos • Pteleum • Pylos • Thryum	Antilochus	son of Nestor either by Anaxibia or Eurydice.	Pylos
Arcadians	• Cyllene • Enispe • Mantinea • Orchomenus • Parrhasia	• Pheneus • Rhipae • Stratie • Stymphalos • Tegea	Agapenor	son of Ancaeus and Iotis	Arcadia
Epeans of Elis	• Alesium • Buprasium • Hyrmine	• Myrsinus • Olene	Amphimachus	son of Cteatus and Theronice	Elis
Epeans of Elis	• Alesium • Buprasium • Hyrmine	• Myrsinus • Olene	Thalpius	son of Eurytus and Theraephone	Elis
Epeans of Elis	• Alesium • Buprasium • Hyrmine	• Myrsinus • Olene	Diōres	son of Amarynceus and Mnesimache	Elis
Epeans of Elis	• Alesium • Buprasium • Hyrmine	• Myrsinus • Olene	Polyxenus	son of Agasthenes and Peloris	Elis
Men of Dulichium	• Dulichium	• Echinean Islands	Meges	son of Phyleus either by Eustyoche, Ctimene, Timandra, Hagnete or Ctesimache	Dulichium
Cephallenians	• Aegilips • Crocylea • Ithaca	• Neritum • Same • Zacynthus	Odysseus	son of Laertes or Sisyphus and Anticleia	Ithaca
Aetolians	• Calydon • Chalcis • Olenus	• Pleuron • Pylene	Thoas	son of Andraemon and Gorge	Calydon
Cretans	• Knossos • Gortys • Lycastus • Lyktos	• Miletus • Phaistos • Rhytium	Idomeneus	son of Deucalion and Cleopatra	Crete
Cretans	• Knossos • Gortys • Lycastus • Lyktos	• Miletus • Phaistos • Rhytium	Meriones	son of Molus and Melphis or Euippe	Crete
Rhodians	• Cameirus • Ielysus	• Lindus	Tlepolemus	son of Heracles and Astyoche or Astydameia	Rhodes
Symians	• Symi		Nireus	son of Charopus and Aglaea	Syme
No name given.	• Calydnian Islands • Casus, • Cos	• Crapathus • Nisyrus	Phidippus	sons of Thessalus	Cos
No name given.	• Calydnian Islands • Casus, • Cos	• Crapathus • Nisyrus	Antiphus	sons of Thessalus	Cos
Pelasgians, Myrmidons, Hellenes, Achaeans	• Alope • Alos • Pelasgic Argos	• Phthia • Trachis	Achilles	son of Peleus and Thetis	Phtia
Pelasgians, Myrmidons, Hellenes, Achaeans	• Alope • Alos • Pelasgic Argos	• Phthia • Trachis	Neoptolemus	son of Achilles and Deidamia	Phtia
Pelasgians, Myrmidons, Hellenes, Achaeans	• Alope • Alos • Pelasgic Argos	• Phthia • Trachis	Patroclus	son of Menoetius by either Sthenele, Periopis or Polymele	Phtia
No name given	• Antrium • Iton • Phylace	• Pyrasus • Pteleum	Protesilaus	sons of Iphiclus and Diomedeia or of Phylacus and Astyoche	Phylace
No name given	• Antrium • Iton • Phylace	• Pyrasus • Pteleum	Podarces	sons of Iphiclus and Diomedeia or of Phylacus and Astyoche	Phylace
No name given	• Boebe • Glaphyrae	• Iolcus • Pherae	Eumelus	son of Admetus and Alcestis	Pherae
No name given	• Meliboea • Methone	• Thaumacia	Philoctetes	son of Poeas	Meliboea
No name given	• Meliboea • Methone	• Thaumacia	Medon	son of Oileus and Rhene	Meliboea
No name given	• Ithome • Oechalia	• Tricca	Machaon	sons of Asclepius	Tricca
No name given	• Ithome • Oechalia	• Tricca	Podalirius	sons of Asclepius	Tricca
No name given	• Asterius • Hypereia (fountain)	• Ormenius • Titanus	Eurypylus	son of Euaemon and Deipyle (Deityche) or Ops	Ormenios
Lapiths	• Argissa • Elone • Gyrtone	• Oloösson • Orthe	Leonteus	son of Coronus	Gyrtonne
Lapiths	• Argissa • Elone • Gyrtone	• Oloösson • Orthe	Polypoetes	son of Pirithous and Hippodamia	Gyrtonne
Enienes, Peraebi	• Cyphus • Dodona (Thessalian)	• Gonnos • Titaresius	Guneus	son of Ocytus by either Aurophyte or Tauropoleia or Hippodameia	
Magnetes	• Peneus	• Mt. Pelion	Prothous	son of Tenthredon and Eurymache or Cleobule	Magnesia
No name given	• Acarnania		Calchas	son of Thestor and Polymele	
No name given	• Colophon		Mopsus	son of Manto and Rhacius or Apollo	
No name given	• Islands of the Cyclades		Epeus	son of Panopeus and Asterodia	

== See also ==
- Catalogue of Ships
- Suitors of Helen
- Trojan Leaders
- Trojan War
