= Catalogue of Ships =

Part of Iliad, listing towns, war leaders and number of ships

The Catalogue of Ships (Ancient Greek: νεῶν κατάλογος, neōn katálogos) is an epic catalogue in Book 2 of Homer's Iliad (2.494–759), which lists the contingents of the Achaean army that sailed to Troy. The catalogue gives the names of the leaders of each contingent, lists the settlements in the kingdom represented by the contingent, sometimes with a descriptive epithet that fills out a half-verse or articulates the flow of names and parentage and place, and gives the number of ships required to transport the men to Troy, offering further differentiations of weightiness. A similar, though shorter, Catalogue of the Trojans and their allies follows (2.816–877). A similar catalogue appears in the Pseudo-Apollodoran Bibliotheca.

== Historical background ==
Map of Homeric Greece

In the debate since antiquity over the Catalogue of Ships, the core questions have concerned the extent of historical credibility of the account, whether it was composed by Homer himself, to what extent it reflects a pre-Homeric document or memorized tradition, surviving perhaps in part from Mycenaean times, or whether it is a result of post-Homeric development. According to some scholars, the inconsistencies between the Catalogue and the rest of the text and also the odd way it is inserted into the poem suggest that it was a later addition. Wilhelm Dörpfeld notes that while in the Odyssey Odysseus's kingdom includes Ithaca, Same, Dulichium, and Zacynthus, the Catalogue of Ships contains a different list of islands, again Ithaca, Same, and Zacynthus but now also Neritum, Krocylea, and Aegilips. The separate debate over the identity of Homer and the authorship of the Iliad and the Odyssey is conventionally termed "the Homeric Question".

The consensus before the mid-twentieth century was that the Catalogue of Ships was not the work of the man who composed the Iliad, (Note: Succinctly expressed by C.M. Bowra (1933), which is a review of F. Jacoby's The introduction of the Ships Catalogue into the Iliad (1932).) though great pains had been taken to render it a work of art; (Note: Crossett (1969) discusses the dramatic function of the Catalogue in the place that it occupies.) furthermore, that the material of the text is essentially Mycenaean or sub-Mycenaean, while disagreement centers largely on the extent of later additions.

If taken to be an accurate account, the Catalogue provides a rare summary of the geopolitical situation in early Greece at some time between the Late Bronze Age and the eighth century BCE. Following Milman Parry's theory of Homeric oral poetry, some scholars, such as Denys Page, argue that it represents a pre-Homeric recitation incorporated into the epic by Homer.

In the most recent extended study of the Catalogue, Edzard Visser concludes that the Catalogue is compatible with the rest of the Iliad in its techniques of verse improvisation, that the order of the names is meaningful and that the geographical epithets evince concrete geographical knowledge. Visser argues that this knowledge was transmitted by the heroic myth, elements of which introduce each geographical section. W. W. Minton places the catalogue within similar "enumerations" in Homer and Hesiod, and suggests that part of their purpose was to impress the audience with a display of the performer's memory.

The Catalogue was an important source for solving geopolitical matters. When the Athenians claimed Salamis they cited the Catalogue of Ships which listed it among the Athenian troops, as proof of its moral allegiance to Athens. Plutarch refers to a tradition according to which the Athenian politician Solon inserted the relevant lines into the Catalogue to support the Athenian claim to Salamis, which was disputed with Megara.

== Catalogue ==
In the Iliad, the Greek Catalogue lists twenty-nine contingents under 46 captains, accounting for a total of 1,186 ships. Using the Boeotian figure of 120 men per ship results in a total of 142,320 men transported to the Troad. They are named by various ethnonyms and had lived in 164 places described by toponyms. The majority of these places have been identified and were occupied in the Late Bronze Age. The terms Danaans, Argives and Achaeans or the sons of the Achaeans are used for the army as a whole. In his Library, Apollodorus lists thirty contingents under 43 leaders with a total of 1013 ships, Hyginus lists 1154 ships, although the total is given as only 245 ships.

Tabular Catalogue (Note: The Anglicised spellings and diacritical marks of the names in the table are as they are in Britannica, Great Books of the Western World, Volume 4. The order of contingents is that of the catalogue.)
Line	Ethnic identity	No. of ships	Captains (Note: The dramatic time of the catalogue is early in the war; the place, the shores of the Troad. Captains of those contingents outside the time and place of the catalogue are parenthesized; they are not in the catalogue.)	Settlements
2.494	Boeotians	50 of 120 men each	(First led by Thersander) Later led by Peneleōs, Leïtus, Arcesilaus, Prothoënor and Clonius	Hyria, Aulis, Schoenus, Scolus, Eteonus, Thespeia, Graia, Mycalessus, Harma, Eilesium, Erythrae, Eleon, Hyle, Peteon, Ocalea, Medeon, Copae, Eutresis, Thisbe, Coronea, Haliartus, Plataea, Glisas, Thebes, Onchestos, Arne, Midea, Nisa, (Note: Probably ancient Isos in the vicinity of modern Pyrgos, already in ruins by the time of Strabo) Anthedon
2.511	Minyans	30	Ascalaphus, Ialmenus	Aspledon, Orchomenus
2.517	Phocēans	40	Schedius, Epistrophus	Cyparissus, Pytho, Crisa, Daulis, Panopeus, Anemorea, Hyampolis, river Cephissus, Lilaea
2.527	Locrians	40	Ajax the Lesser	Kynos, Opoüs, Calliarus, Bessa, Scarphe, Augeae, Tarphe, Thronium
2.537	Abantes of Euboea	40	Elephenor	Chalcis, Eretria, Histiaea, Cerinthus, Dium, Carystus, Styra
2.546	Athenians	50	Led first by Menestheus (then later by Acamas and Demophon, the sons of Theseus)	Athens
2.557	Salamineans	12	Telamonian Ajax	Salamis
2.559	Argives	80	Diomedes with subordinates Sthenelus and Euryalus	Argos, Tiryns, Hermione, Asine, Troezen, Eiones, Epidaurus, Aegina, Mases
2.569	Mycenaeans	100	Agamemnon, king of Mycenae, supreme commander	Mycenae, Corinth, Cleonae, Orneae, Araethyrea, Sicyon, Hyperesia, Gonoessa, Pellene, Aegium, Helice
2.581	Lacedaemonians (or Laconians)	60	Menelaus, brother of Agamemnon, husband of Helen	Pharis, Sparta, Messe, Bryseae, Augeae, Amyclae, Helos, Laas, Oetylus
2.592	No name given (Messenians)	90	Nestor	Pylos, Arēne, Thryon, Aipy, Cyparisseis, Amphigenea, Pteleum, Helos, Dorium
2.603	Arcadians	60	Agapenor	Cyllene, Pheneus, Orchomenus, Rhipae, Stratie, Enispe, Tegea, Mantinea, Stymphalos, Parrhasia
2.615	Epeans of Elis	40	Amphimachus, Thalpius, Diōres, Polyxenus	Buprasium and the lands enclosed by Hyrmine, Myrsinus, Olene, Alesium
2.624	Men of Dulichium	40	Meges	Dulichium, Echinean Islands
2.631	Cephallenians	12	Odysseus (known in Latin as Ulysses)	Ithaca, Neritum, Crocylea, Aegilips, Same, Zacynthus (islands with mainland opposite) (Note: Compare to Book 1, verse 230 where Odysseus' kingdom includes Dulichium, Same, Zacynthus and Ithaca.)
2.638	Aetolians	40	Thoas	Pleuron, Olenus, Pylene, Chalcis, Calydon
2.645	Cretans	80	Idomeneus, Meriones	Knossos, Gortys, Lyktos, Miletus, Lycastus, Phaistos, Rhytium, others up to 100
2.653	Rhodians	9	Tlepolemus	Lindus, Ielysus, Cameirus
2.671	Symians	3	Nireus	Symi
2.676	No name given.	30	Pheidippus, Antiphus	Nisyrus, Crapathus, Casus, Cos, Calydnian Islands
2.681	Pelasgians, Myrmidons, Hellenes, Achaeans	50	Achilles (later led by Neoptolemus)	Pelasgic Argos, Alos, Alope, Trachis, Phthia
2.695	No name given.	40	Protesilaus (later led by Podarces)	Phylace, Pyrasus, Iton, Antrium, Pteleum
2.711	No name given.	11	Eumelus	Pherae, Boebe, Glaphyrae, Iolcus
2.716	No name given.	7, with 50 oarsmen each who were also archers	Philoctetes, later by Medon	Methone, Thaumacia, Meliboea, Olizon
2.729	No name given.	30	Podalirius, Machaon, two sons of Asclepius	Tricca, Ithome, Oechalia
2.734	No name given.	40	Eurypylus	Ormenius, Hypereia (fountain), Asterius, Titanus
2.738	(Lapiths)	40	Polypoetes, Leonteus	Argissa, Gyrtone, Orthe, Elone, Oloösson
2.748	Enienes, Peraebi	22	Guneus	Cyphus, Dodona, Gonnos, banks of the Titaresius
2.756	Magnetes	40	Prothoüs	About the Peneus and Mt. Pelion

== See also ==
- Trojan Battle Order
- Catalogue of Women by Hesiod
- Homeric scenes with proper names

== Literature ==
- Anderson, J.K. (1995). "The Geometric Catalogue of Ships". In Carter, Jane B.; Morris, Sarah P. (eds.). The Ages of Homer. Austin, TX: University of Texas Press. ISBN 9780292712089. OCLC 1145803250.
- Apollodorus; Hyginus (2007) [c. 100 BC; before AD 200]. Apollodorus' Library and Hyginus' Fabulae: Two Handbooks of Greek Mythology. Hackett Classics. Translated by Trzaskoma, Stephen M.; Smith, R. Scott. Hackett Publishing Company. OCLC 940867223(Note that for both works authorship and date of creation are contested.)
- Austin, John Norman Henry (1965). Catalogues and the Catalogue of Ships in the Iliad (Ph.D. thesis). University of California, Berkeley. OCLC 993700612. ProQuest 302174287.
- Autenrieth, Georg (1891) [1880]. A Homeric Dictionary for Schools and Colleges. New York: Harper and Brothers. OCLC 184883642.
- Bowra, Cecil Maurice (1963) [1930]. Tradition and Design in the Iliad (PDF). London: Clarendon Press. OCLC 310035.
- Bowra, Cecil Maurice (1933). "The Catalogue of the Ships". The Classical Review. 47 (5). Cambridge University Press: 174. doi:10.1017/S0009840X00062624. JSTOR 699431. S2CID 163022491.
- Crossett, John (March 1969). "The Art of Homer's Catalogue of Ships". The Classical Journal. 64 (6). Classical Association of the Middle West and South: 241–245. ISSN 0009-8353. JSTOR 3296106.
- Flacelière, Robert (1964). A Literary History of Greece. Chicago: Aldine.
- Homer (1924) [circa 800 BC]. Iliad. Loeb Classical Library. Translated by Murray, Augustus Taber. London, New York: W. Heinemann; G. P. Putnam's Sons. OCLC 38101377.
- Homer (1919) [circa 800 BC]. Odyssey. Loeb Classical Library. Translated by Murray, Augustus Taber). London, New York: W. Heinemann; G. P. Putnam's Sons. OCLC 685521.
- Jacoby, Felix (1932). "Homerisches II: Die Einschaltung des Schiffkatalogs in die Ilias" [Homerical II: The introduction of the Ships Catalogue into the Iliad]. Sitzungsberichte der Preussischen Akademie der Wissenschaften, Philosophisch-Historische Klasse (in German). 24. Berlin: Verlag der Akademie der Wissenschaften: 572–617. OCLC 176744621.
- Luce, John Victor (1975). Homer and the Heroic Age. New York: Harper & Row. ISBN 0060127228.
- Minton, William W. (1960). "Homer's Invocations of the Muses: Traditional Patterns". Transactions and Proceedings of the American Philological Association. 91: 292–309. doi:10.2307/283858. ISSN 0360-5949. JSTOR 283858.
- Page, Denys Lionel (1959). History and the Homeric Illiad. Sather classical lectures. Vol. 31. Berkeley, CA: University of California Press. doi:10.1525/9780520319813. ISBN 9780520319813.
- Reece, Steve (2009). Homer's Winged Words: The Evolution of Early Greek Epic Diction in the Light of Oral Theory. Mnemosyne, Supplements. Vol. 313. Leiden; Boston: Brill. pp. 172–180. ISBN 9789047427872.
- Visser, Edzard (1997). Homers Katalog der Schiffe [Homer's catalogue of ships] (in German). Stuttgart; Leipzig: Teubner. doi:10.1515/9783110958591. ISBN 978-3-598-77442-3.
