= Suitors of Helen =

Group in Greek mythology

In Greek mythology, the Suitors of Helen of Troy came from many kingdoms of Greece to compete for the hand of the Spartan princess Helen, daughter of Zeus and Leda.

== Mythology ==
=== Selection of the husband ===
When it was time for Helen of Troy to marry, many kings and princes from around the world came to seek her hand, bringing rich gifts with them, or sent emissaries to do so on their behalf. During the contest, Castor and Pollux had a prominent role in dealing with the suitors, although the final decision was in the hands of Tyndareus. Her future husband Menelaus did not attend but sent his brother Agamemnon to represent him. Menelaus was chosen because he had the most wealth and offered the most bride-gifts.

There are three available and not entirely consistent lists of suitors, compiled by Pseudo-Apollodorus (31 suitors), Hesiod (12 suitors), and Hyginus (36 suitors), for a total of 45 distinct names. There are only fragments from Hesiod's poem, so his list would have contained more. Achilles' absence from the lists is conspicuous, but Hesiod explains that he was too young to take part in the contest. Taken together, the list of suitors matches well with the captains in the Catalog of Ships from the Iliad; however, some of the names may have been placed in the list of Helen's suitors simply because they went to Troy. It is not unlikely that relatives of a suitor may have joined the war.

=== Name of suitors ===
List of Suitors of Helen
Name	Sources			Parentage	Abode
Name	Hesiod	Apollodorus	Hyginus	Parentage	Abode
Agapenor		✓	✓	son of Ancaeus	Arcadia
Ajax	✓	✓	✓	son of Telamon	Salamis
Ajax		✓	✓	son of Oileus	Locris
Alcmaeon	✓			son of Amphiaraus	Argos
Amphilochus	✓	✓		son of Amphiaraus	Argos
Amphimachus		✓	✓	son of Cteatus	Elis
Ancaeus			✓	son of Poseidon	Samos
Antilochus		✓	✓	son of Nestor	Pylos
Ascalaphus		✓	✓	son of Ares	Orchomenus
Blanirus			✓		
Clytius			✓		Cyane
Diomedes		✓	✓	son of Tydeus	Argos
Elephenor	✓	✓	✓	son of Chalcodon	Euboea
Epistrophus		✓		son of Iphitus	Phocis
Eumelus		✓	✓	son of Admetus	Pherae
Eurypylus		✓	✓	son of Euaemon	Ormenius
Ialmenus		✓		son of Ares	Orchomenus
Idomeneus	✓		✓	son of Deucalion	Crete
Leitus		✓		son of Alector	Boeotia
Leonteus		✓	✓	son of Coronus	Lapiths
Lycomedes	✓				Crete
Machaon		✓	✓	son of Asclepius	Tricca
Meges		✓	✓	son of Phyleus	Dulichium
Menelaus	✓	✓	✓	son of Atreus	Sparta
Menestheus	✓	✓	✓	son of Peteos	Athens
Meriones			✓	son of Molus	Crete
Nireus			✓	son of Charopus	Syme
Odysseus	✓	✓	✓	son of Laertes	Cephallenia (Ithaca)
Patroclus		✓	✓	son of Menoetius	Opus
Peneleos		✓	✓	son of Hippalcimus	Boeotia (Thebes)
Phemius			✓		
Phidippus			✓	son of Thessalus	Cos
Philoctetes	✓	✓	✓	son of Poeas	Meliboea
Podalirius		✓	✓	son of Asclepius	Tricca
Podarces	✓			son of Iphicles	Phylace
Polypoetes		✓	✓	son of Pirithous	Lapiths
Polyxenus		✓	✓	son of Agasthenes	Elis
Protesilaus	✓	✓	✓	son of Iphicles	Phylace
Prothous			✓	son of Tenthredon	Magnesia
Schedius		✓		son of Iphitus	Phocis
Sthenelus		✓	✓	son of Capaneus	Argos
Teucer		✓		son of Telamon	Salamis
Thalpius		✓	✓	son of Eurytus	Elis
Thoas			✓	son of Andraemon	Aetolia
Tlepolemus			✓	son of Heracles	Rhodes
Number	12	31	36		

=== Oath of Tyndareus ===
Tyndareus was afraid to select a husband for his daughter, or send any of the suitors away, for fear of offending them and giving grounds for a quarrel. Odysseus was one of the suitors, but had brought no gifts because he believed he had little chance to win the contest. He thus promised to solve the problem, if Tyndareus in turn would support him in his courting of Penelope, the daughter of Icarius. Tyndareus readily agreed, and Odysseus proposed that, before the decision was made, all the suitors should swear a most solemn oath to defend the chosen husband against whoever should quarrel with him. After the suitors had sworn not to retaliate, Menelaus was chosen to be Helen's husband.

== See also ==
- Achaean Leaders
- Marriage in ancient Greece

== Works cited ==
- Cingano, Ettore. "A Catalogue within a Catalogue: Helen’s Suitors in the Hesiodic Catalogue of Women (frr. 196–204)." In The Hesiodic Catalogue of Women: Constructions and Reconstructions (2005), p. 118-152.
- Clader, Linda Lee. Helen: the evolution from divine to heroic in Greek epic tradition. Leiden: Brill, 1976.
