= Schoenus (disambiguation) =

Schoenus is an ancient measure of distance.

Schoenus may refer to:

- Schoenus (Arcadia), a town of ancient Arcadia
- Schoenus (Boeotia), a town of ancient Boeotia
- Schoenus (Corinthia), a town of ancient Corinthia
- Schoenus (mythology), various figures in Greek mythology
- Schoenus (plant), a genus of sedges
