= Hoplite (disambiguation) =

The hoplites were Ancient Greek soldiers.

Hoplite or Hoplites may also refer to:

- Hoplites (river), a river in Ancient Greece
- Hoplites (ammonite), a genus of molluscs
- Hoplite (video game), a 2013 video game
- Operation Hoplite, a 2007 military operation
- Mil Mi-2 (NATO reporting name: Hoplite), a helicopter

== See also ==
- Hoplitis, a genus of bees
