= Isus (Boeotia) =

Town in ancient Boeotia

Coordinates: 38°28′42″N 23°23′23″E

Isus or Isos (Ancient Greek: Ἴσος) was a town in ancient Boeotia, near Anthedon, that in the time of Strabo had vestiges of a more ancient city, which some commentators identified with the Nisa referred to by Homer in the Catalogue of Ships in the Iliad.

Its site is located near modern Pirgos.
