= Eleon =

Town in ancient Boeotia

Coordinates: 38°21′20″N 23°28′47″E

Eleon (Ancient Greek: Ἐλεών), or Heleon (Ἑλεὼν), was a town in ancient Boeotia, mentioned by Homer in the Catalogue of Ships in the Iliad in the same line with Hyle and Peteon. It is said by Strabo to have been one of the smaller places in the territory of Tanagra, and to have derived its name from its marshy situation.

Its site is located near modern Arma (Dritsa).

Since 2007 there have been archaeological excavations on the site of ancient Eleon. The EBAP project (Eastern Boeotia Archaeological Project) focuses on the surveying, excavation, and academic articulation of the region from the Mycenaean Age through the Middle Ages. It is currently a joint collaboration between the Archaeological Museum in Thebes and the Canadian Institute in Greece. Spread out between the modern cities of Eleona and Tanagra, this team has uncovered, among others, the site of the Eleon Acropolis at Arma. Recent publications on the matter are included in the American Journal of Archaeology and The Fifth Archaeological Meeting on Thessaly and Central Greece, among others.
