= Michael Brough =

Michael Brough may refer to:

- Michael Brough (game designer) (born 1985), New Zealand video game developer
- Michael Brough (footballer) (born 1981), English footballer
