= Nisa (Boeotia) =

City in ancient Boeotia, mentioned by Homer

Nisa (Ancient Greek: Νίσα) was a city in ancient Boeotia, mentioned by Homer in the Catalogue of Ships in the Iliad, where the poet applies the epithet "divine" to the city.

Given the absence of written material in the more ancient authors about the location in Boeotia of Nisa, Strabo considered possible that the mention by Homer was an error and it was actually the city of Isus, although he cites a Nisa, which no longer existed, near Megara, whose inhabitants had emigrated to form a colony near the Mount Citheron, but in any case both populations were not in Boeotia. Other conjectures replaced the Nisa of the Homeric catalog by Creusa, Pharae or Nysa. The editors of the Barrington Atlas of the Greek and Roman World treat it as unlocated.
