= Elone =

Coordinates: 39°49′35″N 22°18′27″E

Elone (Ancient Greek: Ἠλώνη) was a town of Perrhaebia in ancient Thessaly. It is among the towns listed in the Catalogue of Ships in the Iliad by Homer along with Orthe and Oloosson. According to Strabo, the town was afterwards called Leimone (Λειμώνη). The same writer says that it was in ruins in his time, and that it lay at the foot of Mount Olympus, not far from the river Eurotas, which the poet calls Titaresius.

The site of Elone is identified with that of modern Argyropouli.
