= Same (Homer) =

Mythological island in Greece

Same (/ˈseɪmi/; Greek: Σάμη), also Samos (Σάμος), is an Ancient Greek name of a Homeric island in the Ionian Sea, near Ithaca and Cephalonia. In Homer's Odyssey Same is described as part of Odysseus's kingdom together with Ithaca, Dulichium, and Zacynthus. The Iliad, book II, in the Catalogue of Ships, contains a different list of islands comprising Odysseus's kingdom. Same is included together with Ithaca, Neritum, Krocylea, Aegilips and Zacynthus, indicating that the "Catalogue of Ships" could be a later addition to the Iliad.

In Homer's Odyssey, there is an interesting geographical description:

Now there is a rocky islet called Asteris, of no great size, in mid channel between Ithaca and Same, and there is a harbor on either side of it where a ship can lie, with an entrance on either side. Here then the Achaeans [the suitors] placed themselves in ambush [against Telemakhos].

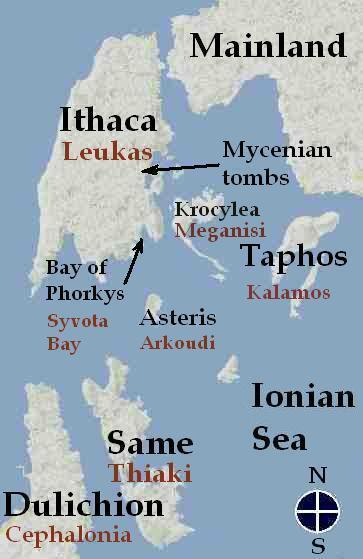
Map of Homer's Ithaca according to Dörpfeld's theory

From the above passage, Homer's Same is not the Greek island Samos in the Eastern Aegean Sea, Same should be in the Ionian Sea, near Homer's Ithaca and there should be at least one rocky island between the two islands. Also, this rocky island should be located South of Homer's Ithaca where Telemakhos would arrive from South-West Peloponnese. Based on the above information, Wilhelm Dörpfeld in his essay "Alt-Ithaka: Ein Beitrag zur Homer-Frage" proposed that Same was present day Ithaca.

Other authors make extensive description of Dörpfeld's theory. C.H. Goekoop relates Same to "Thiaki", "the islet Asteris" to Asteris, a small islet between Kefalonia and Ithaki, and "the bay of Phorkys" to "the bay of Asos" at Erissos, the northern peninsula of Kefalonia.

Odysseus's younger sister, Ctimene, came to Same to marry Eurylochus for a massive bride-price.

One of the suitors, Ctesippus of Same, is described as "a man who had no sense of right and wrong" and attempts to throw an ox's hoof from the meat-basket of the dinner table at Odysseus.
