= Eteonus =

Town of ancient Boeotia

Eteonus or Eteonos (Ancient Greek: Ἐτέωνος) was a town of ancient Boeotia, mentioned in the Catalogue of Ships in the Iliad by Homer, who gives it the epithet of πολύκνημος. It lay to the right of the Asopus. Strabo says that it was afterwards called Scarphe (Σκάρφη). It probably lay between Scolus and the frontier of the territory of Tanagra. Historically, another name for the town is Skaphaliai.

A tradition, collected by Lysimachus of Alexandria said that, when Oedipus died, the inhabitants of Thebes and of another Boeotian village called Ceus did not want his remains buried in their territories and his body was transported to Eteonus, where he was buried, at night, in an enclosure dedicated to Demeter. When the inhabitants of Eteonus learned of the fact, they consulted the oracle about what they should do and the answer was that the worshiper of the goddess should not be disturbed, so the remains were buried there. His grave, afterwards, was shown at Eteonus.

Its site has not been located.
