= Kopai =

Kopai may refer to:

- Kopai River, in India
- Kopai (Boeotia), a city of ancient Boeotia, Greece

== See also ==
- Kopais
