= Aega =

Aega may refer to:

- Aega (mythology), several mythological Greek characters
- Aega (mayor of the palace) (died 641), the name of a mayor of the palace of Neustria
- Aega (crustacean), a genus of isopod crustaceans
- Aega (Achaea), a town of ancient Achaea, Greece

== See also ==
- Aegan, a 2008 Kollywood film starring Ajith and Nayanthara
- Aegae (disambiguation)
