= Augeiae =

Augeiae or Augeiai (Ancient Greek: Αὐγειαί) may refer to:

- Augeiae (Laconia), a town of ancient Laconia, Greece
- Augeiae (Locris), a town of ancient Locris, Greece
