= Aegaeae =

Aegaeae or Aigaiai (Ancient Greek: Αἰγαῖαι) may refer to:

- Aigai (Aeolis), a town ancient of ancient Aeolis, now in Turkey
- Aegae (Cilicia), a town ancient of ancient Cilicia, now in Turkey
- Aegiae, a town of ancient Laconia, Greece

== See also ==
- Aegae (disambiguation)
