= Rhytium =

Coordinates: 35°00′38″N 25°10′12″E

Rhytium or Rhytion (Ancient Greek: Ῥύτιον), also called Rhytiassus or Rhytiassos, was a town of ancient Crete which Homer couples with Phaistos in the Catalogue of Ships in the Iliad as "well-peopled cities." The city belonged to the Gortynians. Earlier it was thought that the reading Rhythimne (Ῥυθίμνη) in the entry of Stephanus of Byzantium on Stelae should be emended into Rhytium (Ῥύτιον), but today it seems that Rhithymna or Rhittenia was meant.

The city continued to be independent until the Hellenistic period. According to Strabo, it then came under the rule of Gortyn and declined. Rhytion remained inhabited, although insignificant, until the Byzantine period, until, according to Claudius Aelianus, the citizens were forced to leave by an insect plague.

Its site is located near modern Rotasi.
