= Oloosson =

Town and polis of Perrhaebia, ancient Thessaly

Coordinates: 39°53′55″N 22°11′15″E

Map showing ancient Thessaly. Oloosson is shown to the upper centre.

Oloosson (Ancient Greek: Ὀλοοσσών) was a town and polis (city-state) of Perrhaebia in ancient Thessaly near Elone and Gonnus, mentioned in the Catalogue of Ships in the Iliad by Homer, who gives to it the epithet of “white,” from its white argillaceous soil. In Procopius the name occurs in the corrupt form of Lossonus.

Several Greek inscriptions have been found concerning the city of Oloosson. In a votive inscription from the first half of the fourth century BCE that is dedicated to Apollo Pythius are also the names of some people together with various demonyms from Perrhaebia. In another inscription dated in the 1st century BCE, election procedures of magistrates are mentioned.

Ancient Oloosson was located at a site called Panayia in the modern town of Elassona.
