= Brachyllas =

Ancient Greek general

Brachyllas (Ancient Greek: Βραχύλλας) or Brachylles (Ancient Greek: Βραχύλλης), son of Neon, was a Boeotian ally of the Macedonian king Antigonus Doson. Accordingly, when the latter took Sparta in 222 BC, he entrusted to Brachyllas the government of the city. After the death of Antigonus in 220 BC, Brachyllas continued to attach himself to the interests of Macedonia under Philip V, whom he attended in his conference with the Roman consul Flamininus at Nicaea (Locris) in 198 BC. At the battle of Cynoscephalae (197 BC) he commanded the Boeotian troops in Philip's army; but, together with the rest of his countrymen who had on that occasion fallen into Roman hands, he was sent home in safety by Flamininus, who wished thus to conciliate Boeotia. On his return he was elected Boeotarch through the influence of the Macedonian party at Thebes; in consequence of which Zeuxippus, Peisistratus, and the other leaders of the Roman party, caused him to be assassinated as he was returning home one night from an entertainment in 196 BC. Polybius records, and Livy omits to state, that Flamininus himself was privy to the crime.
