= Lophis (river) =

Mythical river near Haliartos in Greece

Lophis (Ancient Greek: Λοφίς) was a small stream of ancient Boeotia, near Haliartus, apparently the same as the Hopelites (Ὁπλίτης) of Plutarch, where Lysander fell in the Battle of Haliartus.
