= Phemius (mythology) =

Wikimedia disambiguation page

In Greek mythology, Phemius (/ˈfiːmiəs/; Ancient Greek: Φήμιος, romanized: Phḗmios, lit. 'speaker', 'voiced' or 'renowned') may refer to the following characters:

- Phemius, father of Aegeus, and accordingly the grandfather of Theseus, who is hence called Φημίου παῖς (Phēmiou pais).
- Phemius, son of Ampyx and founder of the town of Phemiae in Arnaea.
- Phemius, listed as one of the Suitors of Helen, otherwise unknown.
- Phemius, the virtuous minstrel in the court of Odysseus on Ithaca.
