= Milatus =

Coordinates: 35°18′25″N 25°34′28″E

Milatus or Milatos (Ancient Greek: Μίλατος), also known as Miletus or Miletos (Μίλητος), was a town on the north coast of ancient Crete. It is mentioned by Homer in the Catalogue of Ships of the Iliad. This town, which no longer existed in the time of Strabo, was looked upon by some writers as the mother-city of the Ionian colony Miletus.

The site of Milatus is tentatively located near a modern village also named Milatos.
