= Pteleum =

Ancient human settlement

Coordinates: 39°02′01″N 22°58′29″E

Pteleum or Pteleon (Ancient Greek: Πτελεόν), also Pteleos (Πτελεός), was a town of ancient Thessaly, on the south-western side of Phthiotis, and near the entrance of the Sinus Pagasaeus. It stood between Antron and Halos, and was distant from the latter 110 stadia, according to Artemidorus. It is mentioned by Homer in the Catalogue of Ships in the Iliad as governed by Protesilaus, to whom the neighbouring town of Antron also belonged.

In 200 BCE, during the Second Macedonian War, while the Romans and the forces of Attalus I besieged Oreus (on Euboea), Pteleum was attacked by part of Attalus' army. In 192 BCE, Antiochus III landed at Pteleum in order to carry on the war against the Romans in Greece. In 171 BCE, the town, having been deserted by its inhabitants, was destroyed by the consul Licinius. It seems never to have recovered from this destruction, as Pliny the Elder, writing in the first century, speaks of Pteleum only as a forest. Strabo relates that this city established a colony (also named Pteleum) in Elis. The form Pteleos is used by Lucan and Pomponius Mela.

Pteleum's location is at a site called Ftelio near Gritsa.

== See also ==
- List of ancient Greek cities
