= Medeon (Boeotia) =

City in Ancient Greece

Coordinates: 38°23′11″N 23°10′02″E

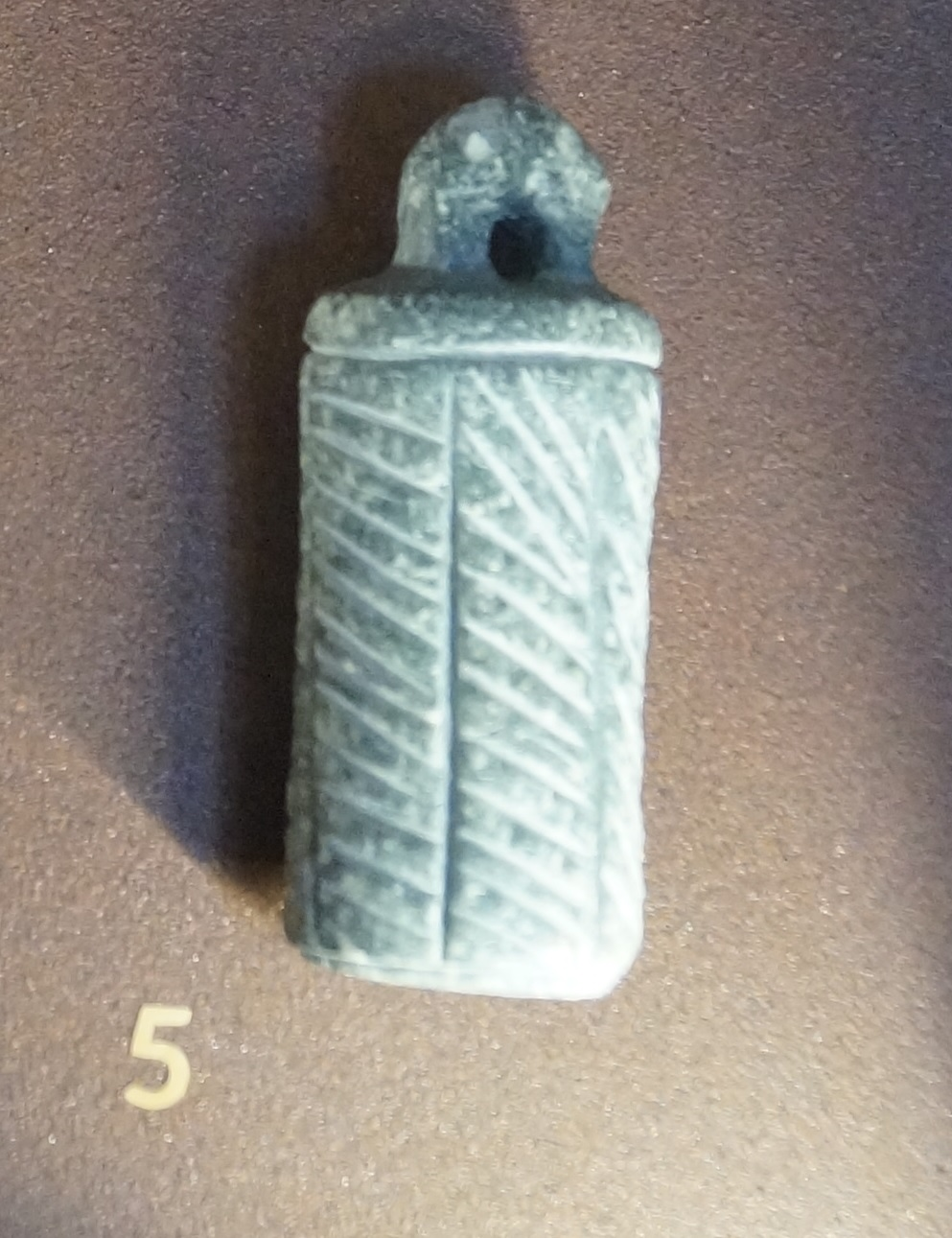
Cylindrical stone seal Medeon in Boeotia, dated to the Middle Helladic, c. 2000–1700 BCE

Medeon (Ancient Greek: Μεδεών) was a town of ancient Boeotia, mentioned by Homer in the Catalogue of Ships in the Iliad. Medeon is described by Strabo as a dependency of Haliartus, and situated near Onchestos, at the foot of Mount Phoenicium, from which position it was afterwards called Phoenicis.

The site of Medeon is located near modern Davlosi (Davlosis).
