= Lycastus (Crete) =

Ancient town in Crete

Coordinates: 35°12′08″N 25°06′14″E

Lycastus or Lykastos (Greek: Λύκαστος) was a town of ancient Crete, mentioned in the Catalogue of Ships in Homer's Iliad. Strabo says that it had entirely disappeared, having been conquered and destroyed by the Knossians. According to Polybius the Lycastian district was afterwards wrested from Knossos by the Gortynians, who gave it to the neighbouring town of Rhaucus.

Its site is located near modern Rokka.
