= Pteleum (Elis) =

Pteleum or Pteleon (Ancient Greek: Πτελεόν) was a town of Triphylia, in ancient Elis. Homer writes that it belonged to Nestor in the Catalogue of Ships in the Iliad. It is said by Strabo to have been a colony from the Thessalian Pteleum. This town had disappeared in Strabo's time (first century CE); but its uninhabited woody site was still called Pteleasimum or Pteleasion.

Its site has not been located.
