= Hoplite (video game) =

2013 mobile video game

- Developer: Douglas Cowley
- Artist: Shroomarts
- Platforms: iOS, Android
- Release: December 20, 2013
- Genre: Turn-based strategy game

Hoplite is an iOS and Android video game developed by Australian indie developer Douglas Cowley and released on December 20, 2013. Its artwork includes old-school pixel art done by Shroomarts.

== Gameplay ==
An in-game screenshot showing the hoplite at level 16.

The player assumes the role of a Greek hoplite who descends into the underworld, filled with various demonic enemies, on a quest to reclaim the Golden Fleece.

Gameplay is turn-based, on a hexagonally-tiled arena of fixed size. The protagonist starts the game armed with a sword, spear and shield, and must reach the exit represented by a tile depicting descending stairs in order to proceed to the next level, by either evading or killing the enemies on the level. The arena tiles consist of rock floor or lava pools, the latter which proves instantly fatal should the player accidentally end up in them.

The player can gain various abilities - such as being able to throw their spear further or reducing cooldowns for special abilities - by praying at altars found scattered throughout the ever more dangerous levels.

Enemies include footmen, archers, wizards and demolitionists (bomb-throwers), each with their own strengths and weaknesses. Most of the tactical gameplay involves exploiting these attributes while taking advantage of the player's own abilities.

The player starts each level with a fixed amount of stamina ("energy" in game parlance), a portion of which is consumed whenever the player performs a leap. Stamina may be regained either by moving next to an enemy, or by killing - if that ability has been unlocked.

Numerous ability upgrades ("gifts") may be unlocked, such as improved leaping or throwing distance, improvements to the use and power of the shield (known as bashing), or kill-counters which reset cooldowns or restore stamina, among others.

The game unlocks new gifts for new games by way of various achievements, such as retrieving the fleece without taking damage, or killing a certain number of demons within a certain turn limit.

Additionally, the registered version adds Challenge Mode, which is a practically infinite list of three-level dungeons with a random set of gifts assigned at the start.

== Reception ==
The game has a Metacritic rating of 88% based on 6 critic reviews. Touch Arcade said "It's very simple to learn, but there's a huge amount of depth to the game." Pocket Gamer UK said "An incredible, ever-changing blend of dungeon-crawling and tactical puzzles, Hoplite may lack a little longevity but it's impressively entertaining while it lasts." D+Pad Magazine wrote "Ultimately Hoplite is not a game based to any great extent about discovering new content or unlocking secrets; while some abilities are added to the roster for completing achievements, it does not have the complexity of hidden mechanics that its close comparator 868-HACK does. Instead it is, bluntly, the more “accessible” game and perhaps as a result the truer evocation of retro gaming. Its rules can be learned very quickly, as any good short-playing game should, and yet it still has elements of deep strategy, choice and randomisation to provide a motivation for chasing high scores." Gameblog.fr wrote "Hoplite is a procedural tactical game that will require patience, concentration and planning. The ideal indie game to chain-die in the bus, the subway or on the beach." GradItMagazine said "Hoplite proudly flies its roguelike colours. Permadeath, turn-based combat and punishing difficulty await those game enough to plunder the dungeons’ depths in search of the Golden Fleece. The punishing, and often frustrating, difficulty of Hoplite is balanced by short, quick levels and an addictiveness that only comes from a desire to not let the game get the best of you." Multiplayer.it wrote "Hoplite is the perfect example of how you can create a roguelike in a bunch of days and get the job done."
