= Arne (Thessaly) =

Ancient city of Thessaly

Arne (Ancient Greek: Ἄρνη) was the chief city of the Aeolian Boeotians in ancient Thessaly, which was said to have derived its name from the mythological Arne, a daughter of Aeolus. The town was said to have been founded three generations before the Trojan War. According to Thucydides the Aeolian Boeotians were expelled from Arne by the Thessalians sixty years after the Trojan war, and settled in the country called Boeotia after them; but other writers, inverting the order of events, represent the Thessalian Arne as founded by Boeotians, who had been expelled from their country by the Pelasgians. Stephanus of Byzantium wrote that later Cierium occupied the site of Arne, which was accepted at least by William Smith, writing in the 19th century, and by the editors of the Barrington Atlas of the Greek and Roman World; others place Arne at a site nearby, but not at, Cierium. If Arne is Cierium, it is located at Pyrgos Kieriou (Πύργος Κιερίου), in the municipal unit of Arni, municipality of Sofades, periphery of Karditsa, Thessaly. Lund University's Digital Atlas of the Roman Empire, places Arne at Magoula Makria.
