= Eilesium =

Town of ancient Boeotia

Coordinates: 38°18′08″N 23°30′15″E

Eilesium or Eilesion (Ancient Greek: Εἰλέσιον) was a town of ancient Boeotia. It is mentioned by Homer in the Catalogue of Ships in the Iliad. Strabo says that its name indicates a marshy position.

Its site is located near modern Asopia/Khlembotsari.
