= Helos (Elis) =

Helos (Ancient Greek: Ἕλος, meaning "marshland" or "swamp") was a town of ancient Elis. According to Homer, in the Catalogue of Ships in the Iliad, it belonged to Nestor. It was placed by some ancient critics on the Alpheius, and by others on the Alorian marsh, where was a sanctuary dedicated by the Arcadians to Artemis.
