= Mideia (Boeotia) =

Mideia (Ancient Greek: Μίδεια) was a city of ancient Boeotia mentioned by Homer in the Catalogue of Ships in the Iliad. Pausanias relates that Mideia occupied the height adjacent to the later town of Lebadeia, and its inhabitants, under the conduct of Lebadus, an Athenian, migrated into the plain, and founded there the city named after him. On the other hand, Strabo maintains that the Homeric cities Arne and Mideia were both swallowed up by Lake Copais.
