= Alesiaeum =

Town of Pisatis in ancient Elis

Alesiaeum or Alesiaion (Ancient Greek: Ἀλεσιαῖον), also called Aleisium or Aleision (Ἀλείσιον) by Homer and Alesium or Alesion (Ἀλήσιον) by Stephanus of Byzantium, was a town of Pisatis in ancient Elis, situated upon the road leading across the mountains from Elis to Olympia. It appears in the Catalogue of Ships in Homer's Iliad.

Its site is unlocated.
