= Nysa (Boeotia) =

Nysa (Ancient Greek: Νῦσα), or Nysae or Nysai (Νῦσαι), was a village in ancient Boeotia on Mount Helicon.
