= Schoenus (Arcadia) =

Schoenus or Schoinous (Ancient Greek: Σχοινοῦς) was a town in the centre of ancient Arcadia near Methydrium. It was said to have derived its name from the Boeotian Shoenus.

Its site is unlocated.
