= Cerinthus (Euboea) =

Coordinates: 38°50′03″N 23°28′39″E

Cerinthus or Kerinthos (Ancient Greek: Κήρινθος) was a town upon the northeastern coast of ancient Euboea, and near the small river Budorus, said to have been founded by the Athenian Cothus. It is mentioned by Homer in the Catalogue of Ships in the Iliad. Verses attributed to Theognis suggest the town was destroyed in the mid-6th century BC, either by the Kypselidai of Corinth or more likely the Athenian Miltiades. If indeed it was destroyed, it must have been rebuilt because it was still extant in the time of Strabo, who speaks of it as a small place.

Its site is located near the modern village of Kria Vrisi, Ag. Ilias.
