= Gonoessa =

Map of Ancient Achaea (with its place names in Greek)

Gonoessa (Ancient Greek: Γονόεσσα), also known as Gonussa or Gonoussa (Γονοῦσσα), was a city in ancient Achaea, Greece. The location of the city has not been found, but it is assumed to lie in the northwesternmost part of present Corinthia.

"High Gonoessa" was mentioned by Homer in the Catalogue of Ships in the Iliad. It was a settlement of the city-state of Pellene with a port from which a fleet under the command of Agamemnon departed during the Trojan War. Homer said that the combined fleet with Pellene and Hyperesia totaled 100 ships. It has been suggested that the town was founded by the Pelasgians, the proto-Greek that arrived from Asia Minor and settled the whole Achaea. According to Pausanias, its proper name was Donussa or Donoussa (Δονοῦσσα), which was changed by Peisistratus into Gonoëssa, when he collected the poems of Homer. Pausanias says that it was a fortress belonging to the Sicyonians, and lay between Aegeira and Pellene; but from its position we may infer that it was at one time dependent upon Pellene.
