= Schoenus (Corinthia) =

Coordinates: 37°55′09″N 23°00′23″E

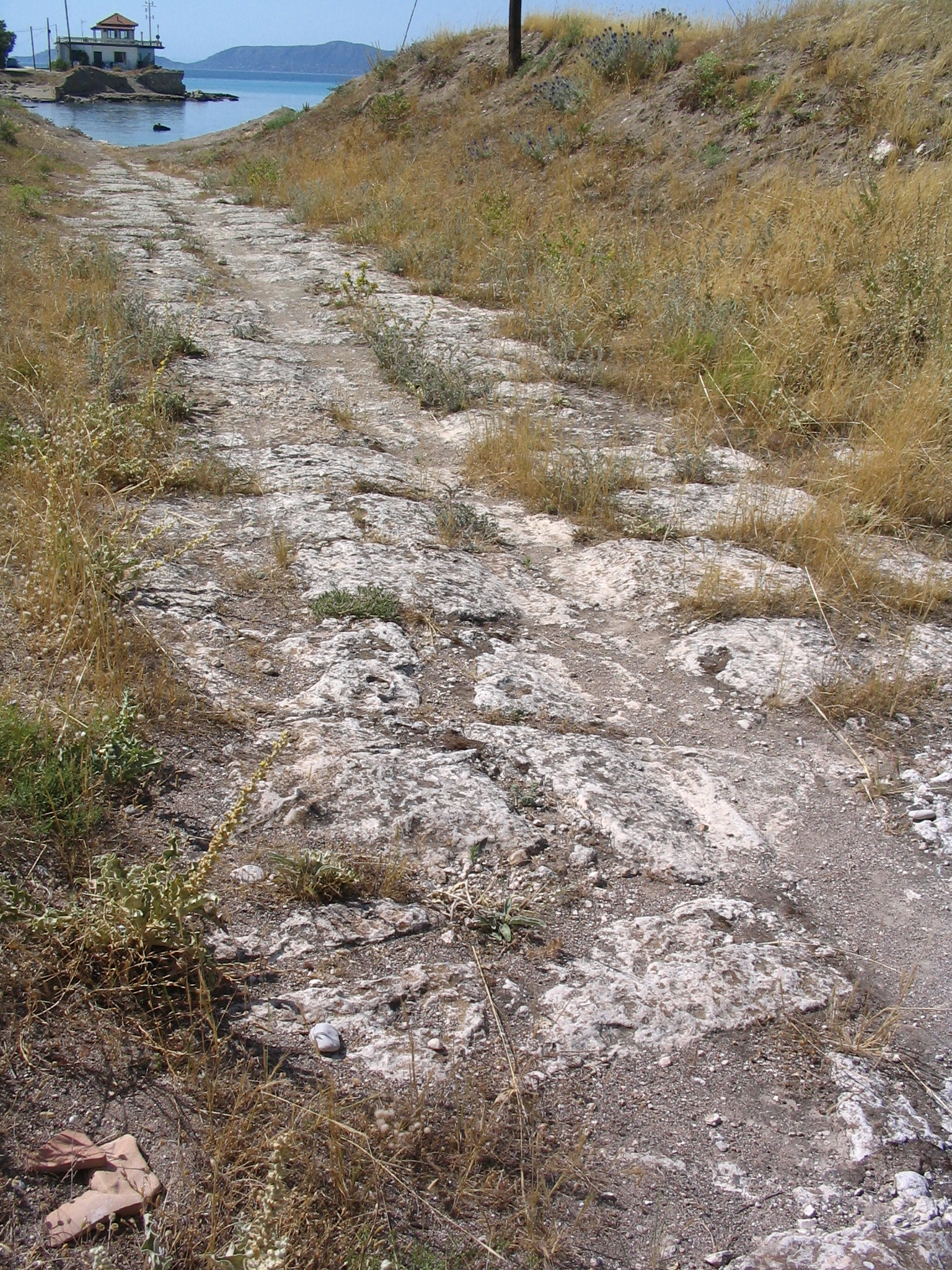
Remains of a causeway where goods-laden boats were transported by diolcos between Poseidonia and Schoenus.

Schoenus or Schoinous (Ancient Greek: Σχοινοῦς) was a port-town on the Saronic Gulf in ancient Corinthia. It was located on the Corinthian Isthmus, and was the only town on the Isthmus in ancient times. Situated at the narrowest part of the Isthmus, it was the port of the Isthmian sanctuary, and the place at which goods, not intended for the Corinthian market, were transported across the Isthmus by means of the Diolcos. Schoenus is located at a site in the modern village of Kalamaki. The harbour is exposed to the east and south-east: the site of the town is indicated by a few fragments of Doric columns. The Isthmian sanctuary lies rather less than a mile (1.6 km) southeast of Schoenus. Pomponius Mela refers to the town as Portus Schoenitas.
