= Parrhasia (city) =

Ancient Greek city in Arcadia

Parrhasia (Ancient Greek: Παρρασία) was a city of ancient Arcadia, in the region of Parrhasia. It was mentioned by Homer in the Catalogue of Ships in the Iliad. It was said to have been founded by Parrhasus, a son of Lycaon, or by Pelasgus, son of Arestor. Some writers equate the city with Lycosura.
