= Aegae =

Aegae or Aigai may refer to:

- Aegae (Macedonia), the original capital of the kingdom of Macedon, located near present Vergina, Greece
- Aegae (Euboea), an ancient town in Euboea, near which a sanctuary of Aegean Poseidon was built upon a hill
- Aegae (Achaea), an ancient settlement in Achaea, near present Aigeira
- Aegae (Aeolis), an ancient city and former bishopric of the Aeolian dodecapolis in Asia Prima, now Nemrutkale or Nemrut Kalesi near the modern city Aliağa and a Latin Catholic titular
- Aegae (Cilicia), an ancient town in Cilicia, near modern Yumurtalık

== See also ==
- Aegaeae (disambiguation)
- Aigiai, an ancient town in Laconia
- Aege, an ancient town in Pallene, Chalkidiki
