= Helos =

Town of ancient Laconia

Coordinates: 36°50′36″N 22°36′27″E

Helos (Ancient Greek: τὸ Ἕλος, meaning "marshland" or "swamp"), also Hele (Ἕλη), was a town of ancient Laconia, situated east of the mouth of the Eurotas, close to the sea, in a plain which, though marshy near the coast, is described by Polybius as the most fertile part of Laconia. In the earliest times it appears to have been the chief town on the coast, as Amyclae was in the interior; for these two places are mentioned together by Homer in the Catalogue of Ships in the Iliad. Helos is said to have been founded by Helios, the youngest son of Perseus. On its conquest by the Dorians its inhabitants were reduced to slavery; and, according to a common opinion in antiquity, their name became the general designation of the Spartan bondsmen, helots, but the name of these slaves (εἵλωτες) probably signified captives, and was derived from the root of ἑλεῖν. In the time of Strabo Helos was only a village; and when it was visited by Pausanias, it was in ruins. Helos is also mentioned by Thucydides, Xenophon, and Stephanus of Byzantium.

It is tentatively located at a site called Agios Stephanos, in the modern community of Elos.
