= Aegiae =

Town of ancient Laconia

Coordinates: 36°47′11″N 22°30′46″E

Aegiae or Aigiai (Ancient Greek: Αἰγίαι) or Aegaeae or Aigaiai (Αἱγαῖαι) was a town of ancient Laconia, at the distance of 30 stadia from Gythium, supposed by Strabo to be the same as the Homeric Augeiae It possessed a temple and lake of Poseidon.

== See also ==
- Aigai, Macedonia
- Aigai (disambiguation)
