= Eion (Argolis) =

Coordinates: 37°31′14″N 22°51′27″E

Eion (Ancient Greek: Ἠιών) or Eiones (Ἠιόνες) was a town of ancient Argolis, on the Argolic peninsula, mentioned by Homer in the Catalogue of Ships in the Iliad, along with Troezen and Epidaurus. It is said to have been one of the towns founded by the Dryopes, when they were expelled from their seats in Northern Greece by Heracles. Strabo relates that the Mycenaeans expelled the inhabitants of Eion, and made it their sea-port, but that it had entirely disappeared in his time.

Its site is tentatively located near modern Tolo.
