= Peteon =

Coordinates: 38°26′38″N 23°24′44″E

Peteon (Ancient Greek: Πετεών) was a town of ancient Boeotia, mentioned by Homer in the Catalogue of Ships in the Iliad. It was situated near the road from Thebes to Anthedon. Strabo contradicts himself in one passage placing Peteon in the Thebais, and in another in the Haliartia.

Its site is located near modern Platanaki.
