= Stratia =

City in ancient Arcadia

Stratia or Stratie (Ancient Greek: Στρατίη) was a city in ancient Arcadia. It was mentioned by Homer in the Catalogue of Ships of the Iliad as one of the Arcadian cities that participated in the Trojan War, led by general Agapenor. Even in antiquity its location was unknown. The ancient belief that it was situated on an island in the river Ladon was dismissed by Pausanias.
