= Bessa (Locris) =

Town in ancient Locris

Bessa (Ancient Greek: Βῆσσα) was a town in ancient Locris, so called from its situation in a wooded glen. It is mentioned by Homer, in the Catalogue of Ships in the Iliad. It had disappeared in the time of Strabo.

Its site is unlocated.
