= Diomedeia =

Topics referred to by the same term

In Greek mythology Diomedeia (Ancient Greek: Διομήδεια) is a name that may refer to:

Persons:

- Diomedeia, same as Diomede
- Diomedeia, possible mother of Protesilaus and possibly Podarces by Iphiclus.

Place:

- Diomedeia is also the name of a city in Daunia.
