= Anemoreia =

Anemoreia (Ancient Greek: Ἀνεμώρεια), subsequently Anemoleia (Ἀνεμώλεια), was a town of ancient Phocis mentioned by Homer in the Catalogue of Ships in the Iliad. It was situated on a height on the borders of Phocis and Delphi, and is said to have derived its name from the gusts of wind which blew on the place from the tops of Mount Parnassus.

Its territory had served as a border between Phocis and Delphi around 457 BCE when the Delphines, incited by the Lacedemonians, decided to separate from the Phocians and form their own state.

Its exact location is not known with certainty, but it has been suggested that it could have been located in the area of the modern town of Arakhova. More recent field research by the Southern Phokis Regional Project suggests that the Late Mycenaean archaeological site of Desfina-Kastrouli, 4km east of the modern town of Desfina, should be equated with Anemoreia.
