= Hyle (Boeotia) =

Town in ancient Boeotia

Coordinates: 38°27′32″N 23°19′03″E

Hyle (Ancient Greek: Ὕλη) was a town in ancient Boeotia, situated upon Lake Hylica, which derived its name from this place. It is mentioned by Homer in the Catalogue of Ships, and elsewhere, in the Iliad.

The toponym of Hyle, written in Linear B script, appears in one of the clay tablets recovered in 1995 at Thebes.

Its site is located near modern Oungra.
