= Haliartus =

Town of ancient Boeotia, Greece

Coordinates: 38°22′47″N 23°05′18″E

Haliartus or Haliartos (Ancient Greek: Ἁλίαρτος), also known as Ariartus, Ariartos, Hariartus, or Hariartos (Ἀρίαρτος or Ἁρίαρτος), was a town of ancient Boeotia, and one of the cities of the Boeotian League. It was situated on the southern side of Lake Copais in a pass between the mountain and the lake. It is mentioned in the Catalogue of Ships in the Iliad by Homer, who gives it the epithet ποιήεις (grassy) in consequence of its well-watered meadows. According to tradition it was founded by Haliartus, a son of Thersander, and grandson of Sisyphus.

During the Second Persian invasion of Greece, it was destroyed by the Persians (480 BC), but afterwards the citizens rebuilt it. In the Peloponnesian War appears as one of the chief cities of Boeotia. It is chiefly memorable in history on account of the Battle of Haliartus fought under its walls between Lysander and the Thebans, in which the former was slain, 395 BCE. In 171 BCE Haliartus was destroyed a second time. Having espoused the cause of Perseus of Macedon, it was taken by the Roman praetor Lucretius, who sold the inhabitants as slaves, carried off its statues, paintings, and other works of art, and razed it to the ground. Its territory was afterwards given to the Athenians, and it never recovered its former prosperity. Strabo speaks of it as no longer in existence in his time, and Pausanias, in his account of the place, mentions only a heroum of Lysander, and some ruined temples which had been burnt by the Persians and had been purposely left in that state.

The Haliartia (Ἁλιαρτία), or territory of Haliartus, was a very fertile plain, watered by numerous streams flowing into Lake Copais, which in this part was hence called the Haliartian marsh. These streams bore the names of Ocalea, Lophis, Hoplites, Permessus, and Olmeius. The territory of Haliartus extended westward to Mount Tilphossium, since Pausanias says that the Haliartians had a sanctuary of the goddesses called Praxidicae situated near this mountain. The towns Peteon, Medeon, Ocalea, and Onchestos were situated in the territory of Haliartus.

Its site is located at the Kastri Maziou near modern Aliartos (formerly named Moulki, but renamed after the ancient town). The remains of Haliartus are situated upon a hill about a mile (1.6 km) from the village of Mazi, on the road from Thebes to Lebadeia, and at the distance of about 15 miles (24 km) from either place. The hill of Haliartus is not more than 50 feet (15 m) above the lake. It was visited in the 19th century by William Martin Leake who says, "that towards the lake the hill of Haliartus terminates in rocky cliffs, but on the other sides has a gradual acclivity. Some remains of the walls of the Acropolis, chiefly of polygonal masonry, are found on the summit of the hill; and there are several sepulchral crypts in the cliffs, below which, to the north, issues a copious source of water, flowing to the marsh, like all the other streams near the site of Haliartus. Although the walls of the exterior town are scarcely anywhere traceable, its extent is naturally marked to the east and west by two small rivers, of which that to the west issues from the foot of the hill of Mazi; the eastern, called the Kefalári, has its origin in Mount Helicon. Near the left bank of this stream, at a distance of 500 yards (480 m) from the Acropolis, are a ruined mosque and two ruined churches, on the site of a village which, though long since abandoned, is shown by these remains to have been once inhabited by both Greeks and Turks. Here are many fragments of architecture and of inscribed stones, collected formerly from the ruins of Haliartus. From this spot there is a distance of about three-quarters of a mile (1.2 km) to a tumulus westward of the Acropolis, where are several sarcophagi and ancient foundations near some sources of waters, marking probably the site. of the western entrance of the city."

The stream which flowed on the western side of the city is the one called Hoplites by Plutarch, where Lysander fell, and is apparently the same as the Lophis of Pausanias. The stream on the eastern side, called Kefalári, is formed by the union of two rivulets, which appear to be the Permessus and Olmeius, which are described by Strabo as flowing from Helicon, and after their union entering Lake Copais near Haliartus. The tumulus, of which Leake speaks, perhaps covers those who were killed along with Lysander, since it was near this spot that the battle was fought.
