= Stelae (Crete) =

Stelae or Stelai (Ancient Greek: Στῆλαι) was a town of ancient Crete. Stephanus of Byzantium describes Stelae as being near two towns, which are called, in the published editions of his work, Paraesus and Rhithymne.

In the 19th century map of Crete by Robert Pashley, its site is fixed at the village of Filippi on the route from Inatus to Gortyna. However, modern scholars treat it as unlocated.
