= Dium (Euboea) =

Coordinates: 38°51′03″N 22°52′23″E

Dium or Dion (Ancient Greek: Δῖον or Δίων or Δίον) was a town in the northwest of ancient Euboea near the promontory Cenaeum, from which Canae in Aeolis is said to have been a colony. Dium is mentioned by Homer, as under the leadership of Elephenor, in the Catalogue of Ships in the Iliad.

Dium is tentatively identified with the site of Likhas Kastri.
