= Enispe =

Enispe or Enispa (Ancient Greek: Ἐνίσπη) was a city in ancient Arcadia. It was mentioned by Homer in the Catalogue of Ships of the Iliad as one of the Arcadian cities that participated in the Trojan War, led by general Agapenor. Even in antiquity its location was unknown. The ancient belief that it was situated on an island in the river Ladon was dismissed by Pausanias.

The location of the ancient city is still unknown, but some archaeologists believe it was situated at the locality Sakovouni near Vytina, where a prehistoric settlement has been excavated.
