= Michael Brough (game designer) =

New Zealand-born game designer

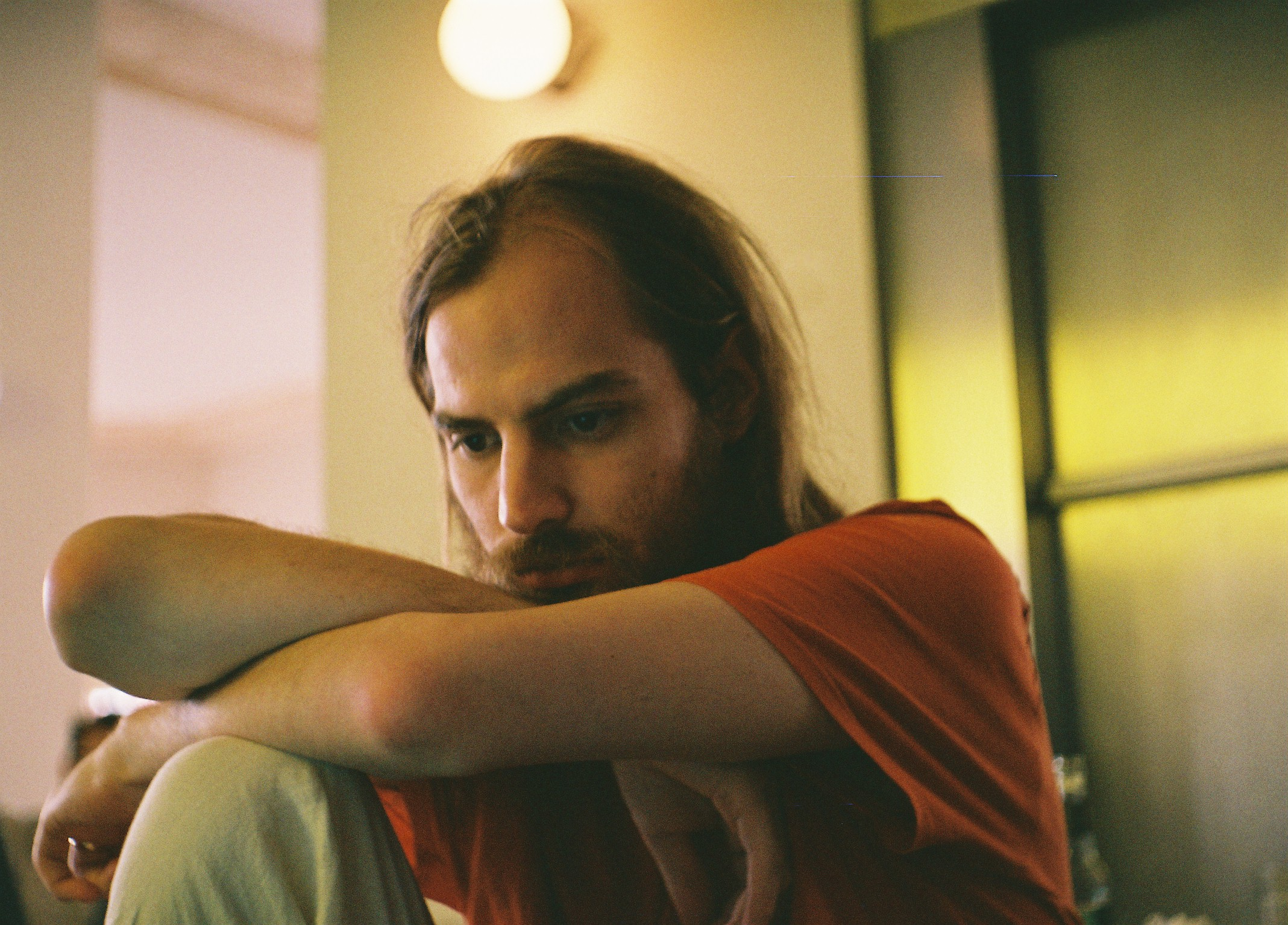
- Michael Brough at Berlin Indie Game Jam in 2011
- Born: 20 May 1985 (age 41); Auckland, New Zealand
- Occupation: Game designer
- Website: www.smestorp.com

Michael Brough (born 20 May 1985) is a New Zealand-born indie video game developer known for roguelike games. His games are often tightly focused explorations of a single mechanical aspect of the roguelike genre, set on unusually small grids. This style of game, perhaps best exemplified by 868-HACK, has become widely known as the "Broughlike".

Wired Magazine called Brough's games "corrupted" and "brilliant", while The Guardian wrote that his work is "strange" and "elegant".

Michael Brough graduated from The University of Auckland with a MS Degree in Mathematics under the supervision of Bakhadyr Khoussainov.

== Design philosophy ==
Brough believes that games are best understood within genres, which led him to focus on the roguelike game genre. He cites the early roguelike Castle of the Winds as an early inspiration. One design problem with the original Rogue and subsequent roguelikes, Brough argues, is a large game board (80x20 tiles in Rogue) which leads to the player running down long corridors and "not making choices". In comparison, classic board games like Chess and Go use 8x8 and 19x19 board sizes. "You should never need a larger possibility space than Go," says Brough. For one of his first roguelike games, Zaga-33, Brough specifically limited the board size to 9x9. 868-HACK, Imbroglio, and Cinco Paus took this trend even further, with 6x6, 4x4, and 5x5 boards respectively.

Brough also identifies another design problem in roguelikes which he likens to Zugzwang in Chess, when the game forces you to move into a bad situation. Most roguelikes implement a "Wait" command to let the player pass their turn, forcing monsters to move into a bad position instead; however, Brough argues this is a poor solution, and thus he tries to avoid implementing wait actions in his games. "Attacking is already a form of waiting" since combatants stay in the same positions before and after the attack, which means enemies are already "resources for waiting". To try to innovate on this Zugzwang problem, 868-HACK lets the player use ranged attacks, as well as consume resources to use a ".WAIT" ability if they have acquired it.

== Award nominations ==
His games Vesper.5, Corrypt, and BECOME A GREAT ARTIST IN JUST 10 SECONDS were finalists for the IGF's Nuovo Award in 2013, 2014, and 2015 respectively, and 868-HACK and Imbroglio were finalists for the Excellence in Design award in 2014 and 2017.

== Ludography ==
- 868-BACK (2026)
- P1 Select (2019)
- Cinco Paus (2017)
- Imbroglio (2016)
- Helix (2014)
- 868-HACK (2013)
- Become a Great Artist in Just 10 Seconds (2013)
- Corrypt (2012)
- Vesper.5 (2012)
- Zaga-33 (2012)
- Glitch Tank (2011)
- Vertex Dispenser (2011)
