= 868-HACK =

2013 video game

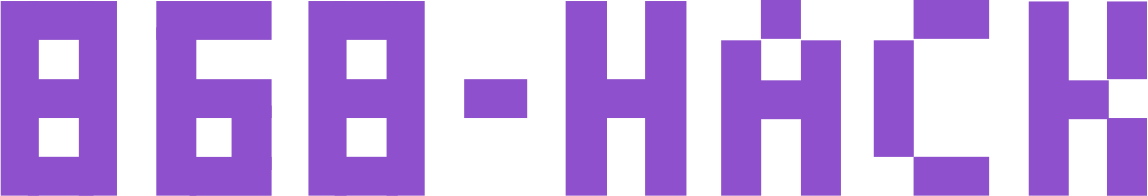
- Developer: Michael Brough
- Publisher: Michael Brough
- Platforms: iOS; Windows; Mac OS X
- Release: iOS; 30 August 2013; Windows, Mac OS X; 27 January 2015
- Genre: Roguelike
- Mode: Single-player

868-HACK is a 2013 roguelike video game developed and published by Michael Brough. The player controls a hacking program in a computer system and must grab as much computer data as possible before a defence program destroys it.

Development of the game began in March 2013, as part of the "Seven-Day Roguelike" competition. It was released in August 2013 for iOS and in January 2015 for Microsoft Windows and Mac OS X. The "PLAN.B" expansion pack was released in July 2017.

868-HACK received mostly positive reviews from critics. The game was nominated for an Excellence in Design award at the Independent Games Festival, receiving an honorable mention for the Seumas McNally Grand Prize there. 868-HACK was ranked 42nd on Polygon's list of "The 100 best games of the decade (2010–2019)" and 29th on Paste's list of "The 50 Best Mobile Games of the 2010s".

== Gameplay ==
In a top-down view, the player must grab as much computer data as possible.

The player controls a hacking program in a computer system and must grab as much computer data as possible before a defence program destroys it. The game plays in the manner of a dungeon crawler, with rooms being randomly generated. The player must collect keys to unlock nodes to hack. The game's graphics resemble those of early 80s home computers.

The game takes place in a cyberpunk setting, where, as alluded to by the game's title, hacking is done by dial-up. The player is a "smiley face" which can be moved around an 6×6 grid. The grid is shaped by "circuit-board-looking walls". The enemies in 868-HACK look vaguely like those in Pac-Man. Players can fire lasers at these enemies. Most of the enemies have two health bars, and they each have one of four different special abilities; being able to move on top of wall tiles, being able to move over two tiles at a time, having three health bars instead of two, or being invisible when not in the same row or column as the player. Each wall tile in the game stores a reward which can be extracted, but also has a number signifying how many enemies it will spawn when opened.

== Development and release ==
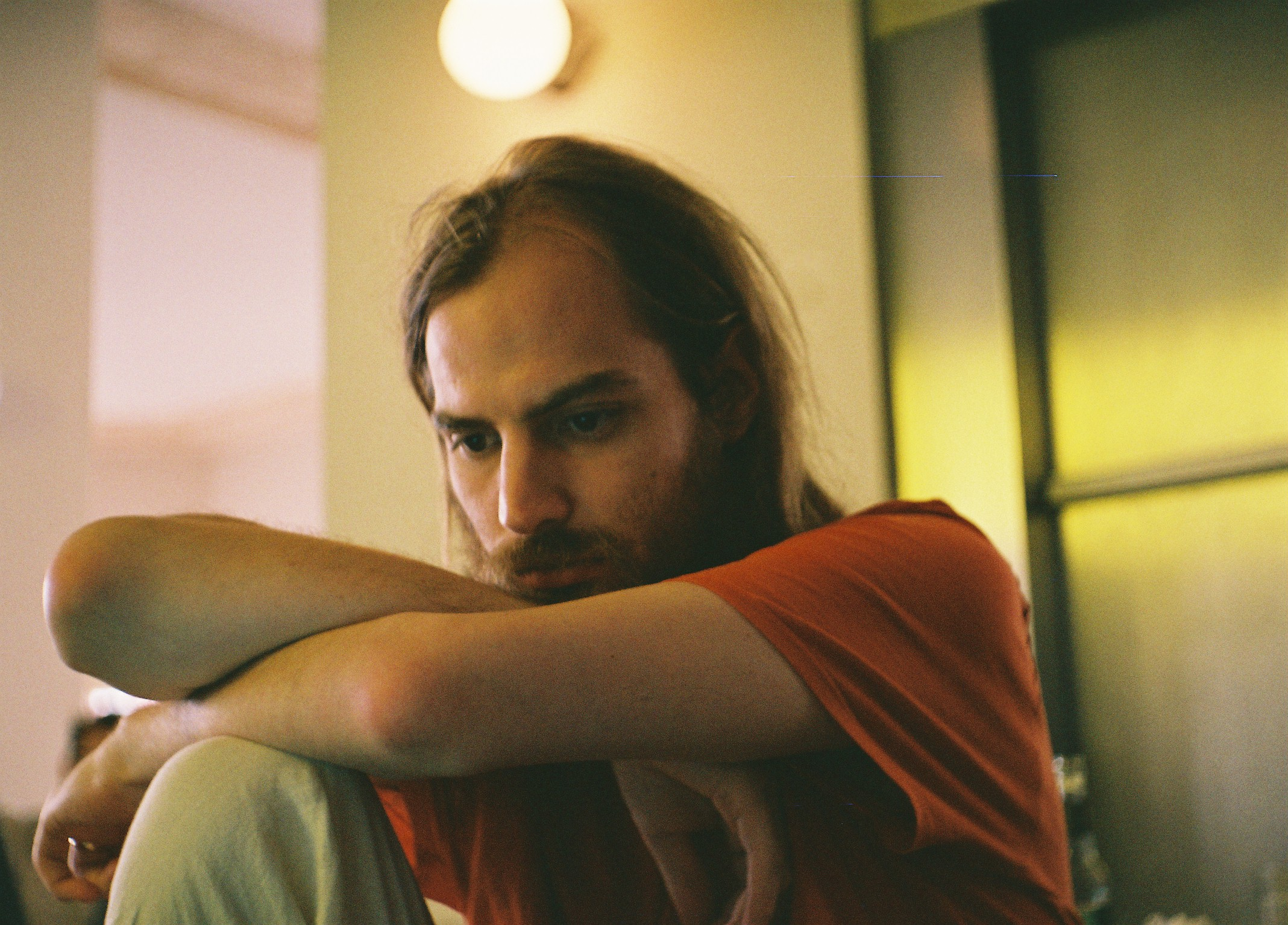
Developer Michael Brough

In March 2013, developer Michael Brough started to work on 868-HACK as part of a seven-day Roguelike competition. The game was originally called "86856527" at the event. Brough worked on the game for six months, then spent four months fixing bugs, tuning balance, and porting. Michael Brough recorded the sounds of the game; Leigh Alexander of Gamasutra said the sound "gives its forbidding machinery a fascinating human sound".

868-HACK was released for iOS on 30 August 2013, and for Windows and Mac OS X on 27 January 2015. An estimated 14,000 copies of 868-HACK were sold for iOS. On 23 July 2017, an expansion pack of the game was released, called "868-HACK – PLAN.B". The expansion added a "new mode, new progs, and new power-ups".

Fours months after its initial release, on 17 December 2013, the game was chosen as "Mobile Game of the Week" by American magazine Paste. Aevee Bee, writing for Paste for this review, described the game as "a turn based trainwreck—a meticulously ordered, predictably random and nearly always solvable trainwreck of exploding and overwhelming complexity". In November 2019, 868-HACK was ranked 42 on American video game website Polygon's list of "The 100 best games of the decade (2010–2019)". It was also ranked at 29 on Paste's list of "The 50 Best Mobile Games of the 2010s".

== Reception ==
Reception

Aggregate score
Aggregator	Score
Metacritic	(iOS) 84/100

Review scores
Publication	Score
Pocket Gamer	4/5
TouchArcade	5/5

868-HACK received generally favorable reviews from critics, according to review aggregator Metacritic.

Will Freeman of The Guardian praised the game for captivating players by "imposing limitations" and having every move in a game be "challenging"; he further praised the game by saying that it is "visually eccentric and a great deal more refined and considered than it first appears". Harry Slater of Pocket Gamer called the game an "intriguing" but "unashamedly tough experience" that offered a "unique and engaging take on some of modern gaming's current trends". The game received Pocket Gamer's silver award. Edge Online called the game "formidably tough" and "meticulously thought through", saying it was "one of the smartest iOS games in some time". Chris Person of Kotaku found the game to be "incredibly addictive". Writing for The Verge, Andrew Webster praised 868-HACK for being a "relatively quick game" and the "perfect fit for your iPhone".

=== Accolades ===
868-HACK received nominations for Excellence in Design and the Seumas McNally Grand Prize at the 2014 Independent Games Festival, getting an honorable mention for the latter.

Year	Award	Category	Result	Ref(s).
2014	Independent Games Festival	Excellence in Design	Nominated	
2014	Independent Games Festival	Seumas McNally Grand Prize	Honorable mention	
