= Scolus (Boeotia) =

Ancient human settlement in Greece

Coordinates: 38°19′04″N 23°24′12″E

Scolus or Skolos (Ancient Greek: Σκῶλος) was a town of ancient Boeotia. It is mentioned by Homer in the Catalogue of Ships in the Iliad, and described by Strabo as a village of the Parasopia below Cithaeron. Pausanias, in his description of the route from Plataea to Thebes, says, that if the traveler were, instead of crossing the Asopus, to follow that river for about 40 stadia, he would arrive at the ruins of Scolus, where there was an unfinished temple of Demeter and Core. Persian general Mardonius in his march from Tanagra to Plataea passed through Scolus. When the Lacedaemonians were preparing to invade Boeotia, in 377 BCE, the Thebans threw up an entrenchment in front of Scolus, which probably extended from Mt. Cithaeron to the Asopus. Strabo says that Scolus was so disagreeable and rugged (τραχύς) that it gave rise to the proverb, "never let us go to Scolus, nor follow any one there."

Its site is located at Neochoraki/Moustafades, near modern Soros.
