= Bryseae =

Ancient town of Laconia

Bryseae or Bryseai (Ancient Greek: Βρυσειαί, Βρυσεαί, or Βρυσιαί) was a town of ancient Laconia, southwest of Sparta, at the foot of Mount Taygetus. Its name occurs in the Iliad. It was a small village by the time of Pausanias, in the 2nd century CE. Pausanias does mention a temple of the Cult of Dionysus at Bryseae which only women could enter.

Bryseae's location is unknown. The English soldier, antiquary and spy William Martin Leake (1777–1860) claimed to have discovered the site of Bryseae at the village of Sinánbey near Sklavokóri (modern Amykles). He claimed that a marble artifact from the village, which was given to the British Museum, likely originated from the temple of Dionysus at Bryseae. The marble bears the name of two priestesses and it shows various articles of female apparel. Leake found another marble artifact at Sinánbey, now also in the British Museum. Leake's claims notwithstanding, modern scholars treat Bryseae's site as unlocated.
