= Copae =

Ancient Greek city

Coordinates: 38°29′35″N 23°09′39″E

Copae or Kopai (Ancient Greek: Κῶπαι), or Copia or Copiae, was an ancient Greek city (polis) in Boeotia, on the northern shore of Lake Copais, which derived its name from this town. Copae was part of Thersander's kingdom and is mentioned by Homer in the Catalogue of Ships in the Iliad. It was a member of the Boeotian League. It was still in existence in the time of Pausanias, who mentions here the temples of Demeter, Dionysus and Sarapis.

Its site is located near the village of Kastro, formerly Topolia.
