= Crocylea =

Krocylea (Greek: Κροκύλεια) is an Ancient Greek name of an island in the Ionian Sea, near Ithaca. In Homer's Iliad, book II, Krocylea is part of Odysseus's kingdom. Some researchers, including Wilhelm Dörpfeld estimate that Krocylea is present day island of Atokos or Meganisi

== See also ==
- Same
