= Nireus =

Greek mythological king

In Greek mythology, Nireus (Ancient Greek: Νιρεύς) was a king of the island Syme (according to Diodorus Siculus, also of a part of Cnidia) and one of the Homeric Greeks in the Trojan War. He was the second most handsome man in the Greek camp after Achilles and was physically weak.

== Biography ==
Nireus was the son of King Charopus and the nymph Aglaia. In one account, the hero Heracles was called his father.

== Mythology ==
=== Trojan War ===
Nireus was among the suitors of Helen and consequently joined in the campaign against Troy. According to different sources, he was said to have commanded a number of ships: 3, 16 or 53. In the military conflict with the Mysian king Telephus, which occurred on the way to Troy (during the first unsuccessful attempt to reach the city), Nireus killed Telephus' wife Hiera, who fought from a chariot "like an Amazon". Homer calls him "the most beautiful man who came beneath Ilion" (Iliad, 2.673).

Nireus did not excel in physical strength and was eventually killed by either Eurypylus, son of Telephus, or Aeneas. A funeral was held for him and his own people cremated him. However, according to the version recounted by John Tzetzes, Nireus survived the war and, together with Thoas, having been caught in the storm that scattered the Greek ships, landed first in Libya and then sailed off to Argyrinoi and the Ceraunian Mountains, where they settled near Mount Lakmynion and River Aias.

=== Other tales ===
In a rare version of the myth, Nireus was loved by Heracles and he helped the latter to beat down the lion of Helicon. But Ptolemy adds that certain authors made Nireus out to be a son of Heracles.
