= Augeiae (Laconia) =

Town of ancient Laconia

Augeiae or Augeiai (Ancient Greek: Αὐγειαί) was a town of ancient Laconia, mentioned by Homer in the Catalogue of Ships in the Iliad, Strabo says the town was the same as the later Aegiae. Pausanias agrees with Strabo in that the name of the city had changed, but with a small variation, since he calls it "Aegias", which he places at thirty stadia from Gythium and situates in it a lagoon with a temple and a statue of Poseidon. There was a superstition that those who caught fish from the lagoon would become fishermen.

If Augeiae is colocated with Aegiae, it is at 36°47′11″N 22°30′46″E.
