= Schoenus (Boeotia) =

City in ancient Boeotia

Coordinates: 38°25′39″N 23°21′44″E

Schoenus or Schoinos (Ancient Greek: Σχοῖνος) was a city in ancient Boeotia, located east of Thebes. Schoenus is mentioned by Homer as part of Thersander's domain in the Catalogue of Ships in the Iliad. Schoenus is placed by Strabo upon a river of the same name in the territory of Thebes, upon the road to Anthedon, and at the distance of 50 stadia from Thebes. This river is probably the stream flowing into the lake of Hylica from the valley of Mouriki, and which near its mouth is covered with rushes. Nicander is clearly wrong, who makes the Schoenus flow into Lake Copais. Schoenus was the birthplace of the celebrated Atalanta, the daughter of Schoenus; and hence Statius gives to Schoenus the epithet of "Atalantaeus."

Schoenus is located at a site in the modern village of Mouriki.
