= Orthe (Thessaly) =

Orthe (Greek: Ὄρθη) was a town of Perrhaebia in ancient Thessaly. mentioned by Homer as ruled by Polypoetes in the Catalogue of Ships in the Iliad. It was said by Strabo to have become the acropolis of Phalanna. It occurs, however, in the lists of Pliny the Elder as a distinct town from Phalanna. Some modern scholars accept the equivalence, while others only do so tentatively.
