= Phidippus (mythology) =

In Greek mythology, Phidippus /ˌfaɪˈdɪpəs/ (Greek Φείδιππος "he who spares the horses") was a son of Thessalus and Chalciope and brother of Antiphus and Nesson.

== Mythology ==
Phidippus was among the suitors of Helen and accordingly participated in the Trojan War; he and his brother Antiphus led a contingent of thirty ships from Nisyrus, Carpathus, Casus, Cos and Calydnae. After the war and the storm that scattered the Greek ships, Pheidippus and the Coans settled at Andros, while Antiphus went to the land of the Pelasgians and, having taken possession of it, called it Thessaly after their father. In another account, Antiphus and Phidippus were said to have invaded the land together; it is also reported that the region was believed to have had another name, Nessonis, after their third brother Nesson.
