= Podarces =

Character of Greek mythology

In Greek mythology, Podarces (Ancient Greek: Ποδάρκης) was a son of Iphiclus (son of Phylacus, founder of Phylace) by Diomedeia and the brother of Protesilaus. In some accounts, he and his brother were called the sons of Phylacus and Astyoche instead.

== Mythology ==
In Homer's Iliad, Podarces and Protesilaus were former suitors of Helen, and therefore bound to defend the marriage rights of Menelaus, her husband, when Helen was kidnapped by Paris. After Protesilaus was killed by Hector, Podarces led the Phylacian troops in the Trojan War, on the side of the Greeks. According to the Posthomerica, by Quintus of Smyrna, he was killed by Penthesilea, the Queen of the Amazons.

== Namesake ==
Podarces was also the original name of Priam, king of Troy.
