= Neritum =

Island in the Ionian Sea

Neritum (Greek: Νήριτον) is an Ancient Greek name of an island in the Ionian Sea, near Ithaca and Cephalonia. In Homer's Iliad, book II, Neritum is part of Odysseus's kingdom.
