= Aegilips =

Unidentified place mentioned in Homer

Aegilips (Homeric Greek: Αἰγίλιψ Αἰγίλιπα) is an Ancient Greek name of an island in the Ionian Sea, near Ithaca. In Homer's Iliad, book II, Aegilips is part of Odysseus's kingdom. According to an attempt by the ancient geographer Strabo to localize it, Aigilips was on the Ionian island of Leucas, together with the places Neritos and Krokyleia also mentioned in the ship catalogue, while the grammarian Stephanos of Byzantium localized all three places on the Ionian island of Ithaca. Some researchers, including Wilhelm Dörpfeld estimate that Aegilips is present day island of Meganisi.
