= Boeotia =

Region of Greece

Boeotia Περιφερειακή ενότητα Βοιωτίας
- Regional unit
- Municipalities of Boeotia

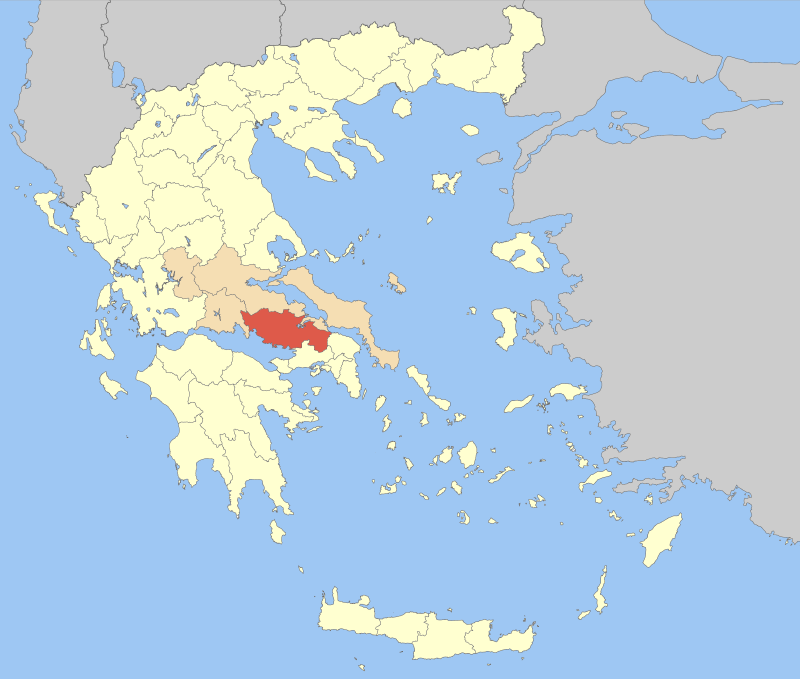
- Boeotia within Greece

- Location within Greece
- Coordinates: 38°26′N 22°53′E
- Country: Greece
- Administrative region: Central Greece
- Seat: Livadeia

Area
  - Total: 3,211 km^{2} (1,240 sq mi)

Population (2021)
  - Total: 106,056
  - Density: 33.03/km^{2} (85.54/sq mi)
- Time zone: UTC+2 (EET)
  - Summer (DST): UTC+3 (EEST)
- Postal code: 32x xx, 190 12
- Area code: 226x0
- Vehicle registration: ΒΙ
- Website: www.viotia.gr

Boeotia (/biˈoʊʃ(i)ə/ bee-OH-sh(ee-)ə; Greek: Βοιωτία, pronounced [vi.oˈti.a]; Ancient Greek: Βοιωτία, romanized: Boiotía) is one of the regional units of Greece. It is part of the region of Central Greece. Its capital is Livadeia, and its largest city is Thebes.

Boeotia was also a region of ancient Greece, from before the 6th century BC.

== Geography ==
Boeotia lies to the north of the eastern part of the Gulf of Corinth. It also has a short coastline on the Gulf of Euboea. It bordered on Megaris (now West Attica) in the south, Attica in the southeast, Euboea in the northeast, Opuntian Locris (now part of Phthiotis) in the north and Phocis in the west.

The main mountain ranges of Boeotia are Mount Parnassus in the west, Mount Helicon in the southwest, Cithaeron in the south and Parnitha in the east. Its longest river, the Cephissus, flows in the central part, where most of the low-lying areas of Boeotia are found.

Lake Copais was a large lake in the centre of Boeotia. It was drained in the 19th century. Lake Yliki is a large lake near Thebes.

== Origins ==
The origin of the name "Boeotians" may lie in the mountain Boeon in Epirus.

The earliest inhabitants of Boeotia, associated with the city of Orchomenus, were called Minyans. Pausanias mentions that Minyans established the maritime Ionian city of Teos, and occupied the islands of Lemnos and Thera. The Argonauts were sometimes referred to as Minyans. Also, according to legend, the citizens of Thebes paid an annual tribute to their king Erginus. The Minyans may have been proto-Greek speakers. Although most scholars today agree that the Myceneans descended from the Minyans of the Middle Helladic period, they believe that the progenitors and founders of Minyan culture were an indigenous people. The early wealth and power of Boeotia is shown by the reputation and visible Mycenean remains of several of its cities, especially Orchomenus and Thebes.

Some toponyms and the common Aeolic dialect indicate that the Boeotians were related to the Thessalians. Traditionally, the Boeotians are said to have originally occupied Thessaly, the largest fertile plain in Greece, and to have been dispossessed by the north-western Thessalians two generations after the Fall of Troy (1200 BC). They moved south and settled in another rich plain, while others filtered across the Aegean and settled on Lesbos and in Aeolis in Asia Minor. Others are said to have stayed in Thessaly, withdrawing into the hill country and becoming the perioikoi ("dwellers around"). Boeotia was an early member of the oldest Amphictyonic League (Anthelian), a religious confederacy of related tribes, despite its distance from the League's original home in Anthela.

Although they included great men such as Pindar, Hesiod, Epaminondas, Pelopidas, and Plutarch, the Boeotian people were portrayed as proverbially dull by the Athenians (cf. Boeotian ears incapable of appreciating music or poetry and Hog-Boeotians, Cratinus.310).

== Legends and literature ==
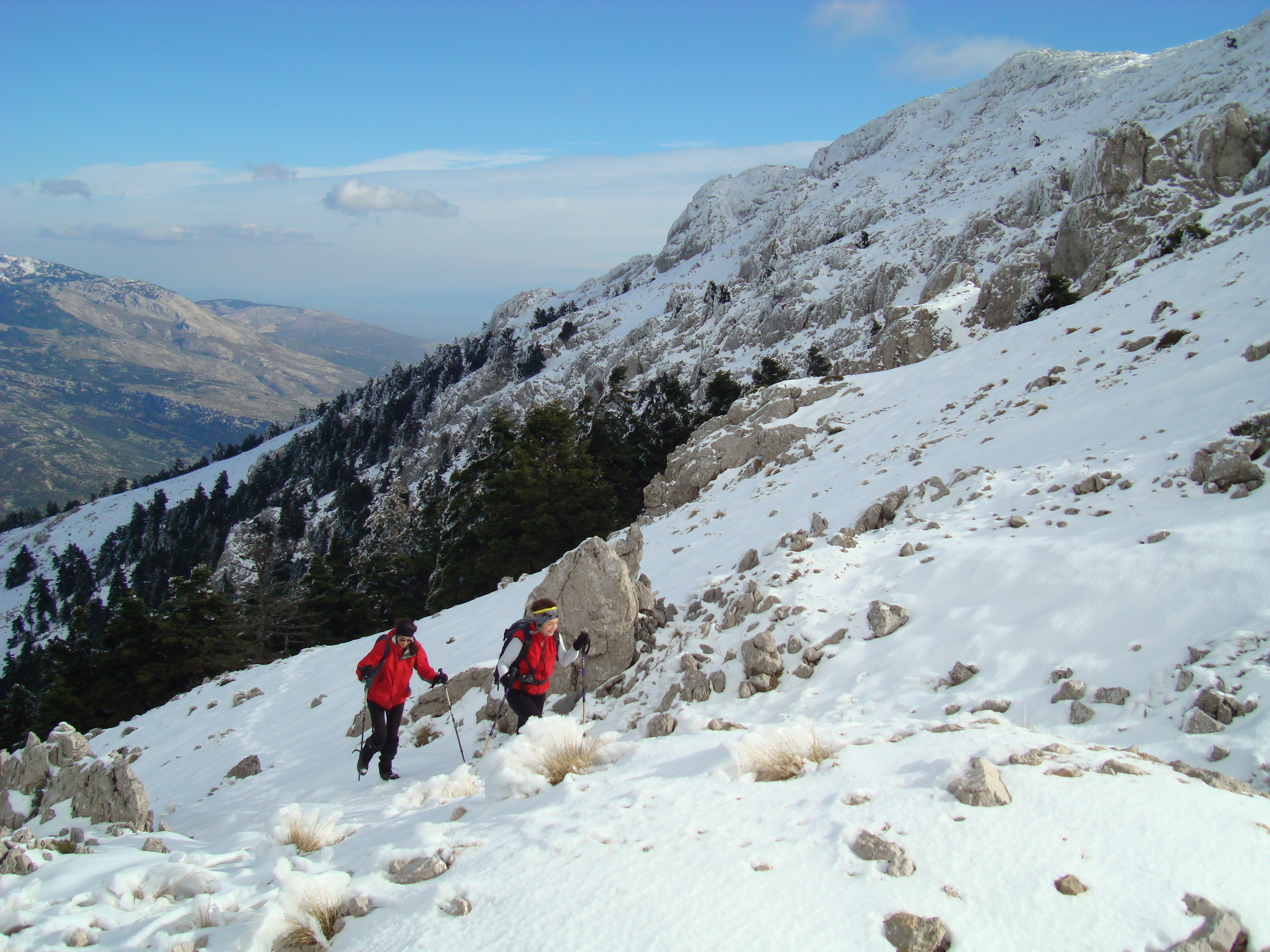
Mount Helicon

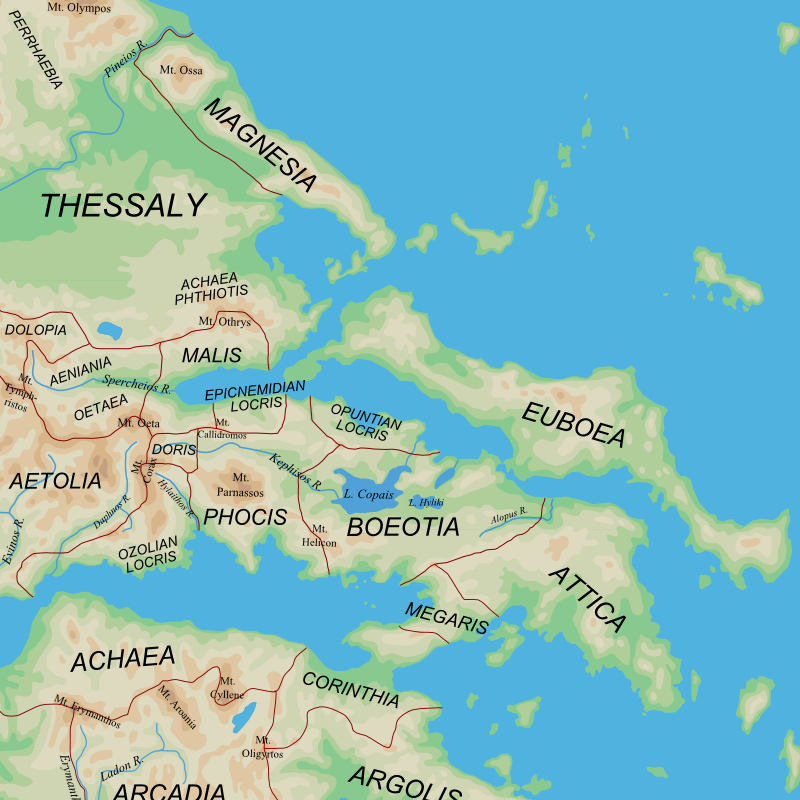
Map showing ancient regions of central Greece in relation to geographical features

Many ancient Greek legends originated from or are set in this region. The older myths took their final form during the Mycenean age (1600–1200 BC) when the Mycenean Greeks established themselves in Boeotia and the city of Thebes became an important centre. Many of them are related to the myths of Argos, and others indicate connections with Phoenicia, where the Mycenean Greeks and later the Euboean Greeks established trading posts.

Important legends related to Boeotia include:

- Eros, worshiped by a fertility cult in Thespiae
- The Muses of Mount Helicon
- Ogyges and the Ogygian deluge
- Cadmus, who was said to have founded Thebes and brought the alphabet to Greece
- Dionysus and Semele
- Narcissus
- Heracles, who was born in Thebes
- The Theban Cycle, including the myths of Oedipus and the Sphinx, and the Seven against Thebes
- Antiope and her sons Amphion and Zethus
- Niobe
- Orion, who was born in Boeotia and said to have fathered 50 sons with the daughters of a local river god.

Many of these legends were used in plays by the tragic Greek poets, Aeschylus, Sophocles, and Euripides:

- Aeschylus's Seven Against Thebes
- Sophocles's Oedipus Rex, Oedipus at Colonus, and Antigone, known as the Theban plays
- Euripides's Bacchae, Phoenician Women, Suppliants, and Heracles

They were also used in lost plays, such as Aeschylus's Niobe and Euripides's Antiope.

Boeotia was also notable for the ancient oracular shrine of Trophonius at Lebadea. Graea, an ancient city in Boeotia, is sometimes thought to be the origin of the Latin word Graecus, from which English derives the words Greece and Greeks.

The major poets Hesiod and Pindar were Boeotians. Nonetheless, the French use the term béotien ("Boeotian") to denote Philistinism.

== History ==
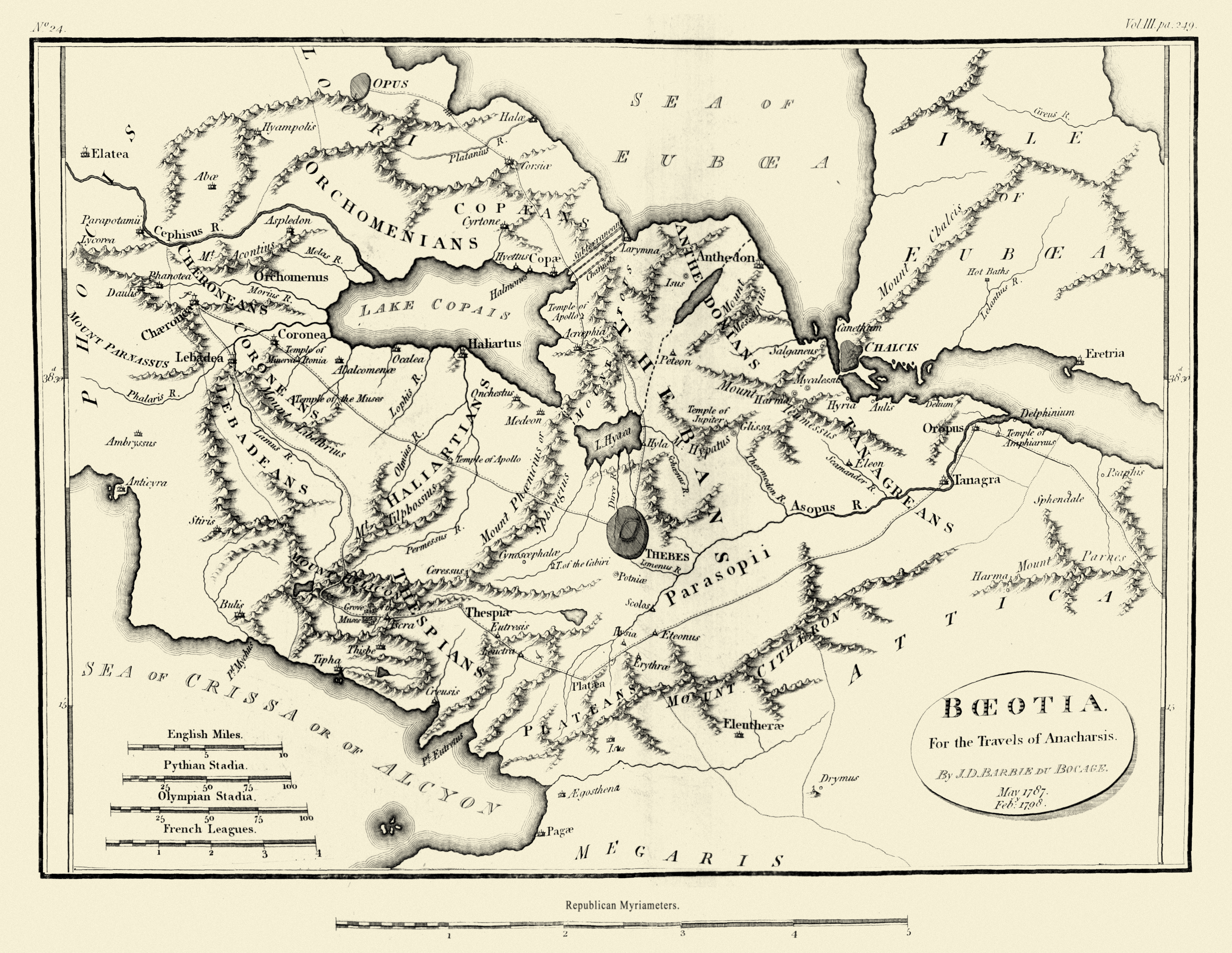
18th century map of ancient Boeotia

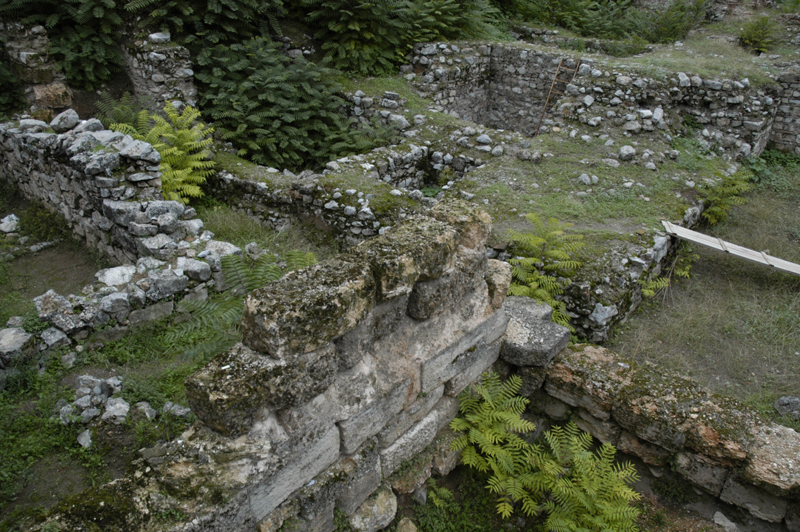
Ruins of the Cadmeia, the central fortress of ancient Thebes

Boeotia had significant political importance, owing to its position on the north shore of the Gulf of Corinth, the strategic strength of its frontiers, and the ease of communication within its extensive area. On the other hand, the lack of good harbours hindered its maritime development.

The importance of the legendary Minyae has been confirmed by archaeological remains (notably the "Treasury of Minyas"). The Boeotian population entered the land from the north, possibly before the Dorian invasion. With the exception of the Minyae, the original peoples were soon absorbed by these immigrants, and the Boeotians henceforth appear as a homogeneous nation. Aeolic Greek was spoken in Boeotia.

In historical times, the leading city of Boeotia was Thebes, whose central position and military strength made it a suitable capital; other major towns were Orchomenus, Plataea, and Thespiae. It was the constant ambition of the Thebans to absorb the other townships into a single state, just as Athens had annexed the Attic communities. But the outlying cities successfully resisted this policy, and only allowed the formation of a loose federation that, initially, was merely religious.

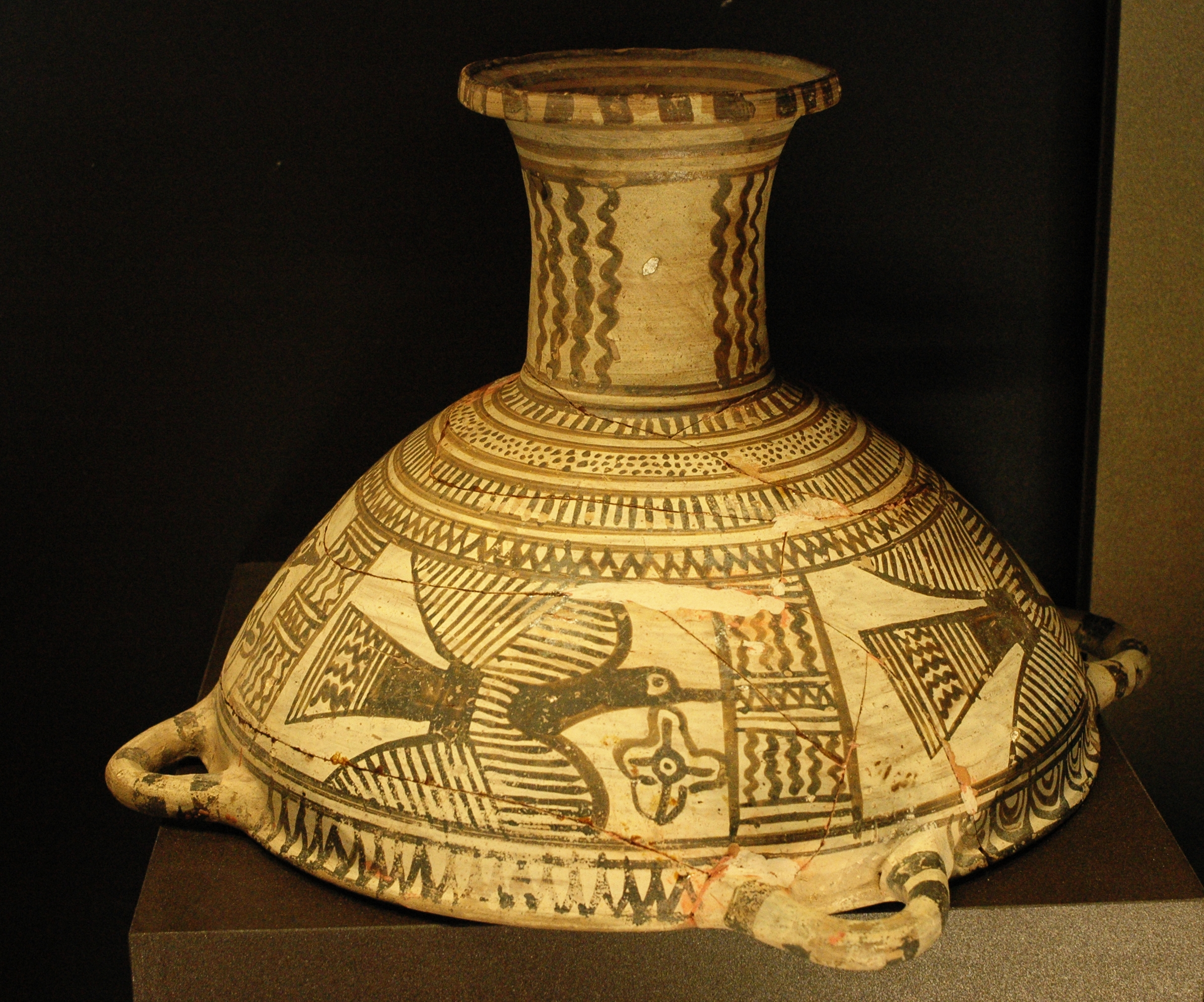
Boeotian cup from Thebes painted with birds, 560–540 BC (Louvre)

While the Boeotians, unlike the Arcadians, generally acted as a united whole against foreign enemies, the constant struggle between the cities was a serious check on the nation's development. Boeotia hardly figures in history before the late 6th century BC.

Previous to this, its people are chiefly known as the makers of a type of geometric pottery, similar to the Dipylon ware of Athens. In about 519 BC, the resistance of Plataea to the federating policy of Thebes led to the interference of Athens on behalf of the former; on this occasion, and again in 507 BC, the Athenians defeated the Boeotian levy.

The Works and Days by Hesiod is often used by economists and historians alike to provide invaluable evidence for the Boetian economic system and its developments in the Homeric Age. In the poem Hesiod, who lived in Boeotia, describes the beginnings of a modern economy, with the use of artisans to 'do the technical work in making his plow and wagon' and the beginnings of sea commerce and its increasing importance in the economic life of Greece.

=== Emigration of the Boeotians ===
According to myth, the Boeotians (Ancient Greek: Βοιώτιοι, romanised: Boiotioi) lived in Thessaly, especially in the area around Arne, though some may have gone to the Pagasitic Gulf before migrating to the land later termed Boeotia. The location of Arne is unknown, though sometimes it is equated with Cierium in Central Thessaly. The presence in Classical times in Boeotia of cults and place-names of Thessalian origin, such as Itonia and Itonian Athena, Homole and Homoloian Zeus, Alalcomenae, Corseia and Pharae, confirm for most scholars the merits of these traditions. It is, therefore, generally believed that the Boeotians originated in Thessaly and lived there as a distinct ethnos, in Phthiotis or in Thessaliotis, before they migrated to Boeotia, taking elements with them from other parts of Thessaly.

Boeotians were expelled from Thessaly after the Trojan war although there are three traditions that disagree on how expulsion played out. One tradition says that the Boiotoi were expelled by the Thessalians, who were led by Thessalus, son of Aiatus, son of Pheidippus, son of another Thessalus. Pheidippus appears in the Catalogue of ships as one of the commanders of the force from Cos and Carpathus. He was thought to have been driven to Epirus after the war and to have settled at Ephyra in the Thesprotid. Hence the Boiotoi were expelled two generations after the Trojan War. Hellanicus is probably the source of this tradition, and the source of Thucydides' "sixtieth year", that is, two generations of thirty years. A second tradition puts the expulsion of the Boiotoi in the reign of Aiatus, one generation after the War. To this should also belong the story in Plutarch, which tells how Opheltas king of the Boiotoi took Chaeronea "by force from the barbarians". Opheltas is the son of Peneleus, one of the leaders of the Boeotian contingent in the Catalogue, and living one generation after the war. It is not until the reign of Damasichthon, son of Opheltas, that control of Thebes was gained by the Boiotoi. Hence in this tradition one generation after the war, the Boiotoi were expelled and western Boeotia was invaded; two generations after the war, Thebes was won. A third tradition combines the other two: the two generations until the expulsion from Thessaly after the War and the two generations until Thebes is gained give the four generations cited by Hieronymus in his tale of the Cadmean return to Thebes after the war.

The entry-point to Boeotia by Boeotians seems to be put in the same general area by all traditions. The second tradition gives Chaeronea as the first place attacked, while the first says that Coronea and Orchomenus were captured virtually simultaneously and then the sanctuary of Itonian Athena was founded. It is clear that both traditions envisaged the Boiotoi as following a well-known invasion route from Thessaly, the one via Thermopylae and Hyampolis to Chaeronea, where the invaders would be poised to attack both Orchomenus and Coronea. Having gained control of Chaeronea, Orchomenus and Coronea, and their territories, the Boiotoi seem to have paused to digest western Boeotia; the generation or two before Thebes was captured marks this pause in all traditions. The siting close to Coronea of the sanctuary of Itonian Athena, and the celebration of the Pamboeotia there, together with the renaming of rivers and other toponyms, and the sanctity attached to the neighbouring settlement of Alalcomenae, all strengthen the belief that this western section was the area where the first Boeotian settlement took place, and where Boeotian institutions were first established in the new homeland. The advance eastward eventually proceeded both to the north and to the south of Copais lake. On the north side it ultimately reached Anthedon, a town credited with once having been occupied by the Thracians. On the south side it came as far as Thebes and Thespiae. In Thebes, according to one version, Damasichthon took the rule from Autesion, son of Tisamenus, son of Thersander, another stemma that puts the Boeotians in Thebes two generations after the Trojan War. The tradition intimates that there was a peaceful take-over, with Autesion joining the Dorians. There must have been another pause for some time. The next advance, into the Asopus valley, was led by Xanthus, son of Ptolemy, son of Damasichthon, that is, two generations after the gaining of Thebes. The Thebans remembered, according to Thucydides, that the Asopus valley and Plataea were reduced later than the rest of Boeotia and were occupied in accordance with an agreed plan. The Boeotian advance was apparently stalled on what became the Athenian-Boeotian frontier, by the efforts of local forces, if the legend of Xanthus and Melanthus has any historical significance. In any event the death of Xanthus symbolised traditionally the completion of the conquest of Boeotia under the kings and the consequent immediate extinction of the kingship.

=== Fifth century BC ===
Map of ancient Boeotia

During the Persian invasion of 480 BC, Thebes assisted the invaders. In consequence, for a time, the presidency of the Boeotian League was taken from Thebes, but in 457 BC the Spartans reinstated that city as a bulwark against Athenian aggression after the Battle of Tanagra. Athens retaliated with a sudden advance upon Boeotia, and after the victory at the Battle of Oenophyta took control of the whole country, taking down the wall the Spartans had built. With the victory the Athenians also occupied Phocis, the original source of the conflict, and Opuntian Locris. For ten years, the land remained under Athenian control, which was exercised through the newly installed democracies; but in 447 BC the people revolted, and after a victory at the Battle of Coronea regained their independence.

In the Peloponnesian War, the Boeotians fought zealously against Athens. Although slightly estranged from Sparta after the peace of Nicias, they never abated their enmity against their neighbours. They rendered good service at Syracuse and at the Battle of Arginusae in the closing years of the Peloponnesian War; but their greatest achievement was the decisive victory at the Battle of Delium over the Athenian army (424 BC) in which both their heavy infantry and their cavalry displayed unusual efficiency.

=== Boeotian League ===
Members of the Boeotian League with their number of Boeotarchs in brackets, 395 BC. Members of the same colour with fractional numbers elected 1 or 2 Boeotarchs between them. Black: conquered by Thebes

According to the Hellenica Oxyrhynchia, in 395 BC, the Boeotian League comprised eleven groups of sovereign cities and associated townships, each of which elected one Boeotarch or minister of war and foreign affairs, contributed sixty delegates to the federal council at Thebes, and supplied a contingent of about 1,000 infantry and 100 cavalry to the federal army. A safeguard against undue encroachment on the part of the central government was provided in the councils of the individual cities, to which all important questions of policy had to be submitted for ratification. These local councils, to which the propertied classes alone were eligible, were subdivided into four sections, resembling the prytaneis of the Athenian council, which took it in turns to vote on all new measures.

Two Boeotarchs were provided by Thebes, but by 395 BC Thebes was providing four Boeotarchs, including two who had represented places now conquered by Thebes such as Plataea, Scolus, Erythrae, and Scaphae. Orchomenus, Hysiae, and Tanagra each supplied one Boeotarch. Thespiae, Thisbe, and Eutresis supplied two between them. Haliartus, Lebadea and Coronea supplied one in turn, and so did Acraephia, Copae, and Chaeronea.

The total military force of the Boiotian League (11,000 infantry and 1,100 cavalry) has been used as the basis for a number of calculations of the population of the region in the early fourth century BC. John Bintliff assumes an additional 21,000 light troops and rowers in the navy, for a total of 33,100 men. Assuming the same number of women, two children and one slave for every household, he estimates the total Boeotian population at 165,500 (including 33,100 slaves). Mogens Herman Hansen assumes an additional 12,100 light troops, for a total of 24,200 men in the army. He assumes that 25% of men were ineligible for military service, so his total population of men between the ages of twenty and fifty is 30,250. Using model life tables he calculates a total male citizen population of 72,240 and an equal number of women, for a minimum free population of 144,050, plus an unknown number of slaves and foreign residents. He proposes a maximum of 250,000. By comparison, the population of Boeotia was 38,000–50,000 in the late sixteenth century, according to tahrir records, 40,000–42,000 in the 1889 census, and 117,920 in the 2011 census.

=== Fourth century BC ===
Boeotia took a prominent part in the Corinthian War against Sparta, especially in the battles of Haliartus and Coronea (395–394 BC). This change of policy was mainly due to the popular resentment against foreign interference. Yet disaffection against Thebes was now growing rife, and Sparta fostered this feeling by insisting on the complete independence of all the cities in the Peace of Antaclidas (387 BC). In 374 BC, Pelopidas restored Theban dominance. Boeotian contingents fought in all the campaigns of Epaminondas against the Spartans, most notably at the Battle of Leuctra in 371 BC, and in the Third Sacred War against Phocis (356–346 BC); while in the dealings with Philip of Macedon the cities merely followed Thebes.

The federal constitution was also brought into accord with the democratic governments now prevalent throughout the land. Sovereign power was vested in the popular assembly, which elected the Boeotarchs (between seven and twelve in number), and sanctioned all laws. After the Battle of Chaeroneia, in which the Boeotian heavy infantry once again distinguished itself, the land never again rose to prosperity.

=== Hellenistic period ===
The destruction of Thebes by Alexander the Great (335 BC) destroyed the political energy of the Boeotians. They never again pursued an independent policy, but followed the lead of protecting powers. Although military training and organization continued, the people proved unable to defend the frontiers, and the land became more than ever the "dancing-ground of Ares". Although enrolled for a short time in the Aetolian League (about 245 BC), Boeotia was generally loyal to Macedon, and supported its later kings against Rome. Rome dissolved the league in 171 BC, but it was revived under Augustus, and merged with the other central Greek federations in the Achaean synod. The death-blow to the country's prosperity was dealt by the devastations during the First Mithridatic War.

=== Middle Ages and later ===
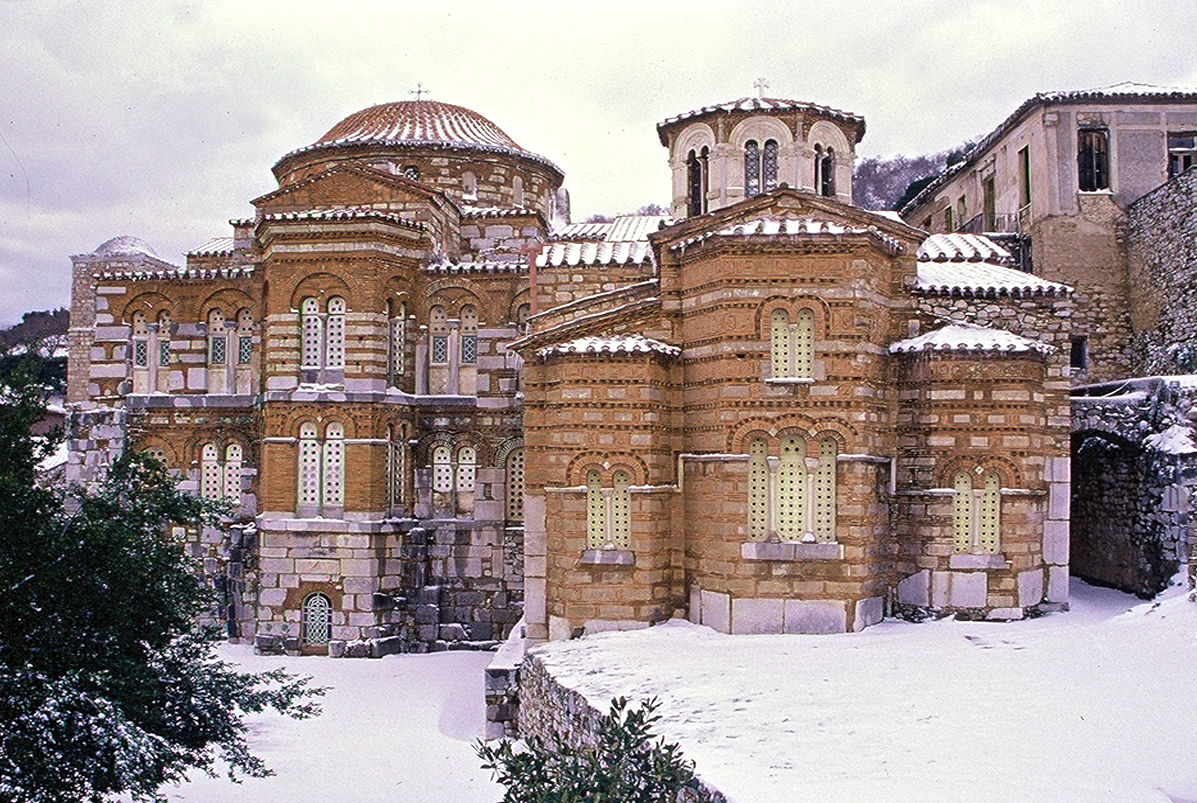
Hosios Loukas

Save for a short period of prosperity under the Frankish rulers of Athens (1205–1310), who repaired the underground drainage channels (καταβόθρα katavóthra) of Lake Kopais and fostered agriculture, Boeotia long continued in a state of decay, aggravated by occasional barbarian incursions. The first step toward the country's recovery was not until 1895, when the drainage channels of Kopais were again put into working order.

== Archaeological sites ==
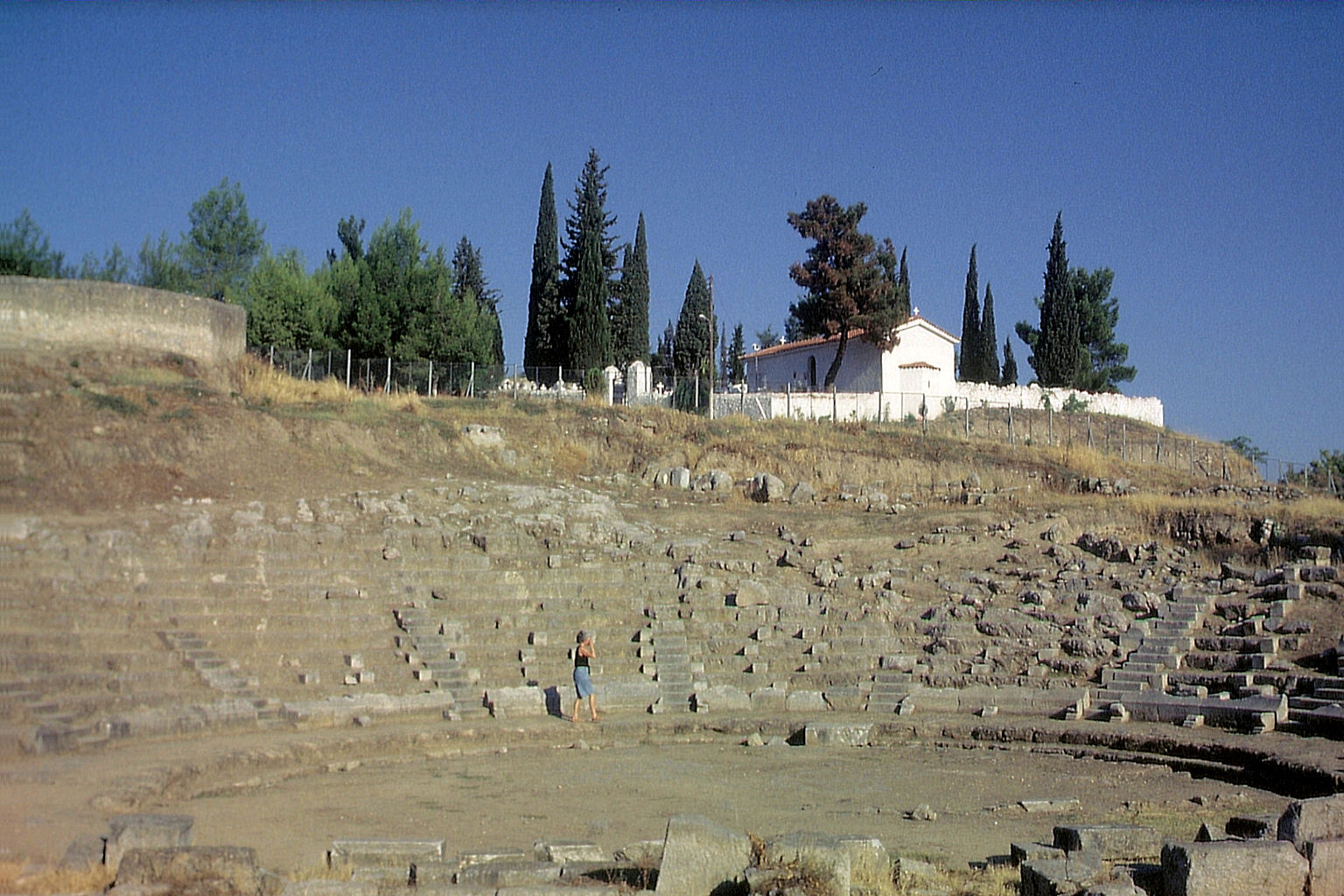
Ancient theatre of Orchomenus

In 1880–86, Heinrich Schliemann's excavations at Orchomenus (H. Schliemann, Orchomenos, Leipzig 1881) revealed the tholos tomb he called the "Tomb of Minyas", a Mycenaean monument that equalled the beehive tomb known as the Treasury of Atreus at Mycenae. In 1893, A. de Ridder excavated the temple of Asclepios and some burials in the Roman necropolis. In 1903–05, a Bavarian archaeological mission under Heinrich Bulle and Adolf Furtwängler conducted successful excavations at the site. Research continued in 1970–73 by the Archaeological Service under Theodore Spyropoulos, uncovering the Mycenaean palace, a prehistoric cemetery, the ancient amphitheatre, and other structures.

== Administration ==
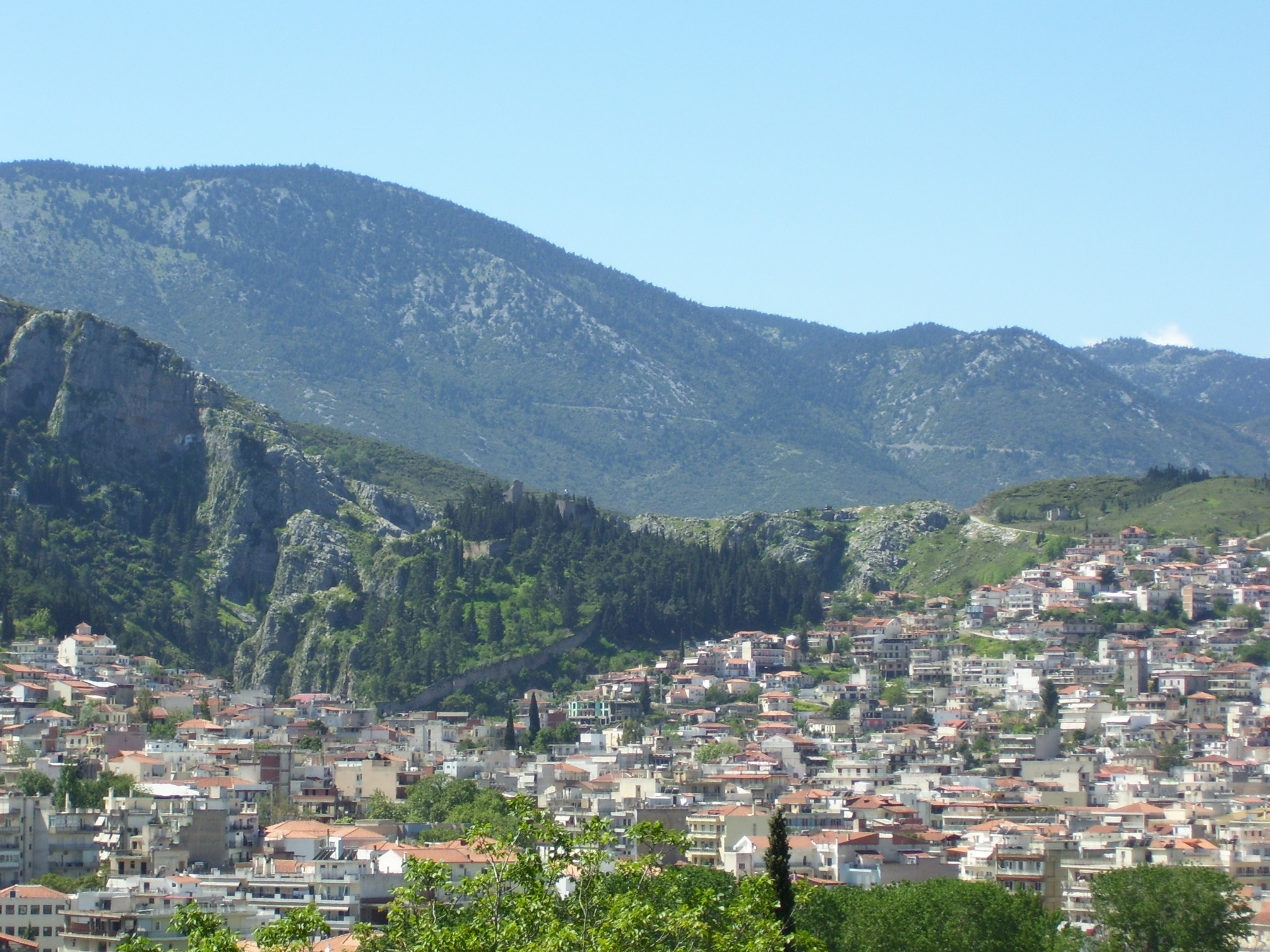
View of Livadeia town

The regional unit Boeotia is subdivided into 6 municipalities. These are (number as in the map in the infobox):

- Aliartos-Thespies (2)
- Distomo-Arachova-Antikyra (3)
- Livadeia (1)
- Orchomenos (5)
- Tanagra (6)
- Thebes (Thiva, 4)

=== Prefecture ===
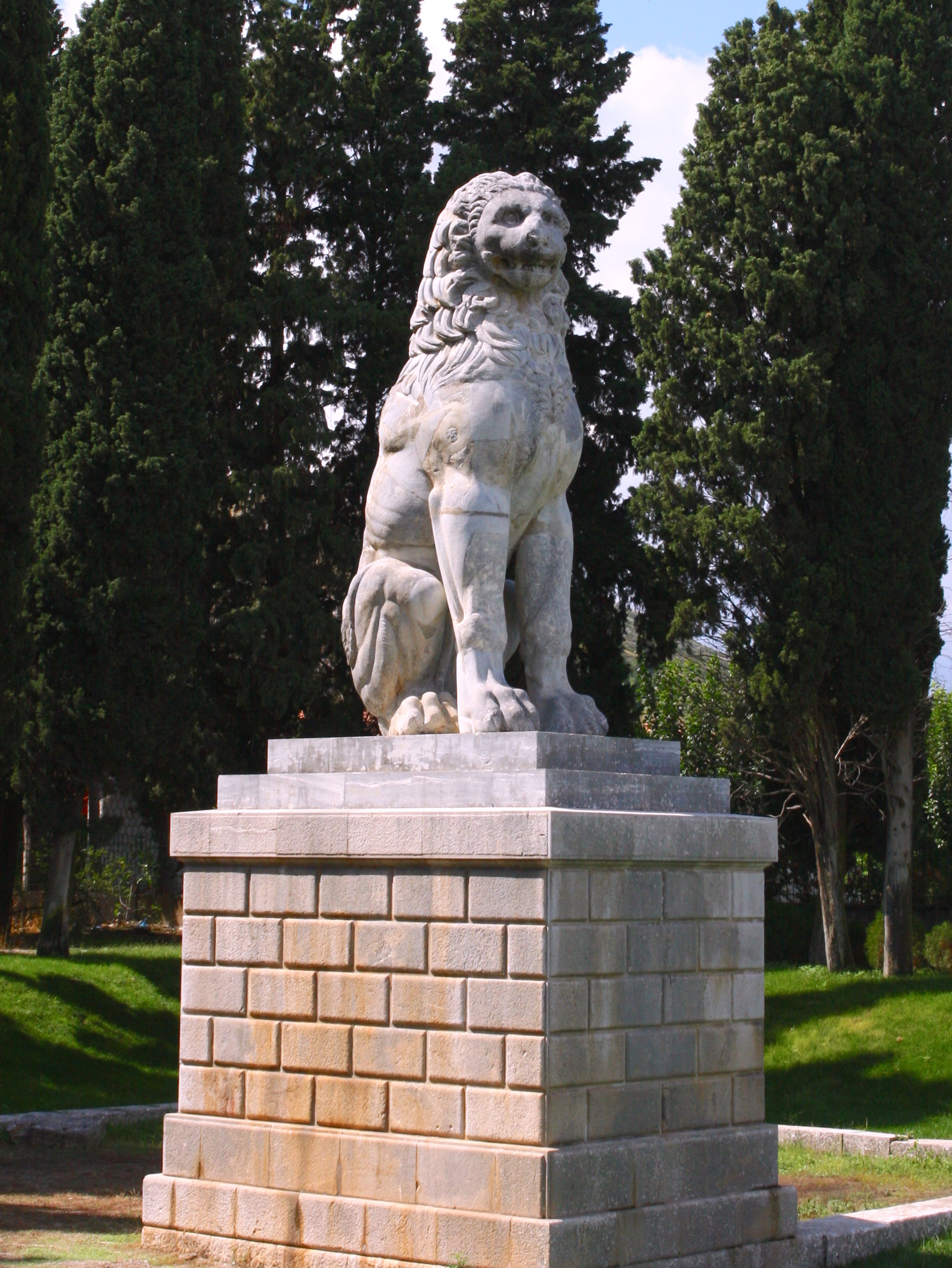
The lion of Chaeronea

Boeotia was created as a prefecture in 1836 (Greek: Διοίκησις Βοιωτίας), again in 1899 (Νομός Βοιωτίας) and again in 1943; in all cases it was split from Attica and Boeotia Prefecture. As a part of the 2011 Kallikratis government reform, the regional unit Boeotia was created out of the former prefecture Boeotia. The prefecture had the same territory as the present regional unit. At the same time, the municipalities were reorganised, according to the table below.

New municipality	Old municipalities & communities	Seat
Aliartos	Aliartos	Aliartos
Aliartos	Thespies	Aliartos
Distomo-Arachova-Antikyra	Distomo	Distomo
Distomo-Arachova-Antikyra	Arachova	Distomo
Distomo-Arachova-Antikyra	Antikyra	Distomo
Livadeia	Livadeia	Livadeia
Livadeia	Davleia	Livadeia
Livadeia	Koroneia	Livadeia
Livadeia	Kyriaki	Livadeia
Livadeia	Chaironeia	Livadeia
Orchomenus	Orchomenus	Orchomenus
Orchomenus	Akraifnia	Orchomenus
Tanagra	Tanagra	Schimatari
Tanagra	Dervenochoria	Schimatari
Tanagra	Oinofyta	Schimatari
Tanagra	Schimatari	Schimatari
Thebes (Thiva)	Thebes	Thebes
Thebes (Thiva)	Vagia	Thebes
Thebes (Thiva)	Thisvi	Thebes
Thebes (Thiva)	Plataies	Thebes

=== Provinces ===
The provinces were:

- Livadeia Province – Livadeia
- Thebes Province – Thebes

== Economy ==
Boeotia is the home of the third largest pasta factory in Europe, built by MISKO, a member of Barilla Group. Also, some of the biggest companies in Greece and Europe have factories in this place. For example, Nestlé and Viohalco have factories in Oinofyta, Boeotia.

=== Transport ===
The Piraeus–Platy railway runs through Boeotia, with the Oinoi–Chalcis railway branching off at Oinoi towards Chalcis. The regional unit is also served by the following main roads: the A1 motorway, also part of European route E75; the A11; the EO3, also part of European route E962 south of Thebes, EO29; the EO44, towards Euboea; and the EO48. In addition, the EO46 is a short airport road to Tanagra Air Base, passing through Schimatari.

== Natives of Boeotia ==
- Bakis
- Brachyllas
- Corinna
- Epaminondas
- Gorgidas
- Hesiod
- Luke the Evangelist (traditionally location of his death)
- Pelopidas
- Pindar
- Plutarch
- Scamander of Boeotia

== See also ==
- Boeotian helmet
- Boeotian shield
- List of settlements in Boeotia
- Graïke

== Sources ==
- Cambitoglou, Alexander; Descœudres, Jean-Paul (1990). Eumousia: Ceramic and Iconographic Studies in Honour of Alexander Cambitoglou. Sydney, Australia: Meditarch. ISBN 0-909797-17-X.
- Larson, Stephanie L. Tales of epic ancestry: Boiotian collective identity in the late archaic and early classical periods (Historia Einzelschriften, 197). Stuttgart: Franz Steiner, 2007, p. 238
