= Nicostratus =

Nicostratus may refer to:

in fiction and mythology:

- Nicostratus (mythology), a son of Menelaos by Helen of Troy or a slavewoman

== Persons with this name ==
- Nicostratus (comic poet), son of Aristophanes, a poet of the Middle Comedy (4th century BC)
- Nicostratus of Rhodes, a Rhodian commander in the 2nd century BC, companion of Agesilochus
- Nicostratus of Macedonia, 2nd century AD rhetorician
- Nicostratus of Acaia, strategos of the Achaean League in 198-187 BC
- A saint converted by Saint Sebastian (see Mark and Marcellian)
- One of the Four Crowned Martyrs, died ca. 304, feast day 8 November
