= Helen of Troy =

Most beautiful woman in Greek mythology

Helen
- Queen of Sparta; Princess of Troy; Patron deity of sailors
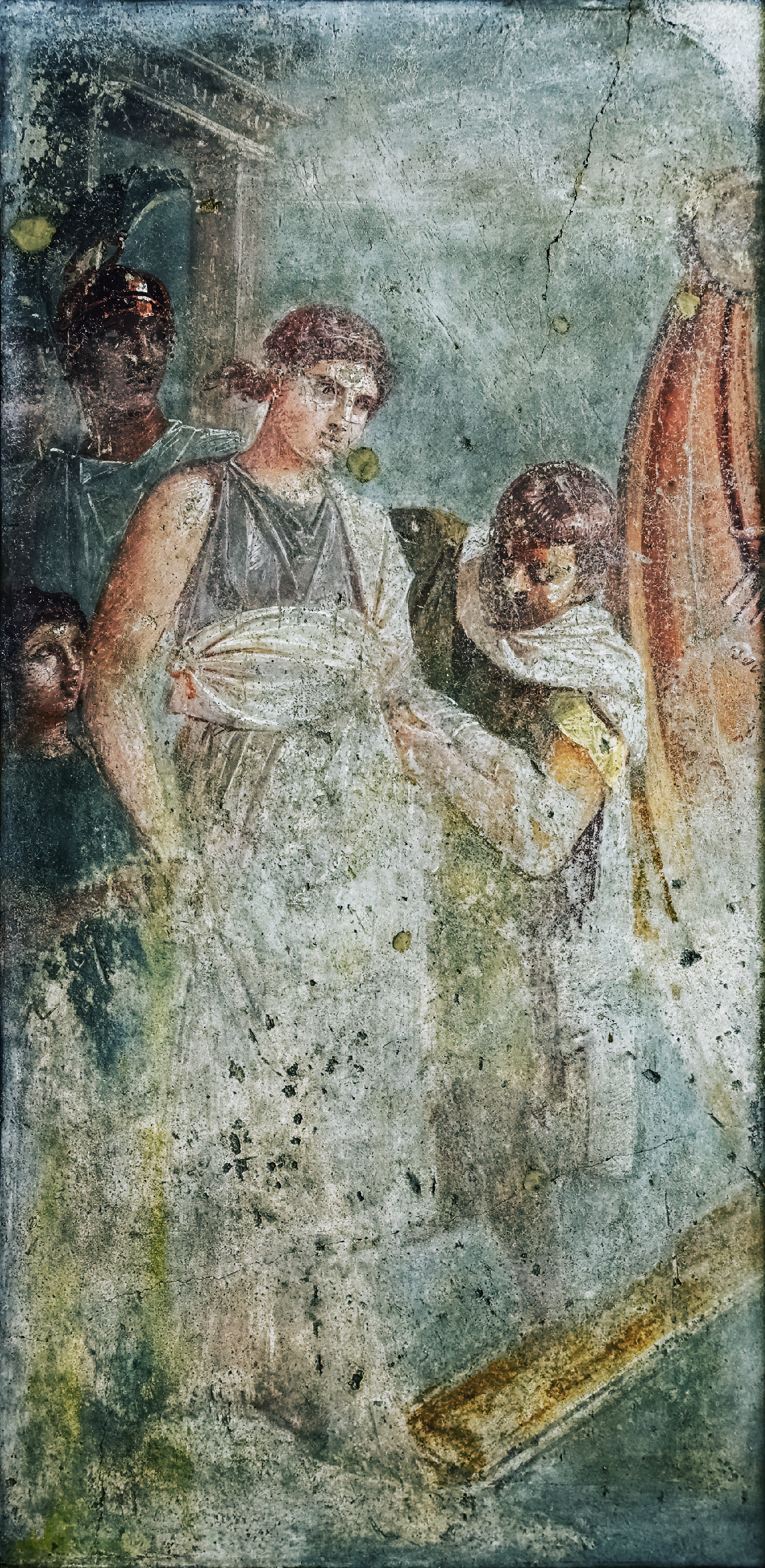
- Helen of Sparta boards a ship for Troy, fresco from the House of the Tragic Poet in Pompeii
- Abode: Sparta; Troy

Genealogy
- Born: Sparta
- Died: Rhodes (according to Pausanias) (Note: Taken on Olympus while still alive according to Euripides.)
- Parents: Zeus; Leda or Nemesis
- Siblings: Castor and Pollux, Clytemnestra, Timandra, Philonoe
- Spouse: Menelaus; Paris; Deiphobus
- Offspring: Hermione, various others in different stories

Helen (Ancient Greek: Ἑλένη, romanized: Helénē; (Note: pronounced [helénɛː]) Latin: Helena), commonly known as Helen of Troy and sometimes as Helen of Sparta, is a figure in Greek mythology said to have been the most beautiful woman in the world. She was believed to have been the daughter of Zeus by Leda or Nemesis, and the sister of Clytemnestra, Castor, Pollux, Philonoe, Phoebe and Timandra. She was first married to King Menelaus of Sparta "who became by her the father of Hermione, and, according to others, of Nicostratus also." Her subsequent marriage to Paris of Troy was the most immediate cause of the Trojan War.

Elements of her putative biography come from ancient Greek and Roman authors such as Homer, Hesiod, Euripides, Virgil and Ovid. In her youth, she was abducted by Theseus. A competition between her suitors for her hand in marriage saw Menelaus emerge victorious. All of her suitors were required to swear an oath (known as the Oath of Tyndareus) promising to provide military assistance to the winning suitor, if Helen were ever stolen from him. The obligations of the oath precipitated the Trojan War. When she married Menelaus she was still very young. In most accounts, including Homer's, Helen ultimately fell in love with Paris and willingly went to Troy with him, though there are also stories in which she was abducted.

The legends of Helen during her time in Troy are contradictory. Homer depicts her ambivalently, both regretful of her choice and sly in her attempts to redeem her public image. Other accounts have a treacherous Helen who simulated Bacchic rites and rejoiced in the carnage she caused. In some versions, Helen does not arrive in Troy, but instead waits out the war in Egypt. Ultimately, Paris was killed in action, and in Homer's account, Helen was reunited with Menelaus, though other versions of the legend recount her ascending to Olympus instead. A cult associated with her developed in Hellenistic Laconia, both at Sparta and elsewhere; at Therapne she shared a shrine with Menelaus. She was also worshipped in Attica and on Rhodes.

Stories of her beauty have inspired artists and writers to represent her as the personification of ideal human beauty. Images of Helen started appearing in the 7th century BC. In Classical Greece, her elopement—or abduction—was a popular motif. In medieval illustrations, this event was frequently portrayed as a seduction, whereas in Renaissance paintings it was usually depicted as a "rape" (i. e., a forced abduction) by Paris. (Note: Interchangeable usage of the terms rape and elope often lends ambiguity to the legend.) Christopher Marlowe's lines from his tragedy Doctor Faustus (1604) are frequently cited: "Was this the face that launched a thousand ships / And burnt the topless towers of Ilium?" (Note: The meeting with Helen in Marlowe's play and the ensuing temptation are not unambiguously positive, since they are closely followed by Faust's death and descent to Hell.)

== Etymology ==
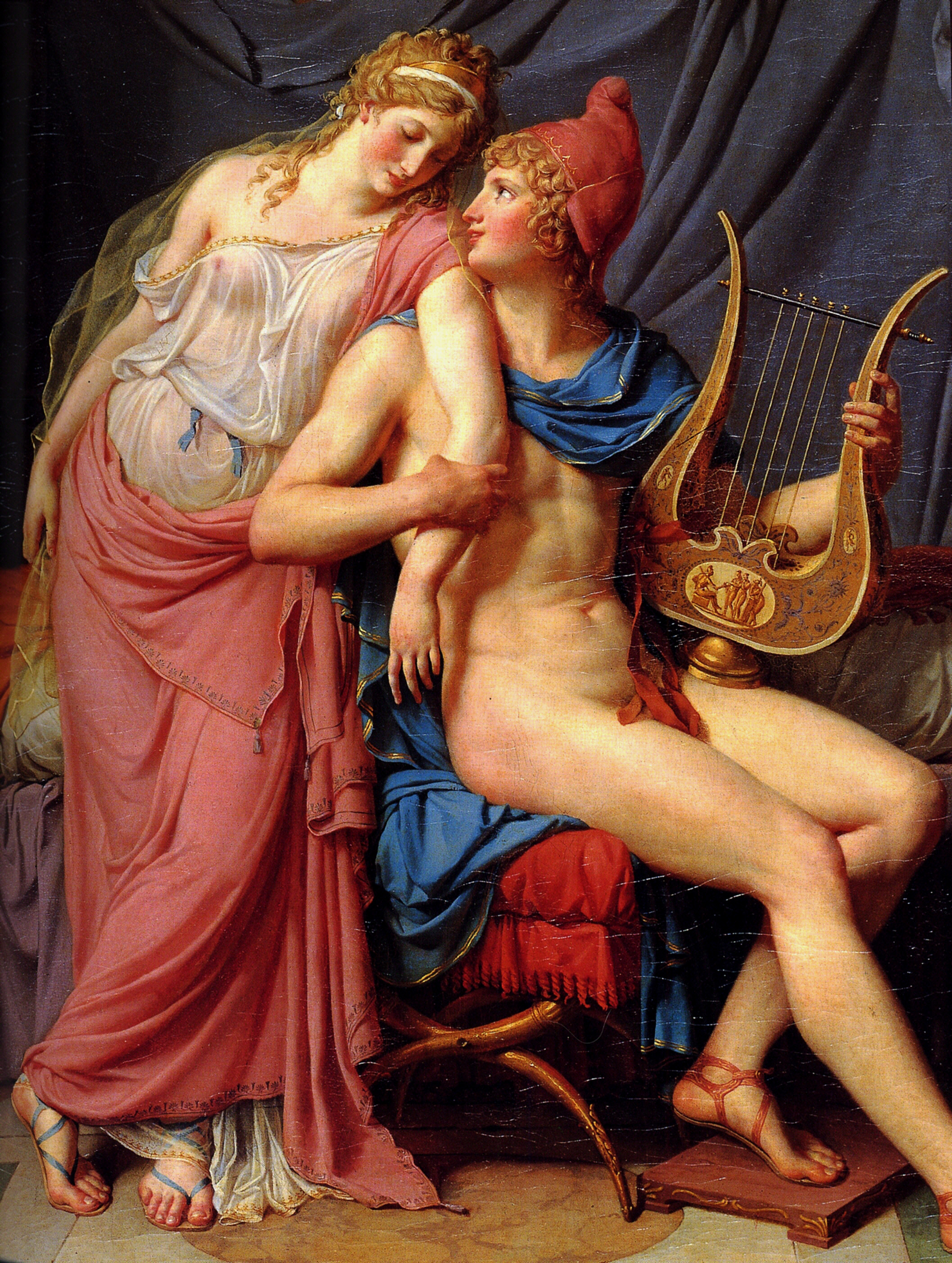
The Love of Helen and Paris by Jacques-Louis David (oil on canvas, 1788, Louvre, Paris)

The etymology of Helen's name continues to be a problem for scholars. In the 19th century, Georg Curtius related Helen (Ἑλένη) to the moon (Selene; Σελήνη). But two early dedications to Helen in the Laconian dialect of ancient Greek spell her name with an initial digamma (Ϝ, probably pronounced like a w-), which rules out any etymology originally starting with simple *s-.

In the early 20th century, Émile Boisacq considered Ἑλένη to derive from the well-known noun ἑλένη meaning "torch". It has also been suggested that the λ of Ἑλένη arose from an original ν, and thus the etymology of the name would be connected with the root of Venus. Linda Lee Clader, however, says that none of the above suggestions offers much satisfaction. (Note: If the name has an Indo-European etymology, it is possibly a suffixed form of a Proto-Indo-European root *wel- "to turn, roll" (or from that root's sense "to cover, enclose" – compare the theonyms Varuna, Veles), or of *sel- "to flow, run". The latter possibility would allow comparison to the Vedic Sanskrit Saraṇyū, a character who is abducted in Rigveda 10.17.2. This parallel is suggestive of a Proto-Indo-European abduction myth. Saraṇyū means "swift" and is derived from the adjective saraṇa ("running, swift"), the feminine of which is saraṇā; this is in every sound cognate with Ἑλένα, the form of her name that has no initial digamma. (Note: The name of Helen as worshipped at Sparta and Therapne began with a digamma. On the other hand, at Corinth, there is evidence of Helen without a digamma. Skutsch (Helen, 189 f. and passim) suggests that we have to make do "with two different names, two different mythological Helens".) The possible connection of Helen's name to ἑλένη ("torch"), as noted above, may also support the relationship of her name to Vedic svaranā ("the shining one"). (Note: Compare Proto-Indo-European *sa(e)wol, whence Greek helios, Latin sol, Sanskrit suryah, ultimately from *sawel "to shine". The relation with Selene is quite possible.))

More recently, Otto Skutsch has advanced the theory that the name Helen might have two separate etymologies, which belong to different mythological figures respectively, namely *Sṷelenā (related to Sanskrit svaraṇā "the shining one") and *Selenā, the first a Spartan goddess, connected to one or the other natural light phenomenon (especially St. Elmo's fire) and sister of the Dioscuri, the other a vegetation goddess worshiped in Therapne as Ἑλένα Δενδρῖτις ("Helena of the Trees").

Others have connected the name's etymology to a hypothetical Proto-Indo-European sun goddess, noting the name's connection to the word for "sun" in various Indo-European cultures including the Greek proper word and god for the sun, Helios. In particular, her marriage myth may be connected to a broader Indo-European "marriage drama" of the sun goddess, and she is related to the divine twins, just as many of these goddesses are. Martin L. West has thus proposed that Helena ("mistress of sunlight") may be constructed on the PIE suffix -nā ("mistress of"), connoting a deity controlling a natural element.

Other researchers consider it impossible to determine the etymology of the name Helen.

== Prehistoric and mythological context ==
Map of Homeric Greece; Menelaus and Helen reign over Laconia

Helen first appears in the poems of Homer, after which she became a popular figure in Greek literature. These works are set in the final years of the Age of Heroes, a mythological era which features prominently in the Greek mythological canon. Because the Homeric poems are known to have been transmitted orally before being written down, some scholars speculate that such stories were passed down from earlier Mycenaean Greek tradition, and that the Age of Heroes may itself reflect a mythologized memory of that era.

Recent archaeological excavations in Greece suggest that modern-day Laconia was a distinct territory in the Late Bronze Age, while the poets narrated that it was a rich kingdom. Archaeologists have unsuccessfully looked for a Mycenaean palatial complex buried beneath present-day Sparta. Modern findings suggest the area around Menelaion in the southern part of the Eurotas valley seems to have been the center of Mycenaean Laconia.

== Family ==
Helen nursing Hermione with Turan (Aphrodite) and Paris by her side. Etruscan bronze mirror, 5th century BC

Helen and Menelaus had a daughter, Hermione. Hesiod says she was "a child unlooked for," and Homer writes she was Helen's first and only child. Different sources say she was also the mother of one or more sons, named Aethiolas, Nicostratus, Megapenthes and Pleisthenes. Still, according to others, these were instead illegitimate children of Menelaus and various lovers.

According to other sources that also contradict Homer, Helen and Paris had four sons—Corythus, Bunomus, Aganus and Idaeus—and a daughter whom Helen named after herself after winning a game of knucklebones against Paris. Scholia to Homer's Odyssey record another son called Helenus. Dictys Cretensis claims that Corythus, Bunomus and Idaeus died during the Trojan War when an earthquake caused the roof of the room where they slept to collapse. According to the Cypria, Aganus was taken by his parents to Cyprus alongside his half-brother Pleisthenes. Her daughter by Paris was, according to Ptolemy Chennus, killed by her own grandmother, Hecuba, during the fall of Troy.

== Mythology ==
=== Birth ===
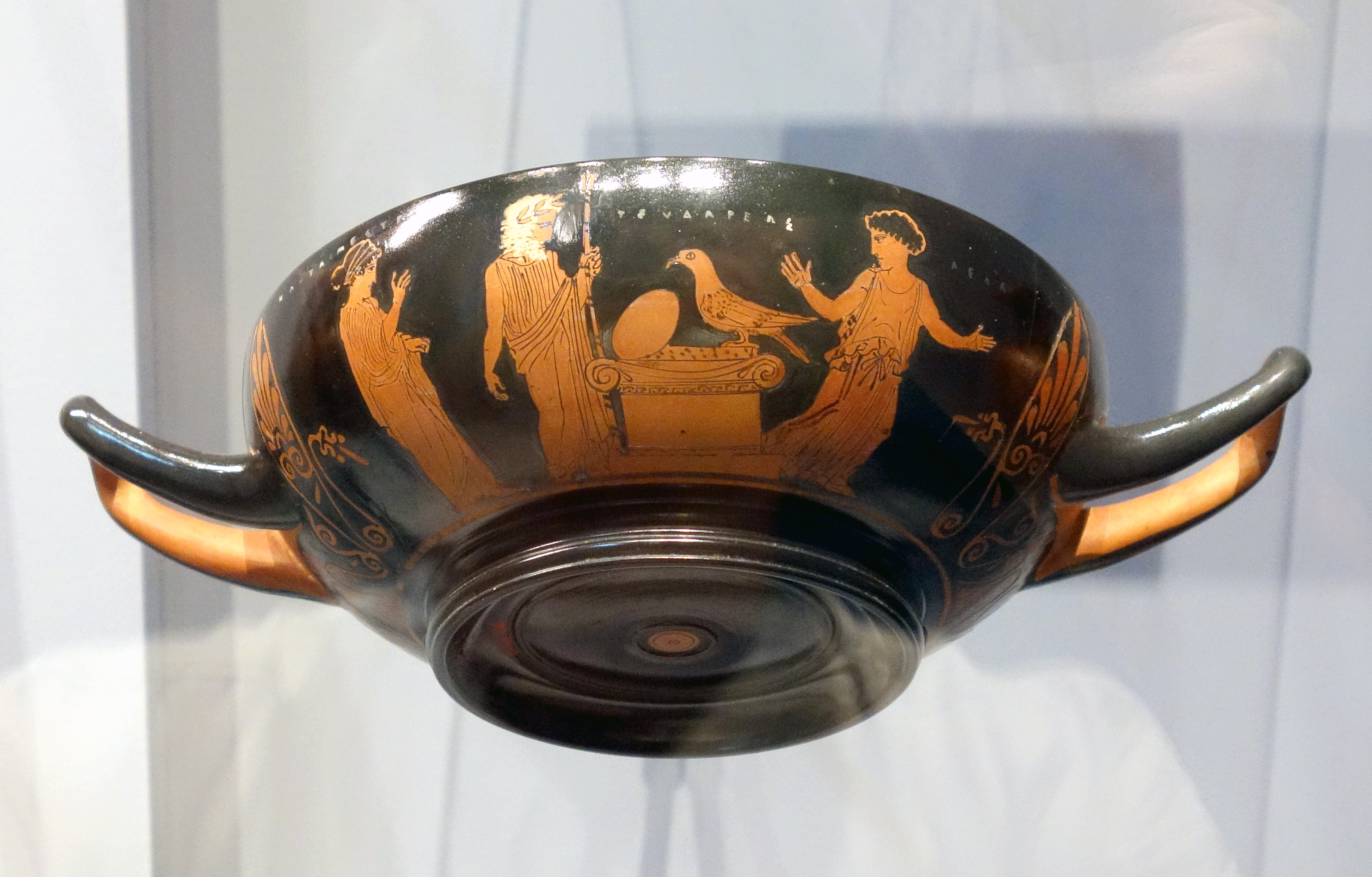
The birth of Helen on an Athenian red-figure cup by the Xenotimos Painter, c. 430–420 BC. The egg, watched over by the eagle of Zeus, rests on an altar flanked by Tyndareus and Leda; behind Tyndareus stands Clytemnestra.

After Gaia had asked him to depopulate humankind, Zeus planned to incite a great war with the birth of a beautiful daughter. It was for this reason he conceived Helen. Alternatively, he planned the war after Helen's birth in order to grant her fame.

In most sources, including the Iliad and the Odyssey, Helen is the daughter of Zeus and of Leda, the wife of the Spartan king Tyndareus. Euripides' play Helen, written in the late 5th century BC, is the earliest source to report the most familiar account of Helen's birth: that, although her putative father was Tyndareus, she was actually Zeus' daughter. In the form of a swan, the king of gods was chased by an eagle, and sought refuge with Leda. The swan gained her affection, and the two mated. Leda then produced an egg, from which Helen emerged. The First Vatican Mythographer introduces the notion that two eggs came from the union: one containing Castor and Pollux; one with Helen and Clytemnestra. Nevertheless, the same author earlier states that Helen, Castor and Pollux were produced from a single egg. Fabius Planciades Fulgentius also states that Helen, Castor and Pollux are born from the same egg. Pseudo-Apollodorus states that Leda had intercourse with both Zeus and Tyndareus the night she conceived Helen. Although describing Helen and Clytemnestra as twins is common in modern interpretations, ancient sources do not support this as the Vatican Mythographers are the first to have Helen and Clytemnestra products of a single egg-birth.

On the other hand, in the Cypria, part of the Epic Cycle, Helen was the daughter of Zeus and the goddess Nemesis. The date of the Cypria is uncertain, but it is generally thought to preserve traditions that date back to at least the 7th century BC. In the Cypria, Nemesis did not wish to mate with Zeus. She therefore changed shape into various animals as she attempted to flee Zeus, finally becoming a goose. Zeus also transformed himself into a goose and raped Nemesis, who produced an egg from which Helen was born. Presumably, in the Cypria, this egg was somehow transferred to Leda. (Note: In the 5th century comedy "Nemesis" by Cratinus, Leda was told to sit on an egg so that it would hatch, and this is no doubt the egg that was produced by Nemesis (Cratinus fr. 115 PCG; Gantz, Early Greek Myth, ibid).) Later sources state either that it was brought to Leda by a shepherd who discovered it in a grove in Attica, or that it was dropped into her lap by Hermes.

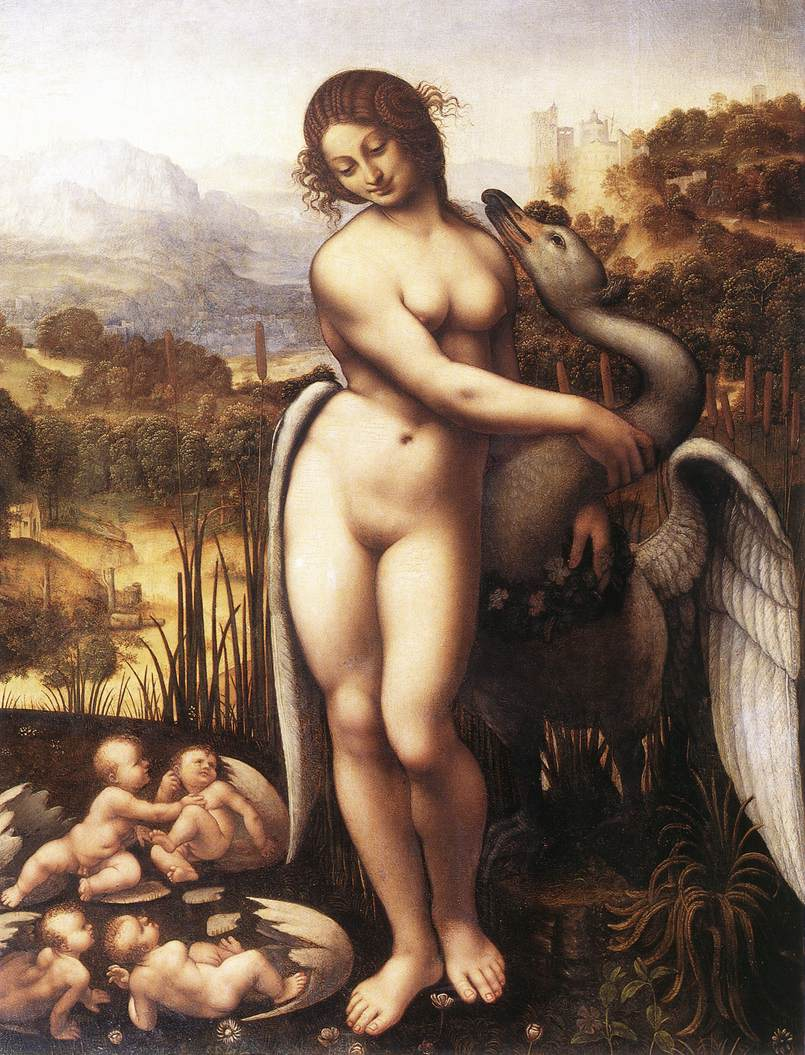
Leda and the Swan by Cesare da Sesto (c. 1506–1510, Wilton). The artist has been intrigued by the idea of Helen's unconventional birth; she and Clytemnestra are shown emerging from one egg; Castor and Pollux from another.

Asclepiades of Tragilos and Pseudo-Eratosthenes related a similar story, except that Zeus and Nemesis became swans instead of geese. Timothy Gantz has suggested that the tradition that Zeus came to Leda in the form of a swan derives from the version in which Zeus and Nemesis transformed into birds.

Pausanias states that in the middle of the 2nd century AD, the remains of an egg-shell, tied up in ribbons, were still suspended from the roof of a temple on the Spartan acropolis. People believed that this was "the famous egg that legend says Leda brought forth". Pausanias traveled to Sparta to visit the sanctuary, dedicated to Hilaeira and Phoebe, in order to see the relic for himself.

Pausanias also says that there was a local tradition that Helen's brothers, "the Dioscuri" (i.e. Castor and Pollux), were born on the island of Pefnos, adding that the Spartan poet Alcman also said this, while the poet Lycophron's use of the adjective "Pephnaian" (Πεφναίας) in association with Helen, suggests that Lycophron may have known a tradition which held that Helen was also born on the island.

=== Youthful abduction by Theseus ===
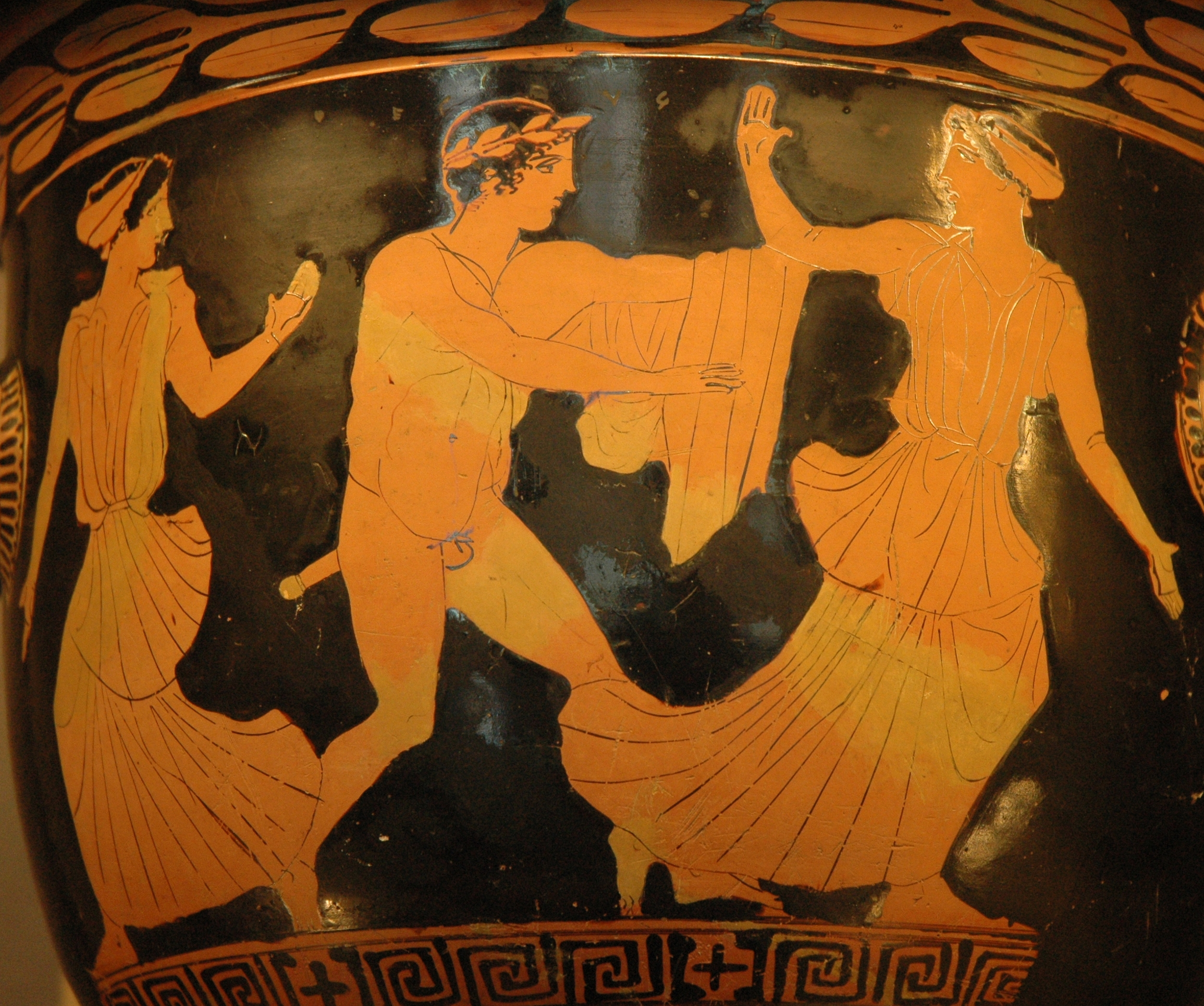
Theseus pursuing a woman, probably Helen. Side A from an Attic red-figure bell-krater, c. 440–430 BC (Louvre, Paris).

Two Athenians, Theseus and Pirithous, thought that since they were sons of gods, they should have divine wives; they thus pledged to help each other abduct two daughters of Zeus. Theseus chose Helen, and Pirithous vowed to marry Persephone, the wife of Hades. Theseus took Helen and left her with his mother Aethra or his associate Aphidnus at Aphidnae or Athens. Theseus and Pirithous then traveled to the underworld, the domain of Hades, to kidnap Persephone. Hades pretended to offer them hospitality and set a feast, but, as soon as the pair sat down, snakes coiled around their feet and held them there. Helen's abduction caused an invasion of Athens by Castor and Pollux, who captured Aethra in revenge, and returned their sister to Sparta.

In most accounts of this event, Helen was quite young; Hellanicus of Lesbos said she was seven years old and Diodorus makes her ten years old. On the other hand, Stesichorus said that Iphigenia was the daughter of Theseus and Helen, which implies that Helen was of childbearing age. In most sources, Iphigenia is the daughter of Agamemnon and Clytemnestra, but Duris of Samos and other writers, such as Antoninus Liberalis, followed Stesichorus' account.

Ovid's Heroides give us an idea of how ancient and, in particular, Roman authors imagined Helen in her youth: she is presented as a young princess wrestling naked in the palaestra, alluding to a part of girls' physical education in classical (not Mycenaean) Sparta. Sextus Propertius imagines Helen as a girl who practices arms and hunts with her brothers:

[...] or like Helen, on the sands of Eurotas, between Castor and Pollux, one to be victor in boxing, the other with horses: with naked breasts she carried weapons, they say, and did not blush with her divine brothers there.

=== Suitors ===
When it was time for Helen to marry, many kings and princes from around the world came to seek her hand, bringing rich gifts with them or sent emissaries to do so on their behalf. During the contest, Castor and Pollux had a prominent role in dealing with the suitors, although the final decision was in the hands of Tyndareus. Menelaus, her future husband, did not attend but sent his brother, Agamemnon, to represent him. He was chosen as he had the most wealth.

=== Oath of Tyndareus ===
Tyndareus was afraid to select a husband for his daughter, or send any of the suitors away, for fear of offending them and giving grounds for a quarrel. Odysseus was one of the suitors, but had brought no gifts because he believed he had little chance to win the contest. He thus promised to solve the problem, if Tyndareus in turn would support him in his courting of Penelope, the daughter of Icarius. Tyndareus readily agreed, and Odysseus proposed that, before the decision was made, all the suitors should swear a most solemn oath to defend the chosen husband against whoever should quarrel with him. After the suitors had sworn not to retaliate, Menelaus was chosen to be Helen's husband because he was the "greatest in possessions" and had offered the most gifts. As a sign of the importance of the pact, Tyndareus sacrificed a horse. Helen and Menelaus became rulers of Sparta, after Tyndareus and Leda abdicated. Menelaus and Helen rule in Sparta for at least ten years; they have a daughter, Hermione, and (according to some myths) three sons: Aethiolas, Maraphius, and Pleisthenes.

The marriage of Helen and Menelaus marks the beginning of the end of the age of heroes. Concluding the catalog of Helen's suitors, Hesiod reports Zeus' plan to obliterate the race of men and the heroes in particular. The Trojan War, caused by Helen's elopement with Paris, is going to be his means to this end.

=== Marriage with Paris ===
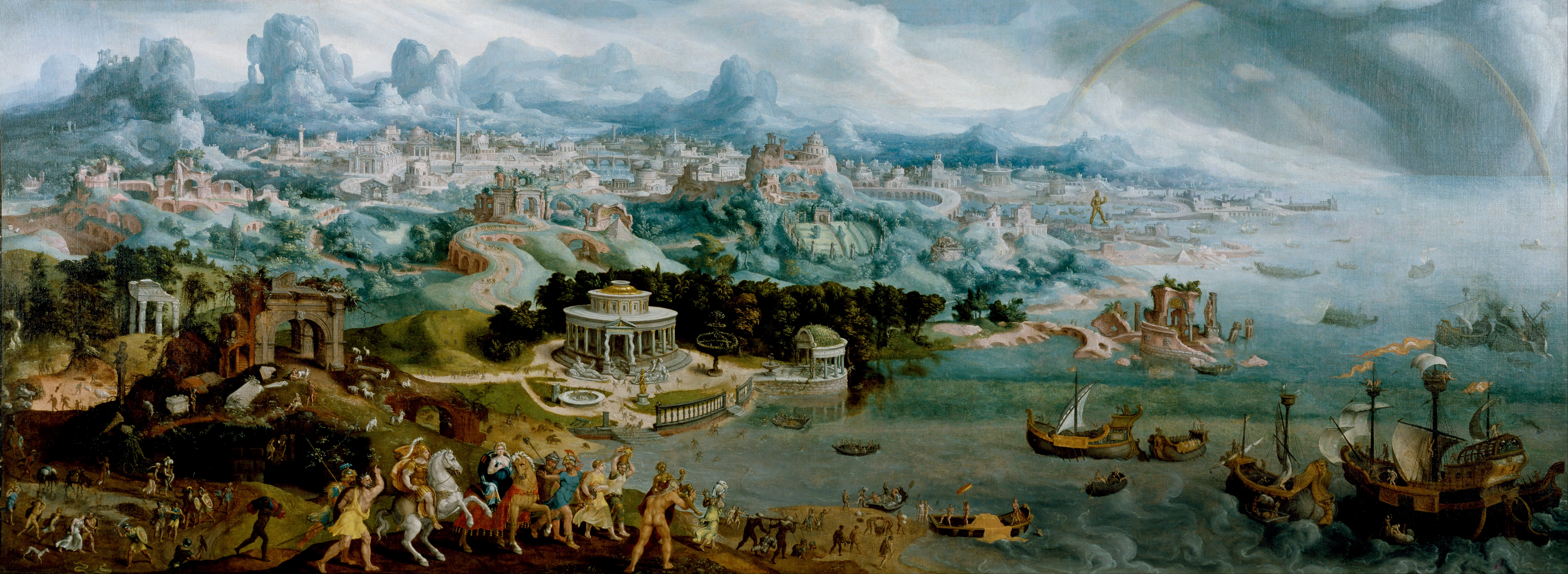
Maarten van Heemskerck painting of Paris and the Trojans fleeing Sparta with Helen among their spoils. Walters Art Museum.

Paris, a Trojan prince, came to Sparta to claim Helen, in the guise of a supposed diplomatic mission. Before this journey, Paris had been appointed by Zeus to judge the most beautiful goddess; Hera, Athena, or Aphrodite. In order to earn his favour, Aphrodite promised Paris the most beautiful woman in the world as his wife. Swayed by Aphrodite's offer, Paris chose her as the most beautiful of the goddesses, earning the wrath of Athena and Hera.

Although Helen is sometimes depicted as being forcibly abducted by Paris, most Ancient Greek sources, following Homer, believed that Helen fell in love with the Trojan prince and went to Troy willingly. According to Homer, Helen herself says that she followed Paris, or that she was led to Troy by Aphrodite. Hesiod claims she "deserted" and "dishonoured couch of golden-haired Menelaus." Herodotus recounts Paris carrying Helen off, later claiming he "excited her passion" (literally, "gave wings to her"). The Cypria simply mentions that after Paris had given Helen gifts, Aphrodite brought the prince of Troy and Spartan queen together. Apollodorus wrote that Paris persuaded Helen to leave with him, and Sappho argued that Helen chose to leave behind Menelaus and their daughter, Hermione, to be with Paris:

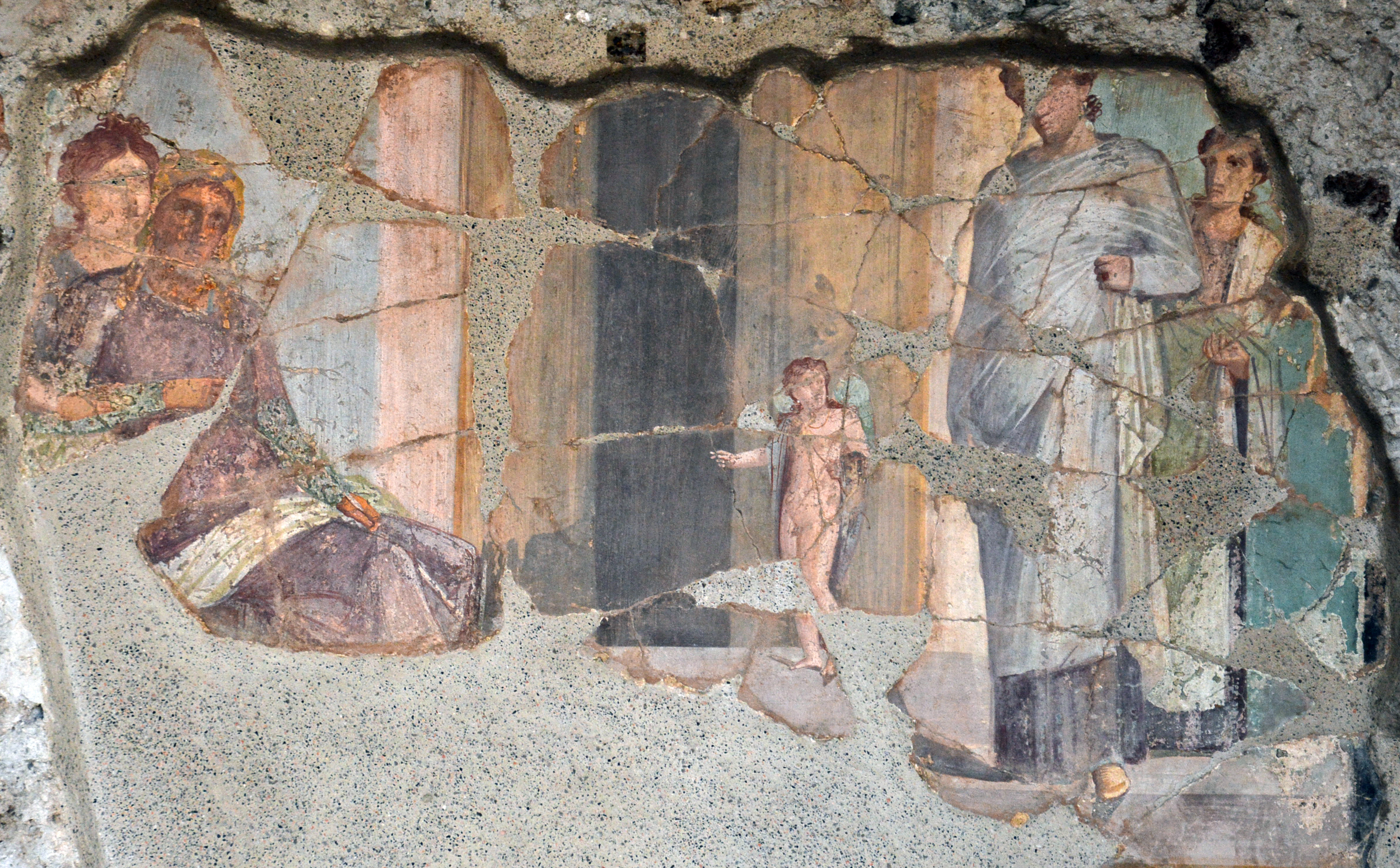
Meeting between Paris and Helen. Antique fresco in Pompeii, the House of the Golden Cupids

Some say a massing of chariots and their drivers, some say of foot soldiers, some say of ships, if you think of everything that exists on the surface of this black earth, is the most beautiful thing of them all. But I say it is that one thing that anyone passionately loves. It’s really quite easy to make this understandable to everyone, this thing. You see, that woman who was by far supreme in beauty among all humans, Helen, she […] her best of all husbands, him she left behind and sailed to Troy, caring not about her daughter and her dear parents, not caring at all. She was swept along...

— Sappho, fragment 16

Dio Chrysostom gives a completely different account of the story, questioning Homer's credibility. After Agamemnon had married Helen's sister, Clytemnestra, Tyndareus sought Helen's hand for Menelaus for political reasons. However, Helen was sought by many suitors, who came from far and near, among them Paris who surpassed all the others and won the favor of Tyndareus and his sons. Thus he won her fairly and took her away to Troy, with the full consent of her natural protectors. The Cypria narrates that in just three days Paris and Helen reached Troy. Homer narrates that during a brief stop-over in the small island of Cranae, according to Iliad, the two lovers consummated their passion. On the other hand, the Cypria notes that this happened the night before they left Sparta.

The two were married after their arrival into Troy.

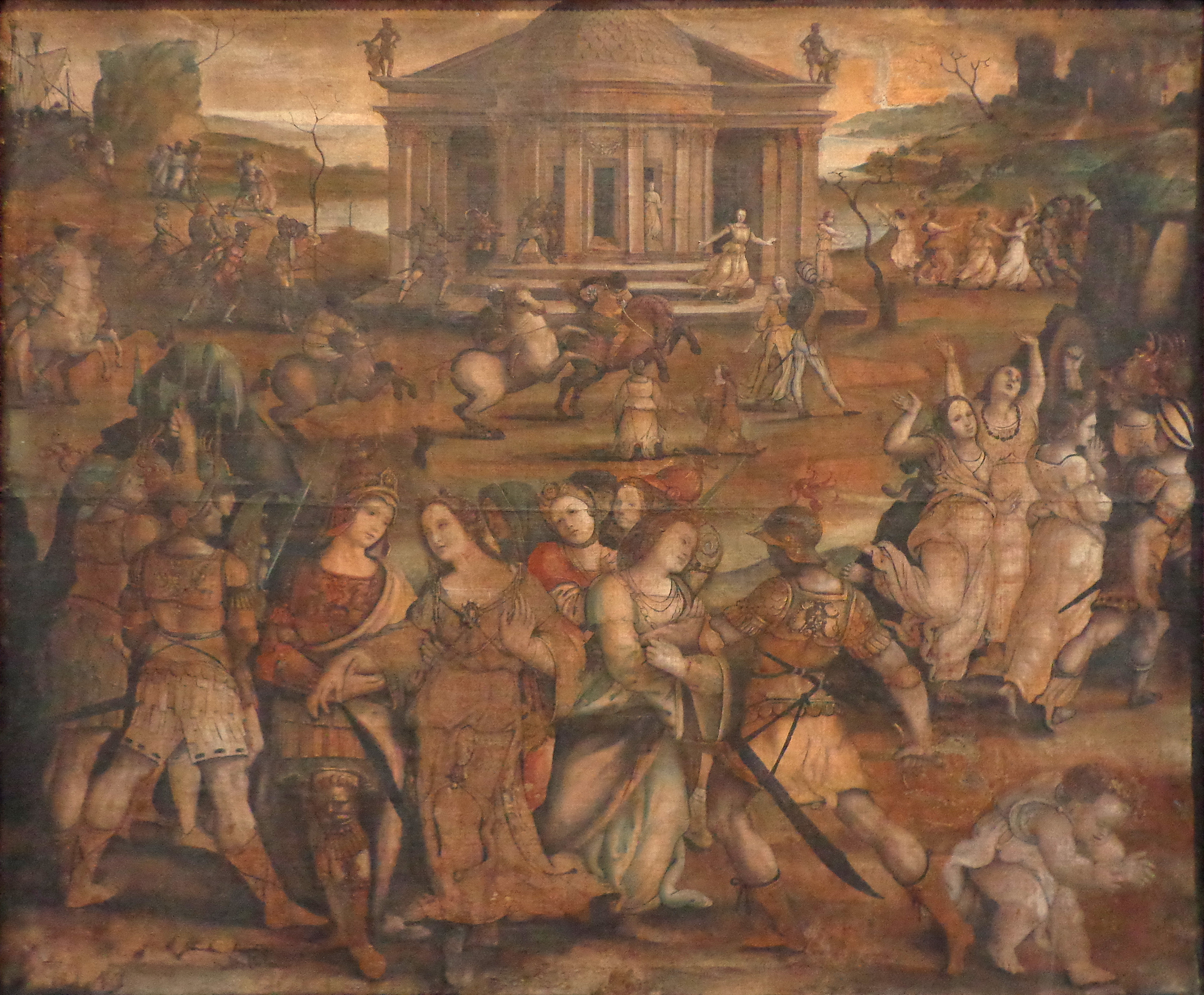
The Abduction of Helen, painting by Girolamo Genga, circa 1510 (Musée des Beaux-Arts de Strasbourg).

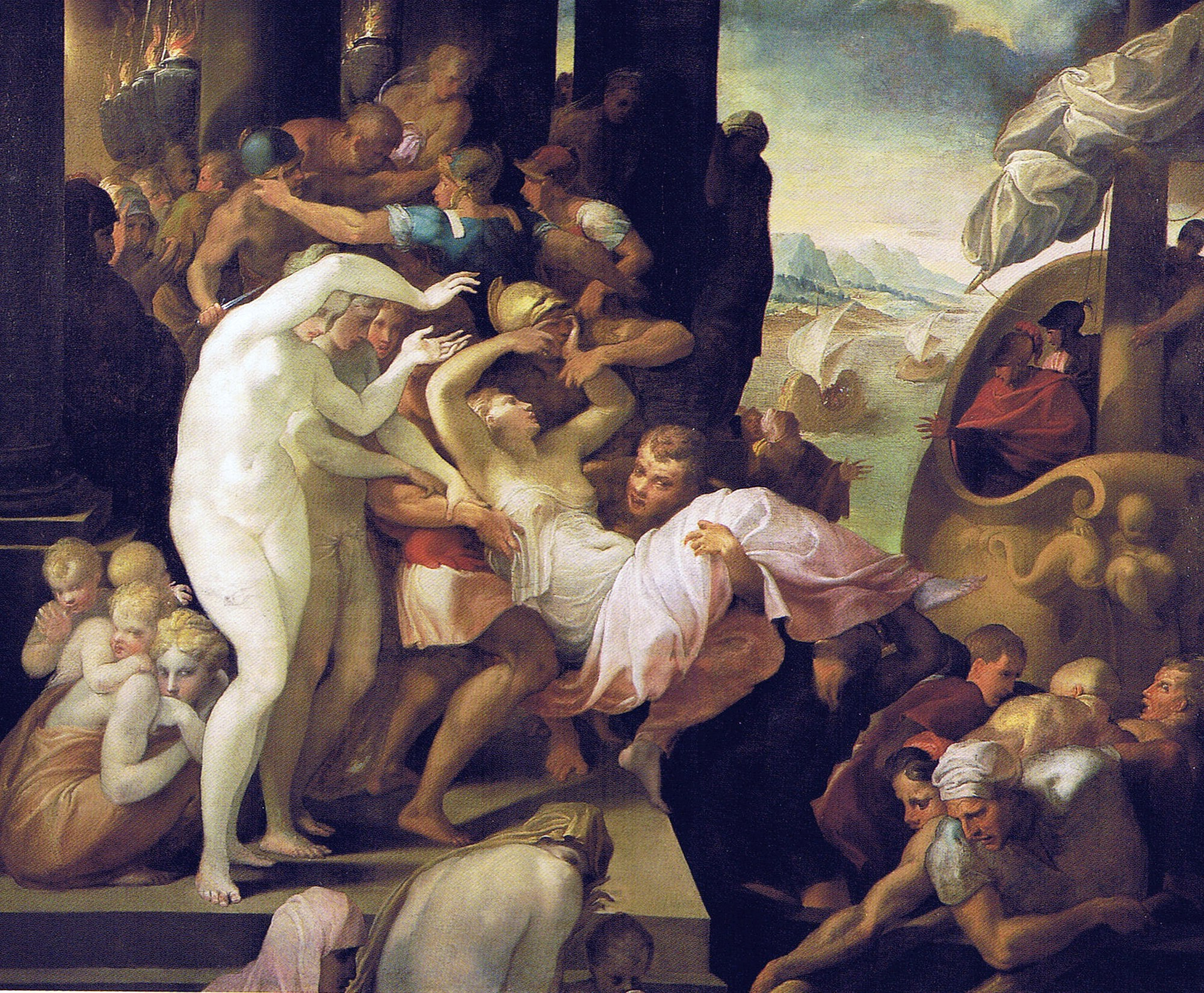
In western painting, Helen's journey to Troy is usually depicted as a forced abduction. The Rape of Helen by Francesco Primaticcio (c. 1530–1539, Bowes Museum) is representative of this tradition.

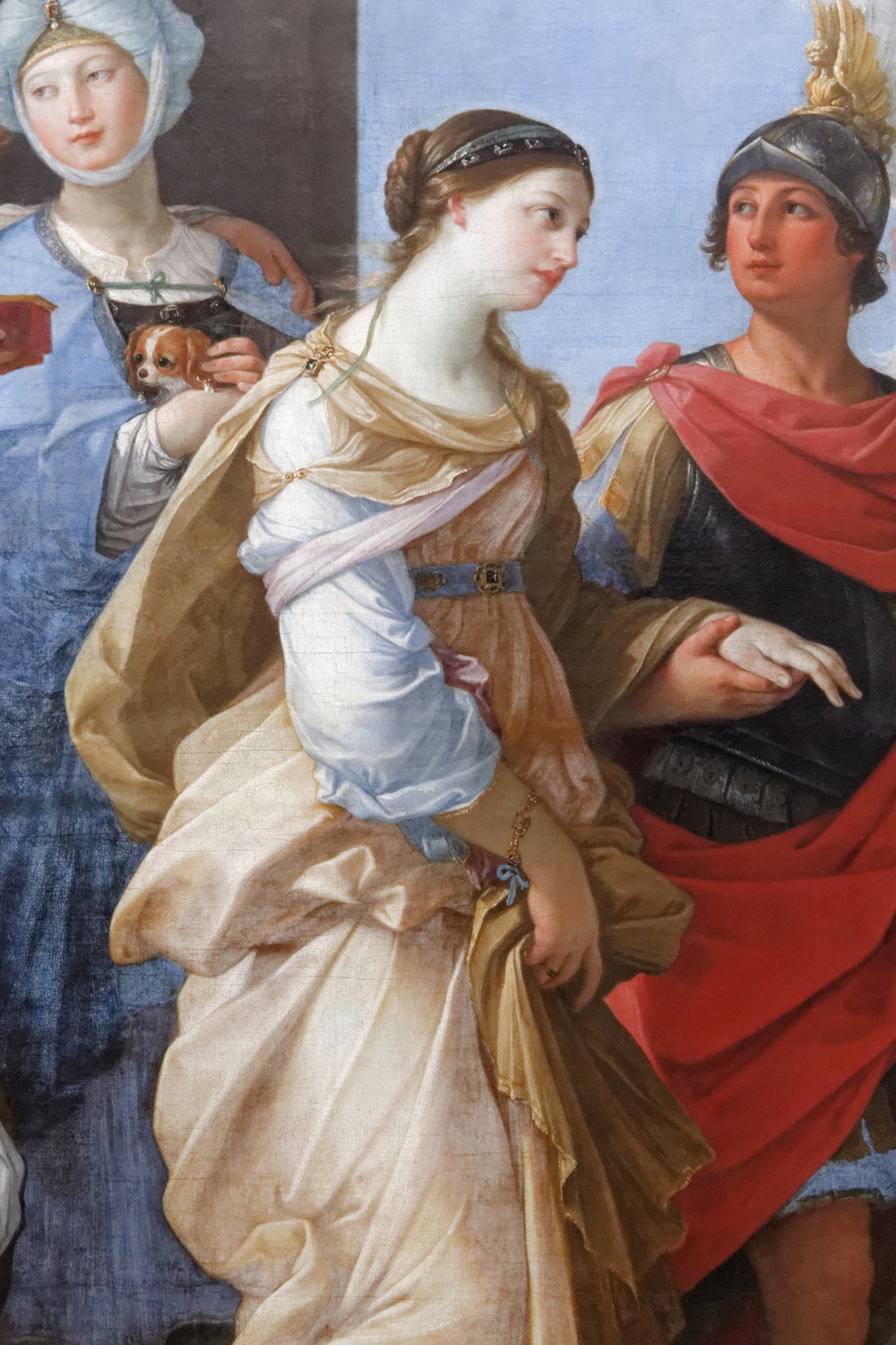
In Guido Reni's painting (1631, Louvre, Paris), however, Paris holds Helen by her wrist (as he already did in Genga's painting shown here on the left), and they leave together for Troy.

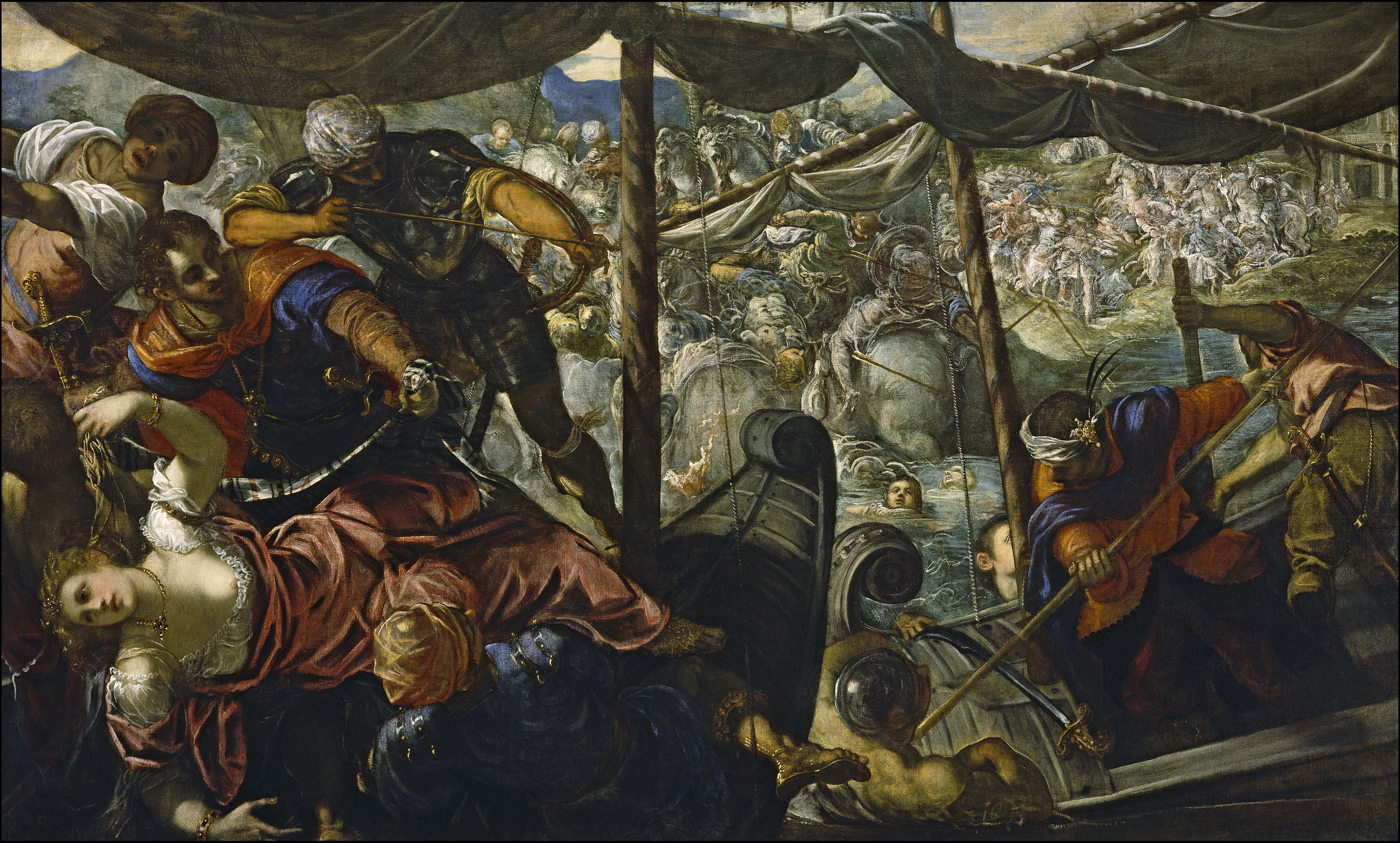
The Rape of Helen by Tintoretto (1578–1579, Museo del Prado, Madrid); Helen languishes in the corner of a land-sea battle scene.

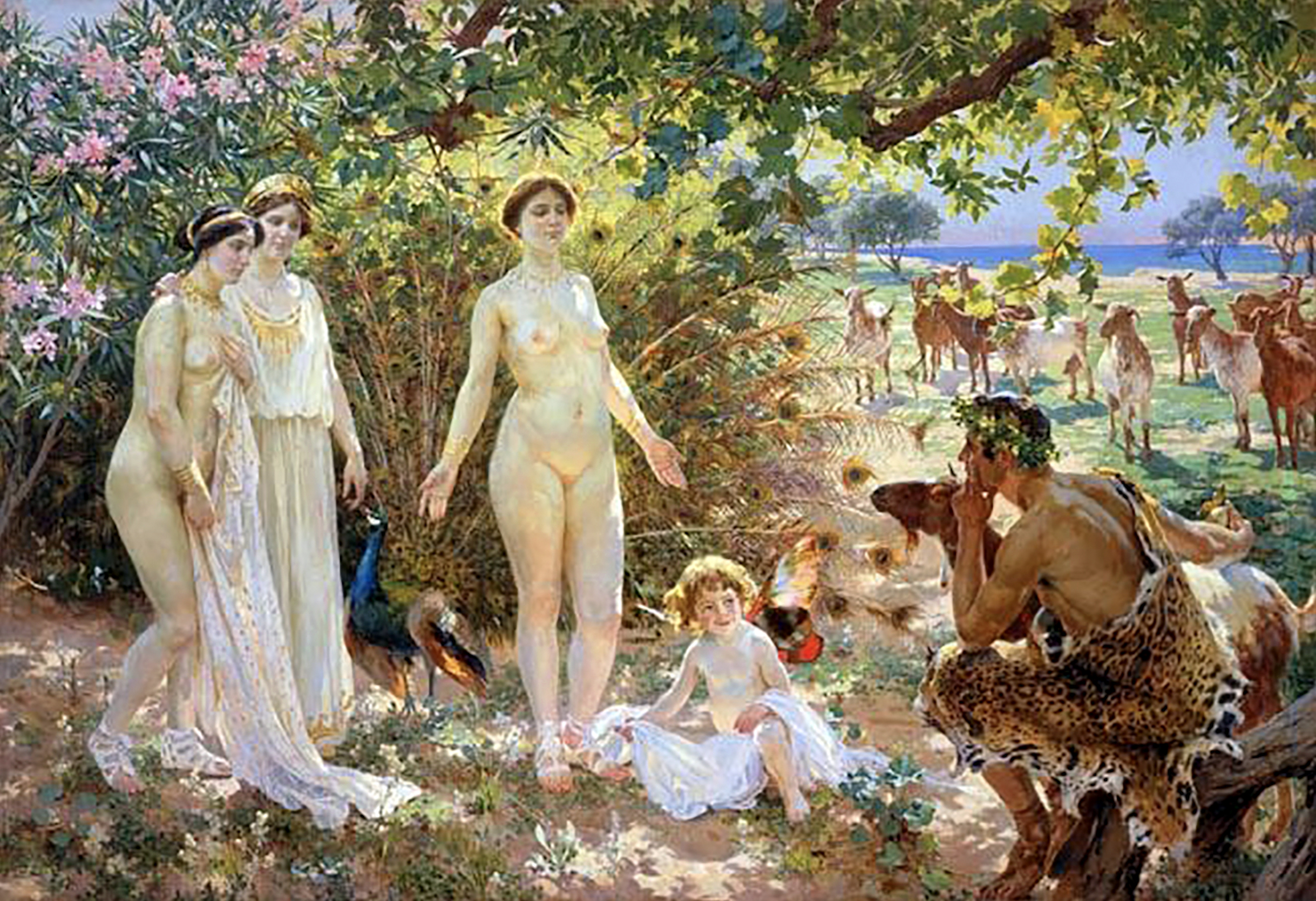
El Juicio de Paris by Enrique Simonet, c. 1904. This painting depicts Paris' judgement. He is inspecting Aphrodite, who is standing naked before him. Hera and Athena watch nearby.

In her book Helen of Troy: Myth, Beauty, Devastation, Ruby Blondell posits, "Though [Helen's] departure is typically referred to as an 'abduction', none of our sources claims that Paris took Helen by force against her will. Her complicity is essential to her story."

=== In Egypt ===
At least three Ancient Greek authors denied that Helen ever went to Troy; instead, they suggested, Helen stayed in Egypt during the Trojan War. Those three authors are Euripides, Stesichorus, and Herodotus. In the version put forth by Euripides in his play Helen, Hera fashioned a likeness (eidolon, εἴδωλον) of Helen out of clouds at Zeus' request, Hermes took her to Egypt, and Helen never went to Troy, but instead spent the entire war in Egypt. An eidolon is also present in Stesichorus' account, but not in Herodotus' rationalizing version of the myth. In addition to these accounts, the scholiast to Lycophron's Alexandra states that Hesiod was the first to mention Helen's eidolon. This may mean Hesiod stated this in a literary work, or that the idea was widely known/circulated in early archaic Greece during the time of Hesiod and was consequently attributed to him.

Herodotus adds weight to the "Egyptian" version of events by putting forward his own evidence—he traveled to Egypt and interviewed the priests of the temple (Foreign Aphrodite, ξείνη Ἀφροδίτη) at Memphis. According to these priests, Helen had arrived in Egypt shortly after leaving Sparta, because strong winds had blown Paris's ship off course. King Proteus of Egypt, appalled that Paris had seduced his host's wife and plundered his host's home in Sparta, disallowed Paris from taking Helen to Troy. Paris returned to Troy without a new bride, but the Greeks refused to believe that Helen was in Egypt and not within Troy's walls. Thus, Helen waited in Memphis for ten years, while the Greeks and the Trojans fought. Following the conclusion of the Trojan War, Menelaus sailed to Memphis, where Proteus reunited him with Helen. Upon trying to leave Egypt, hostile winds kept their ships grounded. In response, Menelaus sacrificed two Egyptian children and returned to Sparta.

=== In Troy ===
When he discovered that his wife was missing, Menelaus called upon all the other suitors to fulfill their oaths, thus beginning the Trojan War.

The Greek fleet gathered in Aulis, but the ships could not sail for lack of wind. Artemis was enraged by a sacrilege, and only the sacrifice of Agamemnon's daughter, Iphigenia, could appease her. In Euripides Iphigenia in Aulis, Clytemnestra, Iphigenia's mother and Helen's sister, begs her husband to reconsider his decision, calling Helen a "wicked woman". Clytemnestra tries to warn Agamemnon that sacrificing Iphigenia for Helen's sake is, "buying what we most detest with what we hold most dear". However, Agamemnon went through with the act; the winds turned, and the fleet set sail for Troy.

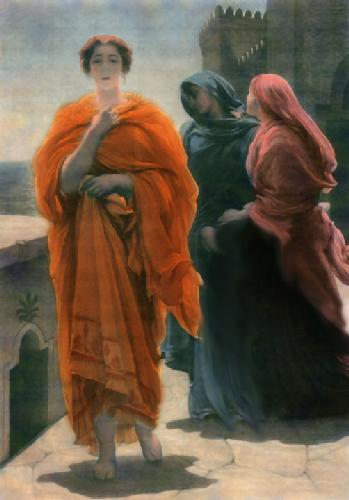
Helen on the Ramparts of Troy was a popular theme in late 19th-century art – seen here a depiction by Frederick Leighton.

In a similar fashion to Leighton, Gustave Moreau depicts an expressionless Helen; a blank or anguished face.

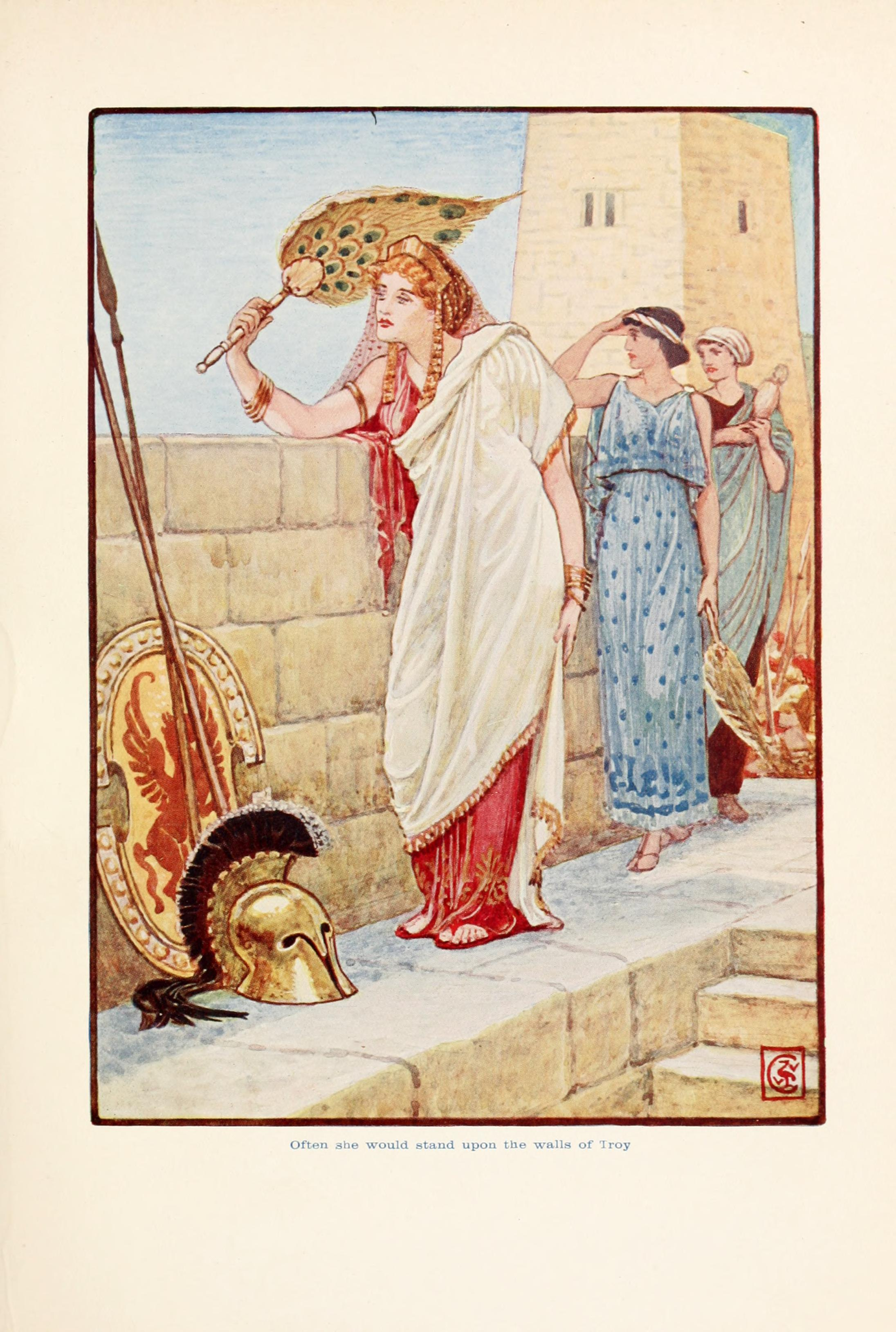
Lithographic illustration by Walter Crane

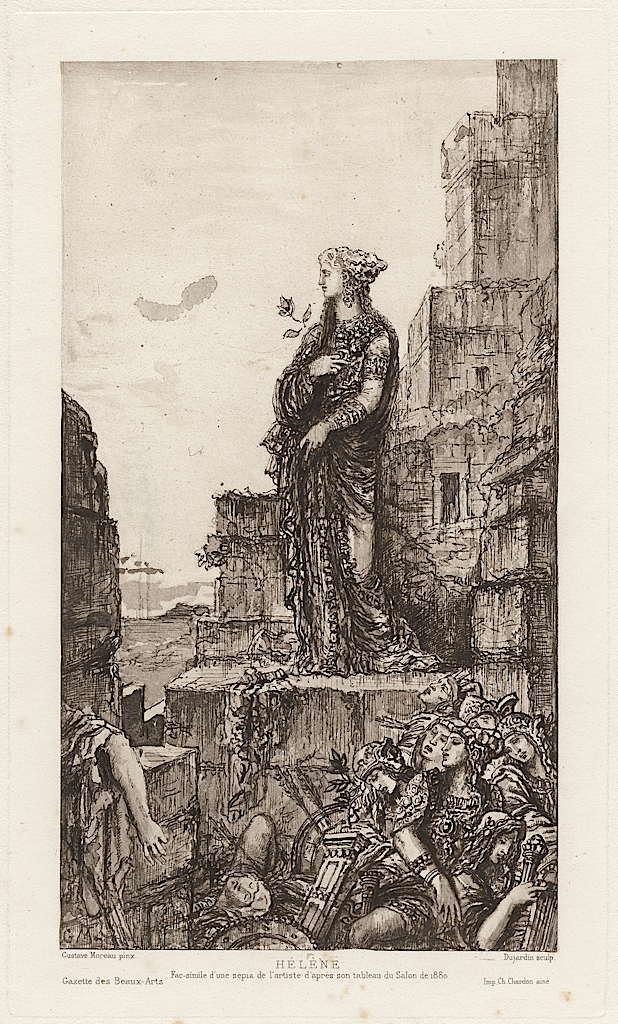
Paul Dujardin after Gustave Moreau, Hélène, photogravure, 1880

Before the opening of hostilities, the Greeks dispatched a delegation to the Trojans under Odysseus and Menelaus; they endeavored without success to persuade Priam to hand Helen back. A popular theme, The Request of Helen (Helenes Apaitesis, Ἑλένης Ἀπαίτησις), was the subject of a drama by Sophocles, now lost. (Note: Ancient writers do not agree on whether the embassy was dispatched before the gathering of the Greek army in Aulis or after it reached Tenedos or Troia. In Herodotus' account the Trojans swore to the Greek envoys that Helen was in Egypt, not in Troy; but the Greeks did not believe them, and laid siege to the city, until they took it. Cypria. fr. 1. Herodotus. Histories. II, 118: 2–4. Homer. Iliad. III, 205. Pseudo-Appolodorus. Epitome. 28–29.)

Dictys Cretensis provides the fullest narration of the embassy. When Helen arrived at Troy, she burst into tears and begged the Trojans not to return her. The next day, Menelaus arrived with his fellow envoys and demanded her return. Priam again asked Helen for her decision, who replied she wished to stay and had not left unwillingly.

Homer paints a poignant, lonely picture of Helen in Troy. She is filled with self-loathing and regret for what she has caused; by the end of the war, the Trojans have come to hate her. When Hector dies, she is the third mourner at his funeral, and she says that, of all the Trojans, Hector and Priam alone were always kind to her:

Wherefore I wail alike for thee and for my hapless self with grief at heart;
for no longer have I anyone beside in broad Troy that is gentle to me or kind;
but all men shudder at me.

These bitter words reveal that Helen gradually realized Paris' weaknesses, and decided to ally herself with Hector. There is an affectionate relationship between the two, and Helen has harsh words for Paris when she compares the two brothers:

Howbeit, seeing the gods thus ordained these ills,
would that I had been wife to a better man,
that could feel the indignation of his fellows and their many revilings. [...]
But come now, enter in, and sit thee upon this chair, my brother,
since above all others has trouble encompassed thy heart
because of shameless me, and the folly of Alexander.

After Paris was killed in combat, there was some dispute among the Trojans about which of Priam's surviving sons she should remarry: Helenus or Deiphobus, but she was given to the latter.

=== During the Fall of Troy ===
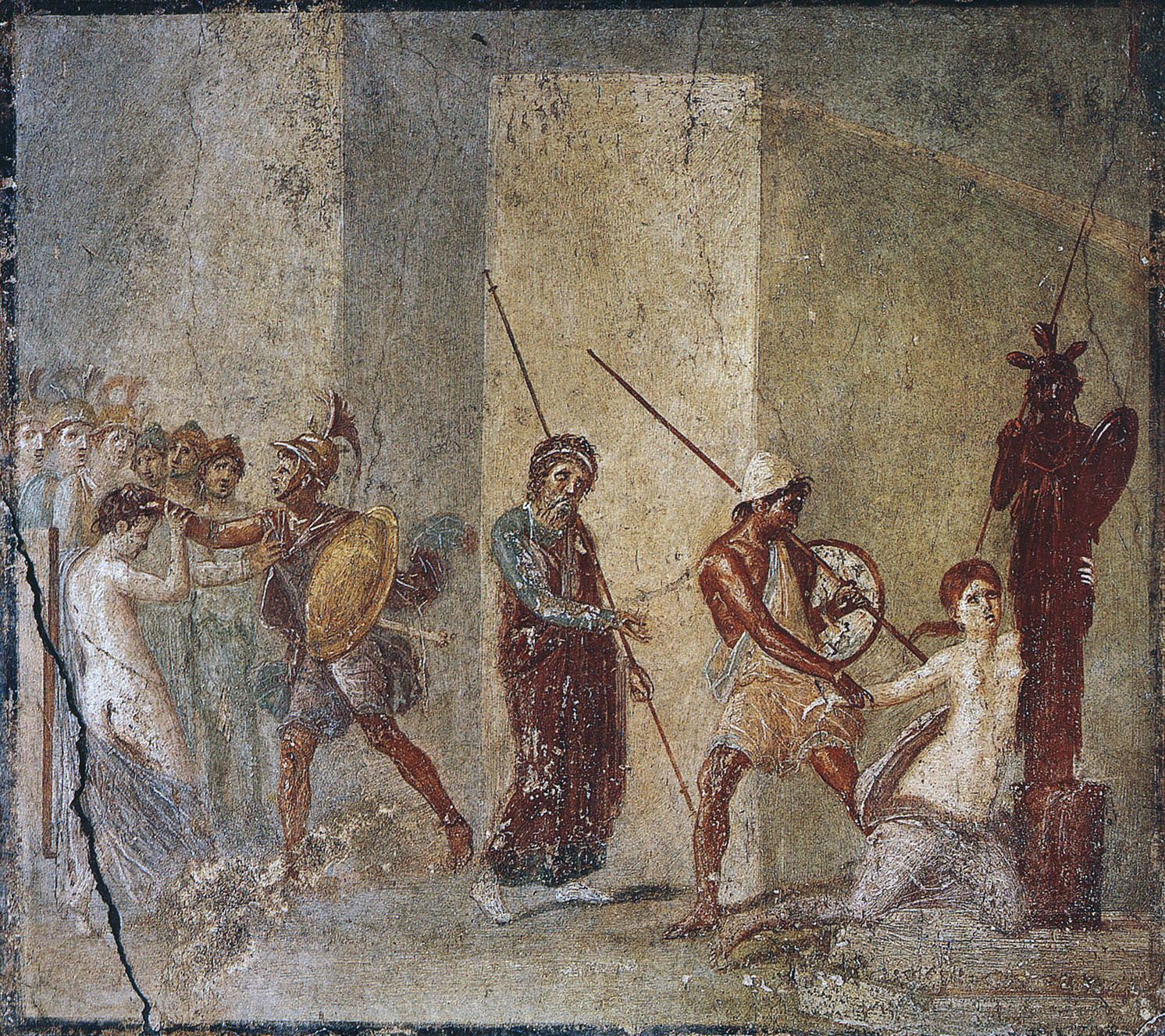
Menelaus captures Helen in Troy, Ajax the Lesser drags Cassandra from Palladium before eyes of Priam, fresco from the Casa del Menandro, Pompeii

In the Odyssey, Helen recounts how she recognized Ulysses disguised as a beggar, and bathed, anointed and clothed him, without exposing him. He told her about the Greek plans, and she was happy, because she was no longer under the power of Aphrodite, and longed to return home to Sparta and be reunited with her first husband and her daughter. Menelaus affirmed her words, then recounted how she arrived with Deiphobus and circled the horse three times, calling out the captains' names in the voices of their wives, and him and others were about to respond, but Ulysses stopped them. In Virgil's Aeneid, Deiphobus gives an account of Helen's treacherous stance: when the Trojan Horse was admitted into the city, she feigned Bacchic rites, leading a chorus of Trojan women, and, holding a torch among them, she signaled to the Greeks from the city's central tower.

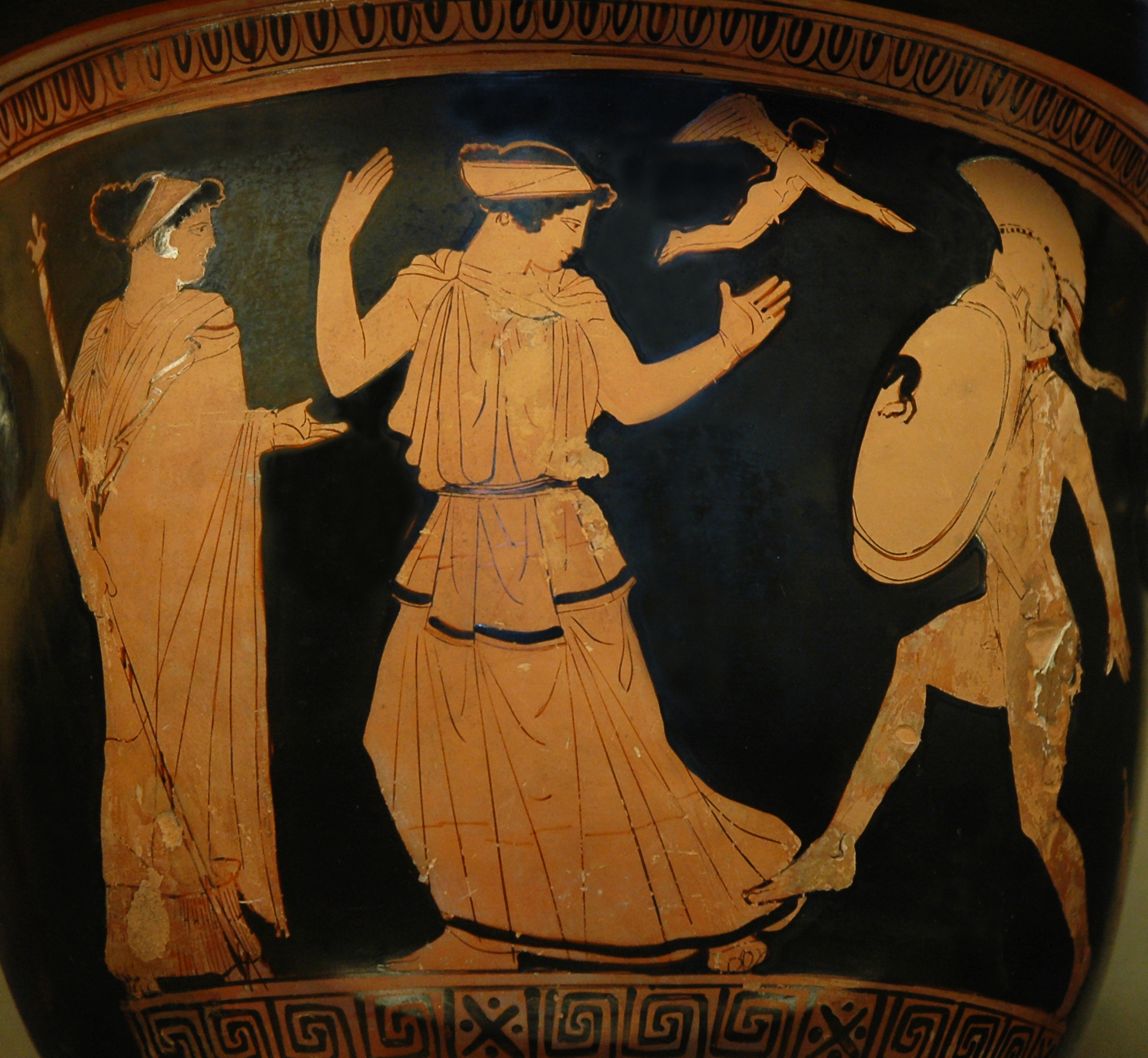
Menelaus intends to strike Helen; struck by her beauty, he drops his sword. A flying Eros and Aphrodite (on the left) watch the scene. Detail from Attic red-figure krater, 450–440 BC.

After the death of Paris, Helen was fought over by the Trojan princes and taken by Paris' younger brother, Deiphobus. According to Vergil, when the sack of Troy began, she hid her new husband's sword, and signaled the Greeks to his bedroom, leaving him to the mercy of Menelaus and Odysseus. Aeneas meets the mutilated Deiphobus in Hades; his wounds serve as a testimony to his ignominious end.

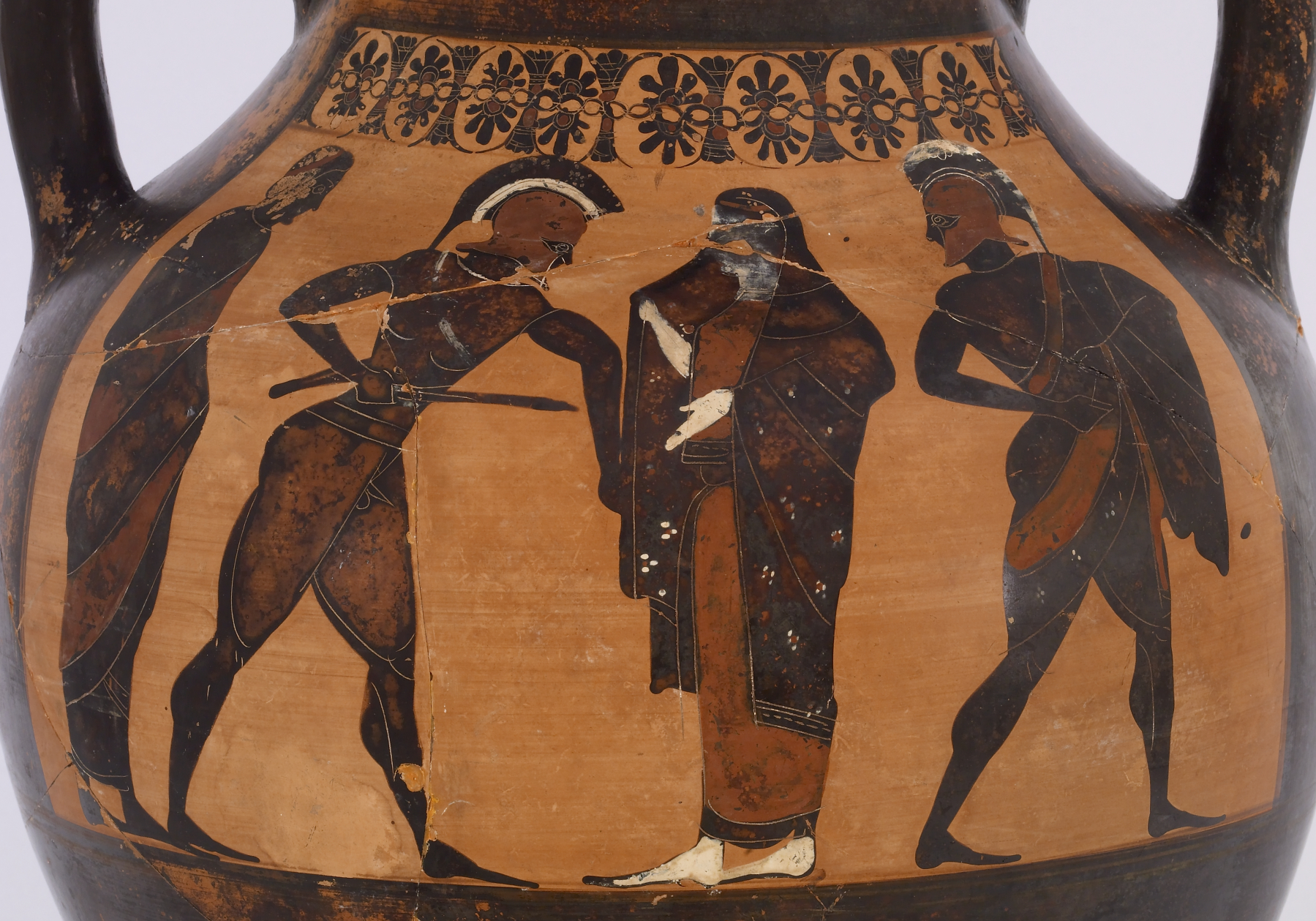
A warrior draws his sword on a modestly veiled woman in the presence of two onlookers; this scene has been identified as Menelaus' recovery of Helen after the capture of Troy. Detail from black-figure belly amphora attributed to Exekias, 540–530 BC.

In Quintus Smyrnaeus' account, when Menelaus found Helen, he intended to strike her down with his sword, but Aphrodite knocked it out of his hand. She calmed him down, stirring desire in him, and he remembered their early love and spared Helen's life. Her beauty also stunned the Greek soldiers, who instead of demanding her death, couldn't bring themselves to harm her. She and Menelaus reconciled.

In other sources, she dropped her robe from her shoulders, and the sight of her breasts caused Menelaus to let go of his sword. Euripides' Electra wails:

Alas for my troubles! Can it be that her beauty has blunted their swords?

Stesichorus wrote that both the Greeks and Trojans gathered to stone Helen to death. When they saw her face, they too dropped their weapons.

=== Fate ===
Helen returned to Sparta and lived with Menelaus, where she was encountered by Telemachus in Book 4 of The Odyssey. She and Menelaus were seemingly reconciled — he holds no grudge at her having run away with a lover and she feels no restraint in telling anecdotes of her life at Troy. However, some suggest the scene has underlying conflict. Menelaus immediately undercuts Helen's tale of loyalty to Greece with a story of his own, where she tries to expose the soldiers hidden inside the horse.

According to another version, used by Euripides in his play Orestes, Helen had been saved by Apollo from Orestes and was taken up to Mount Olympus almost immediately after Menelaus' return. She was then made a sea goddess who watches over sailors alongside her brothers, Castor and Pollux. Her brothers' stars helped sailors, whilst her star was considered dangerous. Certain sources record how it could burn up a ship.

A curious fate is recounted by Pausanias (3.19.11–13), which has Helen share the afterlife with Achilles.

Pausanias recorded a different version of Helen's ultimate fate. According to him, when Menelaus died, his sons kicked Helen out of the palace, so she went to Rhodes, where an old friend of hers, Polyxo the wife of Tlepolemus, ruled. Tlepolemus had perished during the Trojan War leaving Polyxo a widow with a young child, so unbeknownst to Helen, Polyxo deeply resented her now. She pretended to receive Helen warmly, but when the queen of Sparta relaxed in a bath, she sent handmaidens dressed up as Furies to seize Helen and hang her from a tree. Thereafter the Rhodians worshipped her as Helen of the Tree (Helene Dendritis). There are other traditions concerning the punishment of Helen. For example, she is offered as a sacrifice to the gods in Tauris by Iphigeneia, or Thetis, enraged when Achilles dies because of Helen, kills her on her return journey.

In Euripides's tragedy The Trojan Women, Helen is shunned by the women who survived the war and is to be taken back to Greece to face a death sentence. This version is contradicted by two of Euripides' other tragedies, Electra, which predates The Trojan Women, and Helen, as Helen is described as being in Egypt during the events of the Trojan War in each.

== Artistic representations ==
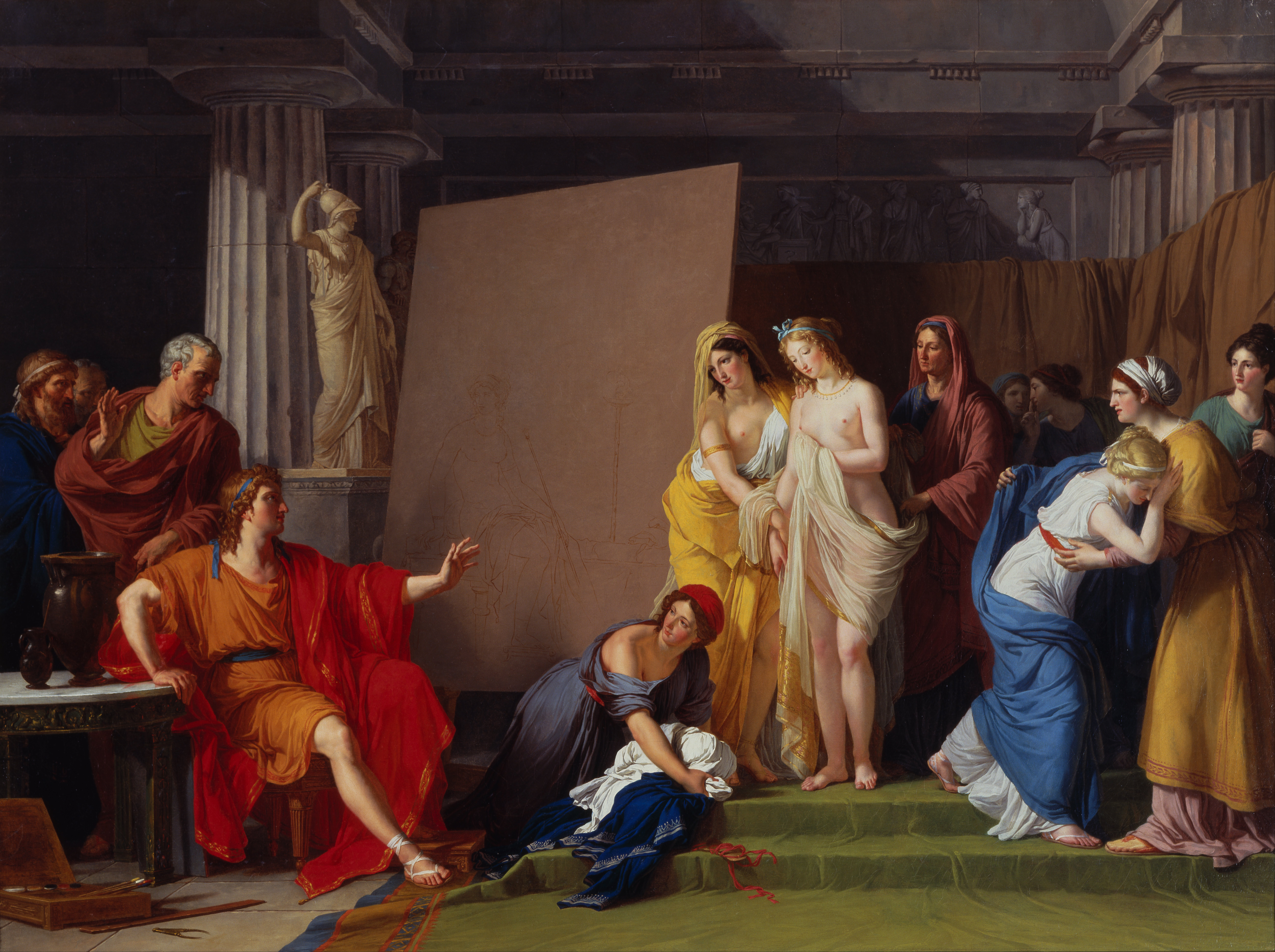
Zeuxis et les Filles de Crotone (François-André Vincent, 1789, Paris, Louvre). The scene tells the story of the painter Zeuxis who was commissioned to produce a picture of Helen for the temple of Hera at Agrigentum, Sicily. To realize his task, Zeuxis chose the five most beautiful maidens in the region.

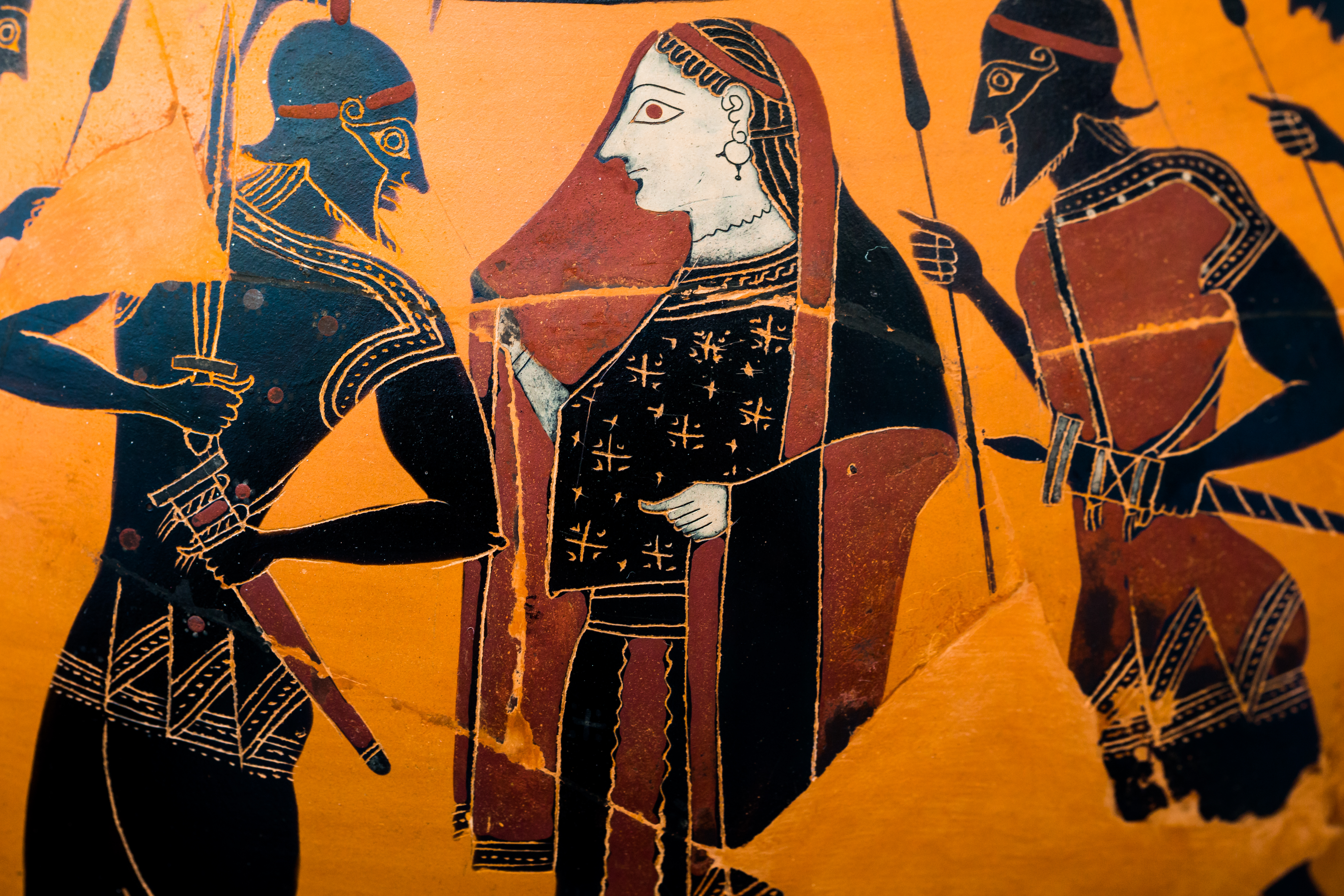
Recovery of Helen by Menelaus. Ancient Greek black-figure amphora, c. 550 BC, believed to have been made by the Amasis Painter. Homer refers to Helen as pale.

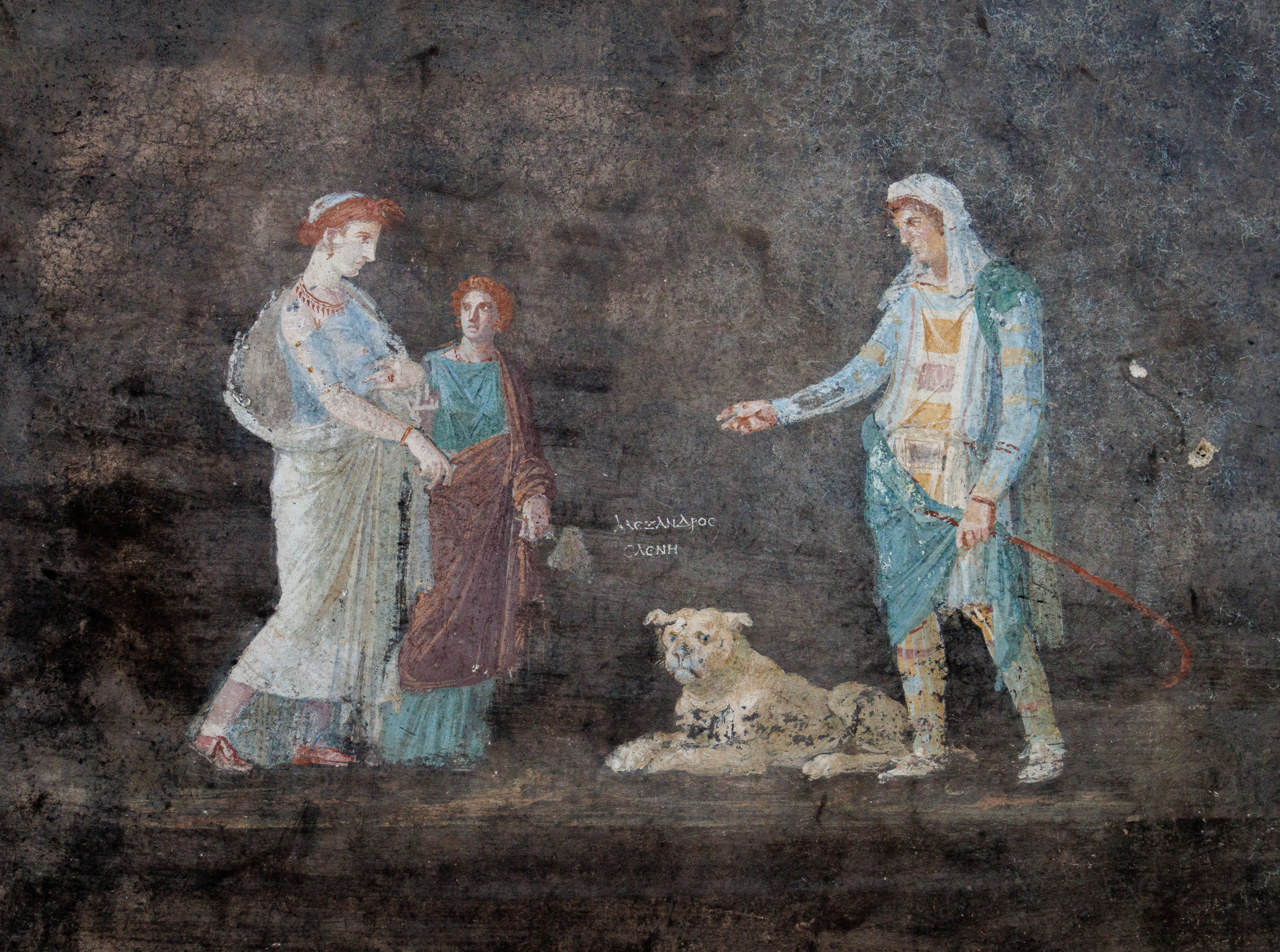
Helen (first from left) and Paris (right), ancient painting from the Black Room in Pompeii. Helen is depicted here with red hair.

From Antiquity, depicting Helen would be a remarkable challenge. The story of Zeuxis, first recorded in the 1st century AD, deals with this exact question: how would an artist immortalize ideal beauty? He eventually chose the best features from five virgins. The ancient world begins to paint Helen's picture or inscribe her form on stone, clay and bronze by the 7th century BC. Homer did not describe Helen with any specifics, except the statement she had "white" skin.

Homer described Helen as "ἠΰκομος" (eukomos), meaning "lovely-haired". Sappho called her "ξανθή" (xanthe), which is female version of word "ξανθός" (xanthos), a term referring to light-colored hair, including blond, reddish and light brown; Euripides too described her hair as having been "ξανθῆς" (xanthes). Hesiod and Quintus Smyrnaeus described her eyes as "κυάνεος" (kuaneos), which is often translated as "dark" or "dark-blue". Eleanor Irwin (1974) argued that "κυάνεος" was most likely a poetic synonym for "μέλας" (melas) and therefore denoted black or brown eyes, contrasting with "γλαυκός" (glaukos), the term used for gray or blue eyes. A later Latin account, probably from the fifth century CE, falsely attributed to Dares Phrygius, describes Helen as "beautiful, ingenuous, and charming. Her legs were the best; her mouth the cutest. There was a beauty-mark between her eyebrows". Bettany Hughes notes that Helen and other Homeric heroes tend to be described and depicted by ancient Greeks as being xanthos (light-haired), and she argues that this linked them to the gods, as light-haired individuals were less common in ancient Mediterranean than dark-haired ones.

Helen is frequently depicted on Athenian vases as being threatened by Menelaus and fleeing from him. This is not the case, however, in Laconic art: on an Archaic stele depicting Helen's recovery after the fall of Troy, Menelaus is armed with a sword but Helen faces him boldly, looking directly into his eyes; and in other works of Peloponnesian art, Helen is shown carrying a wreath, while Menelaus holds his sword aloft vertically. In contrast, on Athenian vases of c. 550–470, Menelaus threateningly points his sword at her.

The abduction by Paris was another popular motif in ancient Greek vase-painting; definitely more popular than the kidnapping by Theseus. In a famous representation by the Athenian vase painter Makron, Helen follows Paris like a bride following a bridegroom, her wrist grasped by Paris' hand. The Etruscans, who had a sophisticated knowledge of Greek mythology, demonstrated a particular interest in the theme of the delivery of Helen's egg, which is depicted in relief mirrors.

In Renaissance painting, Helen's departure from Sparta is usually depicted as a scene of forcible removal (rape) by Paris. This is not, however, the case with certain secular medieval illustrations. Artists of the 1460s and 1470s were influenced by Guido delle Colonne's Historia destructionis Troiae, where Helen's abduction was portrayed as a scene of seduction. In the Florentine Picture Chronicle Paris and Helen are shown departing arm in arm, while their marriage was depicted into Franco-Flemish tapestry.

In Christopher Marlowe's Doctor Faustus (1604), Faust conjures the shade of Helen. Upon seeing Helen, Faustus speaks the famous line: "Was this the face that launch'd a thousand ships, / And burnt the topless towers of Ilium." (Act V, Scene I.) Helen is also conjured by Faust in Goethe's Faust.

Helen appears in Geoffrey Chaucer's epic poem Troilus and Criseyde and in William Shakespeare's play Troilus and Cressida, where Helen is a minor character who adores Troilus.

In Pre-Raphaelite art, Helen is often shown with shining curly hair and ringlets. Other painters of the same period depict Helen on the ramparts of Troy, and focus on her expression: her face is expressionless, blank, inscrutable. In Gustave Moreau's painting, Helen finally becomes faceless; a blank eidolon in the middle of Troy's ruins.

== Cult ==
The major centers of Helen's cult were in Laconia. At Sparta, the urban sanctuary of Helen was located near the Platanistas, so called for the plane trees planted there. Ancient sources associate Helen with gymnastic exercises or/and choral dances of maidens near the Evrotas River. This practice is referenced in the closing lines of Lysistrata, where Helen is said to be the "pure and proper" leader of the dancing Spartan women. Theocritus conjures the song epithalamium Spartan women sung at Platanistas commemorating the marriage of Helen and Menelaus:

We first a crown of low-growing lotus
having woven will place it on a shady plane-tree.
First from a silver oil-flask soft oil
drawing we will let it drip beneath the shady plane-tree.
Letters will be carved in the bark, so that someone passing by
may read in Doric: "Reverence me. I am Helen's tree."

Helen's worship was also present on the opposite bank of Eurotas at Therapne, where she shared a shrine with Menelaus and the Dioscuri. The shrine has been known as the Menelaion (the shrine of Menelaus), and it was believed to be the spot where Helen was buried alongside Menelaus. Despite its name, both the shrine and the cult originally belonged to Helen; Menelaus was added later as her husband. In addition, there was a festival at the town, which was called Meneleaeia (Μενελάεια) in honour of Menelaus and Helen. Isocrates writes that at Therapne Helen and Menelaus were worshiped as gods, and not as heroes. Clader argues that, if indeed Helen was worshiped as a goddess at Therapne, then her powers should be largely concerned with fertility, or as a solar deity. There is also evidence for Helen's cult in Hellenistic Sparta: rules for those sacrificing and holding feasts in their honor are extant.

Helen was also worshiped in Attica along with her brothers, and on Rhodes as Helen Dendritis (Helen of the Trees, Έλένα Δενδρῖτις); she was a vegetation or a fertility goddess. (Note: A shared cult of Helen and her brothers in Attica is alluded to in Euripides, Helen, 1666–1669. See also Edmunds, Helen's Divine Origins, 26–29. Concerning Helen Dendritis, Gumpert (Grafting Helen, 96), and Skutsch (Helen, 109) support that she was a vegetation goddess. Meagher (The Meaning of Helen, 43 f.) argues that her cult in Rhodes reflects an ancient fertility ritual associated with Helen not only on Rhodes but also at Dendra, near Sparta. Edmunds (Helen's Divine Origins, 18) notes that it is unclear what an ancient tree cult might be.) Martin P. Nilsson has argued that the cult in Rhodes has its roots to the Minoan, pre-Greek era, when Helen was allegedly worshiped as a vegetation goddess. Claude Calame and other scholars try to analyze the affinity between the cults of Helen and Artemis Orthia, pointing out the resemblance of the terracotta female figurines offered to both deities.

Photius writes that, according to a tradition, a place in Lacedaemon was called Sandalion (τὸ Σανδάλιον) because it was said to have been named after Helen's sandal, which fell off at that spot while she was being pursued by Paris.

The Lindos Chronicle records a dedication attributed to Helen, who is said to have dedicated a pair of bracelets at the temple of Athena at Lindos. They bore the inscription, "Helen to Athena".

== In popular culture ==
=== Early depictions ===
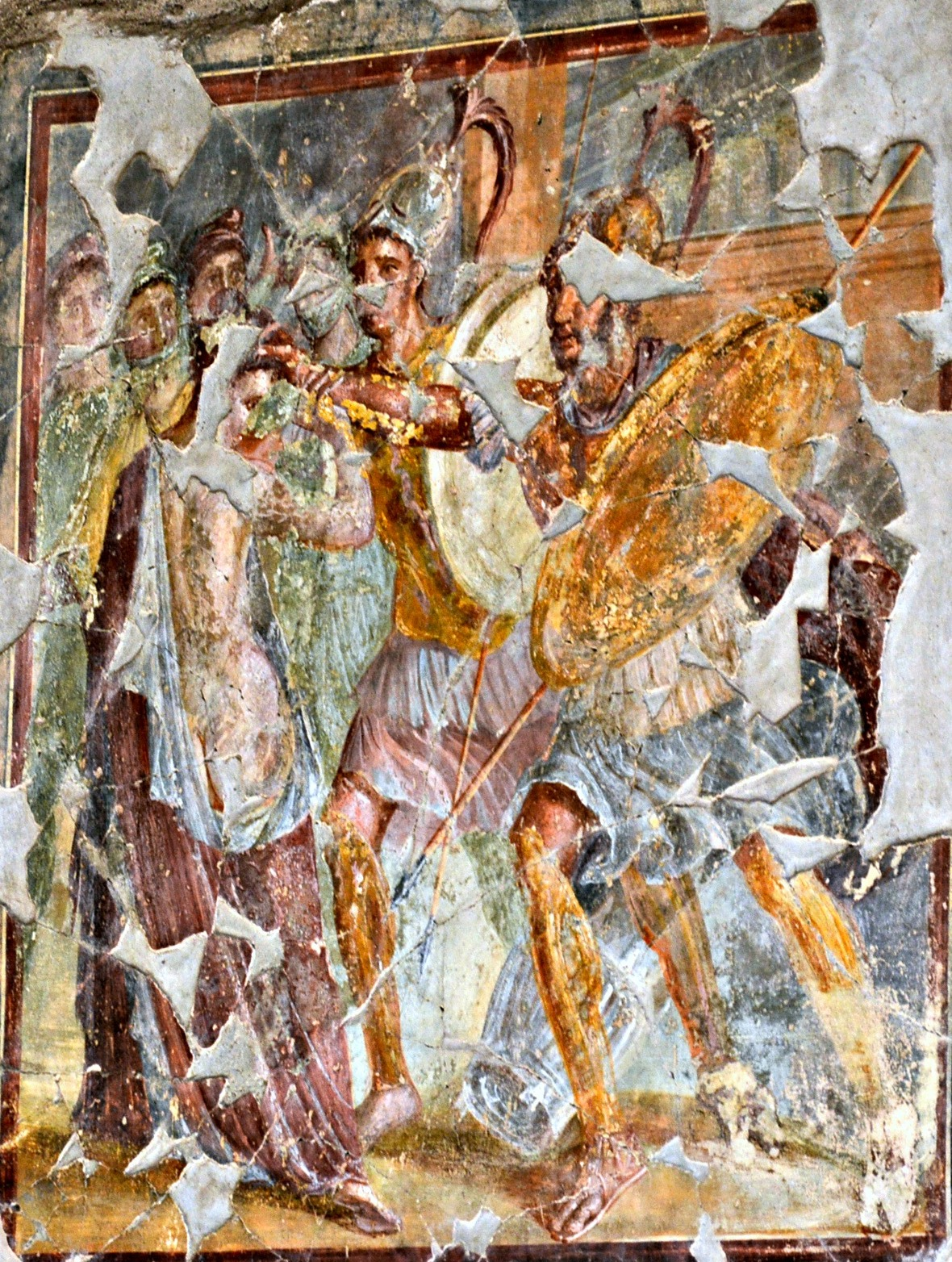
Antique fresco depicting Helen and Menelaus, from the Casa dell'Efebo, Pompeii

Helen frequently appeared in Athenian comedies of the fifth century BC as a caricature of Pericles's mistress Aspasia. In Hellenistic times, she was associated with the moon due to the similarity of her name to the Greek word Σελήνη (Selēnē), meaning "Moon, goddess of the moon". One Pythagorean source claimed that Helen had originally come from a colony on the moon, where people were larger, stronger, and "fifteen times" more beautiful than ordinary mortals. She is one of the characters in the tragedy The Trojan Women produced in 415 BC by the Greek playwright Euripides, where she faces off against Hecuba, the queen of Troy, who upbraids her and suggests she is completely immoral—while Helen defends herself partly by telling Hecuba that it was her fault for giving birth to Paris in the first place, and not killing him as an infant, as a prophecy had advised.

Dio Chrysostom absolved Helen of guilt for the Trojan War by making Paris her first, original husband and claiming that the Greeks started the war out of jealousy. Virgil, in his Aeneid, makes Aeneas the one to spare Helen's life, rather than Menelaus, and instead portrays the act as a lofty example of self-control. Meanwhile, Virgil also makes Helen more vicious by having her betray her own husband Deiphobos and give him over to Menelaus as a peace offering. The satirist Lucian of Samosata features Helen in his famous Dialogues of the Dead, in which he portrays her deceased spirit as aged and withered.

In the early Middle Ages, after the rise of Christianity, Helen was seen as a pagan equivalent to Eve from the Book of Genesis. Helen was so beloved by early medieval Christians that she even took on some of the roles of the Virgin Mary.

During the Renaissance, the French poet Pierre de Ronsard wrote 142 sonnets addressed to a woman named Hélène de Surgères, in which he declared her to be the "true", French Helen, rather than the "lie" of the Greeks.

Dante's Inferno has Helen tormented in the circle of lust alongside Paris.

=== Faust ===
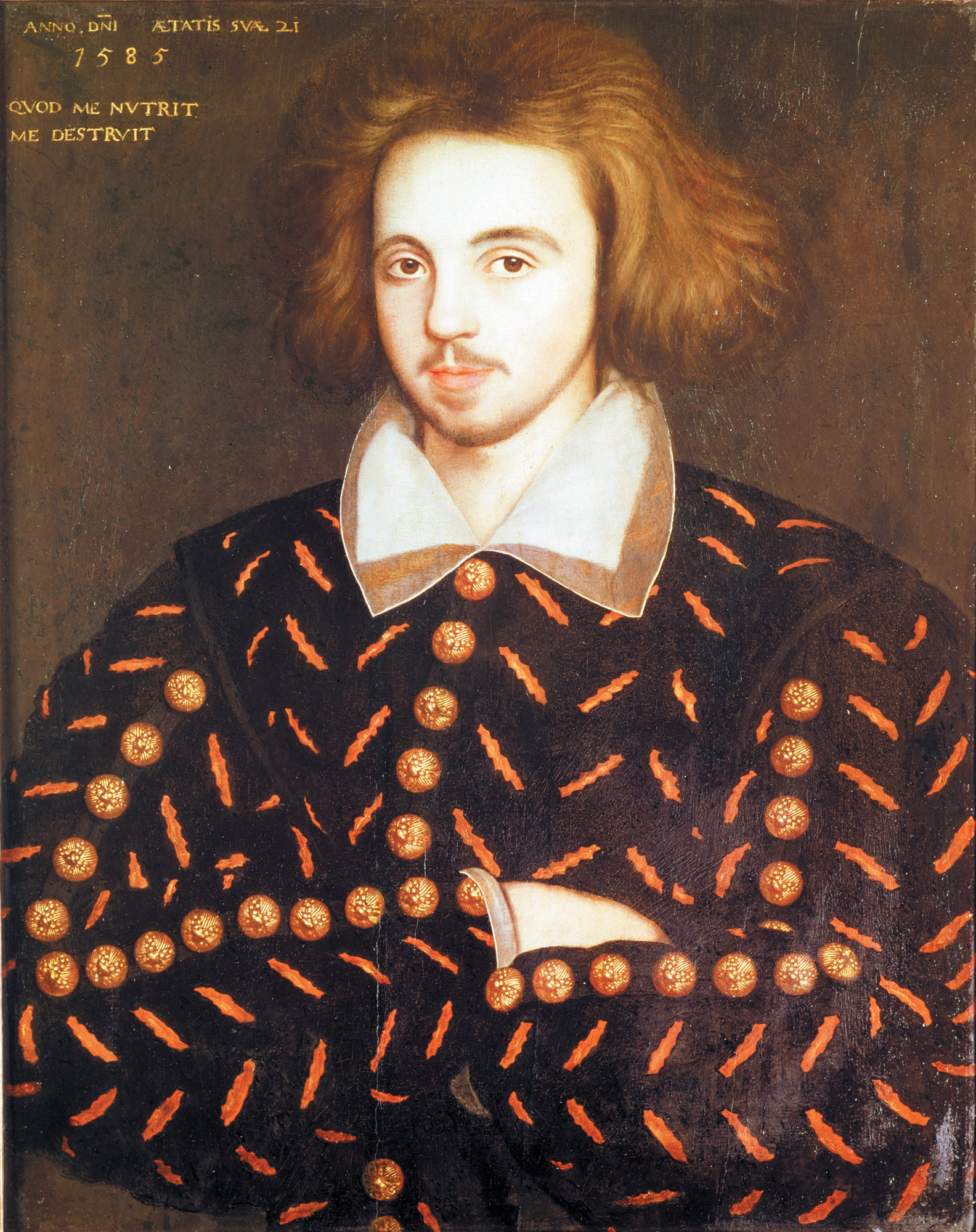
Christopher Marlowe's (this 1585 portrait is disputed) play The Tragical History of Doctor Faustus (1604) is the source of the famous quote "Was this the face that launched a thousand ships / And burnt the topless towers of Ilium?", although the line is ultimately derived from a quotation in Lucian's Dialogues of the Dead.

Helen appears in various versions of the Faust myth, including Christopher Marlowe's 1604 play The Tragical History of Doctor Faustus, in which Faustus famously marvels, "Was this the face that launched a thousand ships / And burnt the topless towers of Ilium?" upon seeing a demon impersonating Helen. The line, which is frequently quoted out of context, is a paraphrase of a statement from Lucian's Dialogues of the Dead. It is debated whether the phrase conveys astonishment at Helen's beauty, or disappointment that she is not more beautiful. Helen appears in Marlowe's play as a voiceless image conjured by Mephistopheles. Helen first appears displayed to scholars as a vision to admire. Her second appearance is when Faustus calls for her in despair. Not speaking herself, Faustus shows she is an object of desire and destruction. She walks about to parade her beauty silently, tempting Faustus. In connection to the myth of Helen of Troy, Helen is often blamed with causing the Trojan War; Marlowe's portrayal of Helen may function as a test of Faustus’ damnation. It is undetermined if the Helen in Doctor Faustus is the real Helen or merely a disguised entity that mimicks her beauty, blurring the lines of blame for Faustus' temptation. Marlowe's portrayal of Helen blurs the line between a beautiful, angel-like figure and an evil, dangerously tempting figure, allowing her to be ambiguous in regard to her role in Faustus' damned fate.

The German poet and polymath Johann Wolfgang von Goethe re-envisioned the meeting of Faust and Helen. In Faust: The Second Part of the Tragedy, the union of Helen and Faust becomes a complex allegory of the meeting of the classical-ideal and modern worlds.

Helen of Troy is a minor character in the opera Mefistofele by Arrigo Boito, which received its premiere in Milan in 1868.

=== 19th and 20th centuries ===
In 1803, when French zoologist François Marie Daudin was to name a new species of beautifully colored snake, the trinket snake (Coelognathus helena), he chose the specific name helena in reference to Helen of Troy.

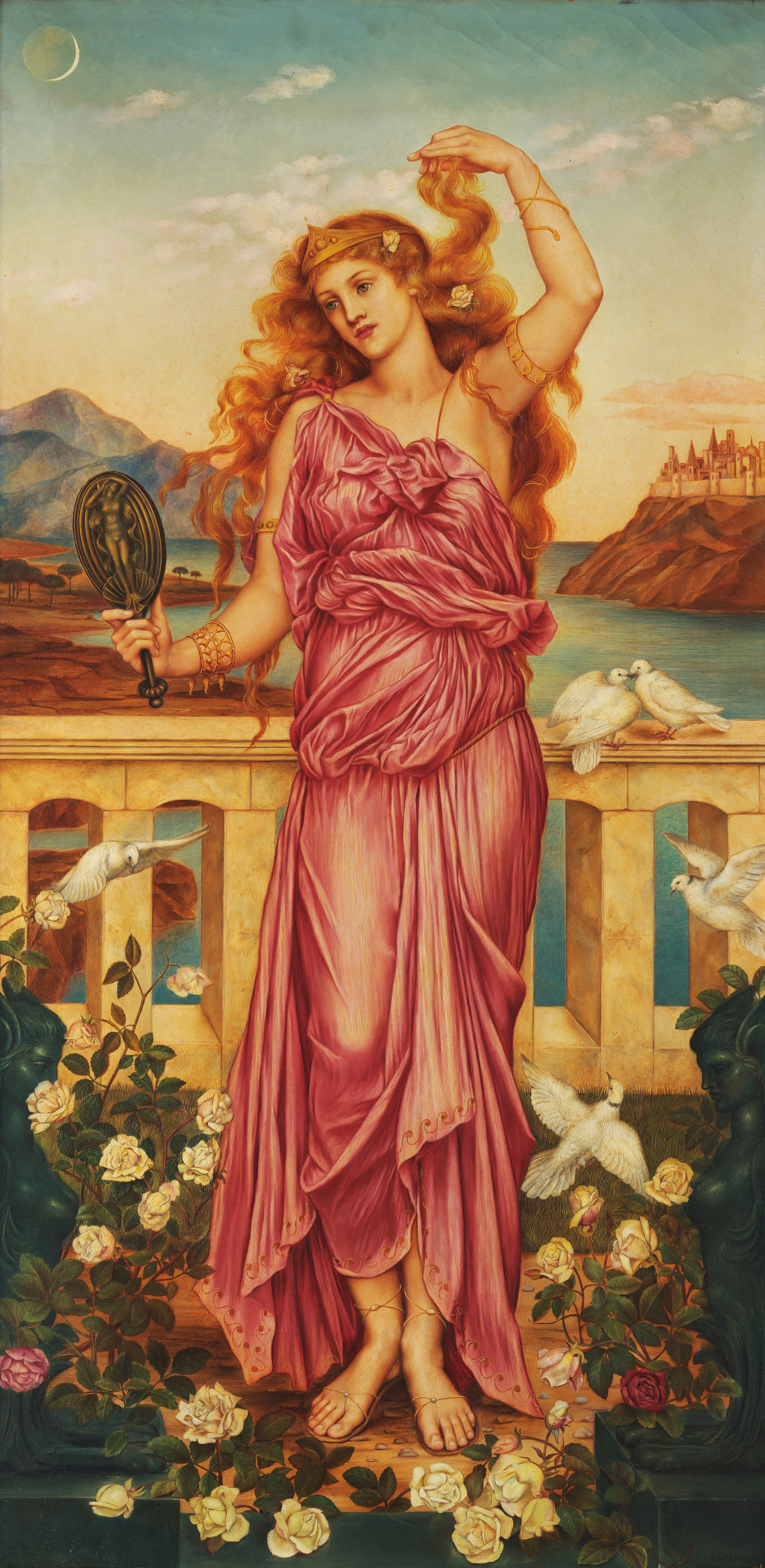
Helen of Troy by Evelyn De Morgan (1898, London); Helen admiringly displays a lock of her hair, as she gazes into a mirror decorated with the nude Aphrodite.

In 1864, Paris saw the premiere of the operetta La belle Hélène by Jacques Offenbach.

In 1881, Oscar Wilde published a poem entitled "The New Helen", in which he declared his friend Lillie Langtry to be the reincarnation of Helen of Troy. Wilde portrays this new Helen as the antithesis of the Virgin Mary, but endows her with the characteristics of Jesus Christ himself. The Irish poet William Butler Yeats compared Helen to his muse, Maude Gonne, in his poems "No Second Troy" (1916) and "A Man Young and Old" (1928). The anthology The Dark Tower by C. S. Lewis includes a fragment entitled "After Ten Years". In Egypt after the Trojan War, Menelaus is allowed to choose between the real, disappointing Helen and an ideal Helen conjured by Egyptian magicians.

The English Pre-Raphaelite painter Evelyn De Morgan portrayed a sexually assertive Helen in her 1898 painting Helen of Troy. Salvador Dalí was obsessed with Helen of Troy from childhood and saw his wife Gala Dalí and the surrealist character Gradiva as the embodiments of Helen. He dedicates his autobiography Diary of a Genius to "my genius Gala Gradiva, Helen of Troy, Saint Helen, Gala Galatea Placida."

Minor planet 101 Helena discovered by James Craig Watson in 1868, is named after Helen of Troy.

John Erskine's 1925 bestselling novel The Private Life of Helen of Troy portrayed Helen as a "sensible, bourgeois heroine", but the 1927 silent film of the same name, directed by Alexander Korda, transformed Helen into "a shopaholic fashion maven".

In 1928, Richard Strauss wrote the German opera Die ägyptische Helena (The Egyptian Helena), which is the story of Helen and Menelaus's troubles when they are marooned on a mythical island.

The 1938 short story, "Helen O'Loy", written by Lester del Rey, details the creation of a synthetic woman by two mechanics. The title is wordplay that combines "Helen of Troy" with "alloy".

The 1951 Swedish film Sköna Helena is an adapted version of Offenbach's operetta, starring Max Hansen and Eva Dahlbeck. In 1956, a Franco-British epic titled Helen of Troy was released, directed by Oscar-winning director Robert Wise and starring Italian actress Rossana Podestà in the title role. It was filmed in Italy, and featured well-known British character actors such as Harry Andrews, Cedric Hardwicke, and Torin Thatcher in supporting roles.

The 1971 film The Trojan Women was an adaptation of the play by Euripides in which Irene Papas portrayed (a non-blonde) Helen of Troy.

In the 1998 TV series Hercules, Helen appears as a supporting character at Prometheus Academy as a student. Helen is caring and enthusiastic. She was the most popular girl in the academy and Adonis' girlfriend. Helen tries her best to keep Adonis from behaving stupidly, but mostly fails. She likes Hercules, but as a friend. She is a princess as in the myth but is not a half-sister of Hercules in the series. She was voiced by Jodi Benson.

=== 21st century ===
Ellen McLaughlin's play, Helen, published in 2002, takes up the themes common in the literature since at least Euripides' play, of the dichotomy between reality and fantasy, and how it shapes the life of women. The play takes place in a hotel in Egypt, where Helen has been waiting out the war, only to find that a phantom, idealized Helen has taken her place both in the hearts of people and in her own husband Menelaus' heart, much like the fantasy image of Marilyn Monroe and other "glamorous" women—ultimately, the real character of Helen is rejected by her husband who chooses the phantom instead, and finds herself at the end of the play, old and anonymous, beginning to write her story herself. In 2003, a television version of Helen's life up to the fall of Troy, Helen of Troy, was released in which she was played by Sienna Guillory. In this version, Helen is depicted as unhappy in her marriage and willingly runs away with Paris, with whom she has fallen in love, but still returns to Menelaus after Paris dies and Troy falls.

Helen was portrayed by Diane Kruger in the 2004 film Troy. In this adaptation, as in the 2003 television version, she is unhappily married to Menelaus and willingly leaves with Paris, whom she loves. However, in this version she does not return to Sparta with Menelaus (who is killed by Hector), but escapes Troy with Paris and other survivors when the city falls.

Inspired by the line, "Was this the face that launched a thousand ships...?" from Marlowe's Faustus, Isaac Asimov jocularly coined the unit "millihelen" to mean the amount of beauty that can launch one ship. Canadian novelist and poet Margaret Atwood re-envisioned the myth of Helen in modern, feminist guise in her poem "Helen of Troy Does Countertop Dancing".

In the 2026 film The Odyssey, Lupita Nyong'o portrays both Helen and her sister Clytemnestra.

== See also ==
- Astyanassa
- Simon Magus and Helen

== Additional references ==
=== Primary sources ===
- Aristophanes, Lysistrata. For an English translation see the Perseus Project.
- Cicero, De inventione II.1.1–2
- Cypria, fragments 1, 9, and 10. For an English translation see the Medieval and Classical Literature Library.
- Dio Chrysostom, Discourses. For an English translation, see Lacus Curtius.
- Euripides, Helen. For an English translation, see the Perseus Project.
- Euripides, Iphigenia in Aulis. For an English translation, see the Perseus project.
- Euripides, Orestes. For an English translation, see the Perseus Project.
- Herodotus, Histories, Book II. For an English translation, see the Perseus Project.
- Hesiod, Catalogs of Women and Eoiae. For an English translation see the Medieval and Classical Literature Library.
- Homer, Iliad, Book III; Odyssey, Books IV, and XXIII.
- Hyginus, Fables. Translated in English by Mary Grant.
- Isocrates, Helen. For an English translation, see the Perseus Project.
- Servius, In Aeneida I.526, XI.262
- Lactantius Placidus, Commentarii in Statii Thebaida I.21.
- Little Iliad, fragment 13. For an English translation, see the Medieval and Classical Literature Library.
- Ovid, Heroides, XVI.Paris Helenae. For an English translation, see the Perseus Project.
- Pausanias, Description of Greece, Book III. For an English translation, see the Perseus Project.
- Pseudo-Apollodorus, Bibliotheca, Book III; Epitome.
- Sappho, fragment 16.
- Sextus Propertius, Elegies, 3.14. Translated in English by A.S. Kline.
- Theocritus, Idylls, XVIII (The Epithalamium of Helen). Translated in English by J. M. Edmonds.
- Virgil, Aeneid. Book VI. For an English translation see the Perseus Project.

=== Secondary sources ===
- Allan, William (2008). "Introduction". Euripides: Helen. Cambridge University Press. ISBN 978-0-521-83690-6.
- Anderson, Michael John (1997). "Further Directions". The Fall of Troy in early Greek Poetry and Art. Oxford University Press. ISBN 0-19-815064-4.
- Blondell, Ruby (2013). Helen of Troy: Beauty, Myth, Devastation. Oxford University Press. ISBN 978-0-19-973160-2.
- Cairns, Francis (2006). "A Lighter Shade of Praise". Sextus Propertius. Cambridge University Press. ISBN 0-521-86457-7.
- Calame, Claude (2001). "Chorus and Ritual". Choruses of Young Women in Ancient Greece (translated by Derek Collins and Janice Orion). Rowman & Littlefield. ISBN 0-7425-1525-7.
- Caprino, Alexandra (1996). "Greek Mythology in Etruria". In Franklin Hall, John (ed.). Etruscan Italy. Indiana University Press. ISBN 0-8425-2334-0.
- Cingano, Ettore (2005). "A Catalog within a Catalog: Helen's Suitors in the Hesiodic Catalog of Women". In Hunter, Richard L. (ed.). The Hesiodic Catalog of Women. Cambridge University Press. ISBN 0-521-83684-0.
- Clader, Linda Lee (1976). Helen. Brill Archive. ISBN 90-04-04721-2.
- Cyrino, Monica S. (2006). "Helen of Troy". In Winkler, Martin M. (ed.). Troy: from Homer's Iliad to Hollywood. Cambridge University Press. ISBN 1-4051-3182-9.
- David, Benjamin (2005). "Narrative in Context". In Jenkens, Lawrence A. (ed.). Renaissance Siena. Truman State University. ISBN 1-931112-43-6.
- Eaverly, Mary Ann (1995). "Geographical and Chronological Distribution". Archaic Greek Equestrian Sculpture. University of Michigan Press. ISBN 0-472-10351-2.
- Edmunds, Lowell (May 2007). "Helen's Divine Origins". Electronic Antiquity: Communicating the Classics. X (2): 1–44.
- Gantz, Timothy (2004). Early Greek Myth. Baltimore, MD and London: The Johns Hopkins University Press. ISBN 0-8018-5362-1.
- Grimal, Pierre, The Dictionary of Classical Mythology, Wiley-Blackwell, 1996. ISBN 978-0-631-20102-1. Internet Archive.
- Gumpert, Matthew (2001). "Helen in Greece". Grafting Helen. University of Wisconsin Press. ISBN 0-299-17124-8.
- Hard, Robin; Rose, Herbert Jennings (2004). "the Trojan War". The Routledge Handbook of Greek Mythology. Routledge. ISBN 0-415-18636-6.
- Hornblower, Simon (2015). Lycophron: Alexandra: Greek Text, Translation, Commentary, & Introduction. Oxford University Press. ISBN 978-0199576708.
- Hughes, Bettany (2005). Helen of Troy: Goddess, Princess, Whore. New York: Alfred A. Knopf. ISBN 0-224-07177-7.
- Jackson, Peter (2006). "Shapeshifting Rape and Xoros". The Transformations of Helen. J.H.Röll Verlag.
- Kim, Lawrence (2010). "Homer, poet and historian". Homer Between History and Fiction in Imperial Greek Literature. Cambridge University Press. ISBN 978-0-521-19449-5.
- Lindsay, Jack (1974). "Helen in the Fifth Century". Helen of Troy: Woman and Goddess. Rowman and Littlefield. ISBN 0-87471-581-4.
- Lynn Budin, Stephanie (2006). "Religion and Ideology". The Ancient Greeks. ABC-CLIO. ISBN 1-57607-814-0.
- Maguire, Laurie (2009). "Beauty". Helen of Troy. John Wiley and Sons. ISBN 978-1-4051-2635-9.
- Mansfield, Elizabeth (2007). "Helen's Uncanny Beauty". Too Beautiful to Picture. University of Minnesota Press. ISBN 978-0-8166-4749-1.
- Matheson, Susan B. (1996). "Heroes". Polygnotos and Vase Painting in Classical Athens. University of Wisconsin Press. ISBN 0-299-13870-4.
- Meagher, Robert E. (2002). The Meaning of Helen. Bolchazy–Carducci Publishers. ISBN 0-86516-510-6.
- Mills, Sophie (1997). "Theseus and Helen". Theseus, Tragedy, and the Athenian Empire. Oxford University Press. ISBN 0-19-815063-6.
- Moser, Thomas C. (2004). A Cosmos of Desire. University of Michigan Press. ISBN 0-472-11379-8.
- Pomeroy, Sarah B. (2002). "Education". Spartan Women. Oxford University Press. ISBN 0-19-513067-7.
- Redfield, James (1994). "The Hero". The Tragedy of Hector. Duke University Press. ISBN 0-8223-1422-3.
- Skutsch, Otto (1987). "Helen, her Name and Nature". The Journal of Hellenic Studies. 107: 188–193. doi:10.2307/630087. JSTOR 630087. S2CID 161933465.
- Suzuki, Mihoko (1992). "The Iliad". Metamorphoses of Helen. Cornell University Press. ISBN 0-8014-8080-9.
- Thompson, Diane P. (2004). "The Fall of Troy – The Beginning of Greek History". The Trojan War. McFarland. ISBN 0-7864-1737-4.
