= Nicostratus (mythology) =

Son of Menelaus and Helen of Troy

In Greek mythology, Nicostratus (Ancient Greek: Νικόστρατος) is a son of Menelaus, the king of Sparta. He was known to Hesiod and epic poet Cinaethon. His name means 'Victorious Army' and suggests that his birth came after the Trojan War.

== Family ==
Nicostratus' mother was either Menelaus' wife Helen of Troy, or a slave. Although in Homer's Odyssey, the only child of Menelaus and Helen is Hermione, other sources also mention a son Nicostratus. The mythographer Apollodorus says that "Menelaus had by Helen a daughter Hermione and, according to some (κατά τινας), a son Nicostratus", while a scholia on Sophocles' Electra quotes Hesiod as saying "She [Helen] bore Hermione to spear-famed Menelaus, and last of all she bore Nicostratus, scion of Ares".

However, according to the geographer Pausanias, Nicostratus, and Megapenthes were sons of Menelaus by a slave, and because they were illegitimate, Agamemnon's son Orestes succeeded Menelaus as king of Sparta.

One account mentioned that Nicostratus and Aithiolas, two sons of Helen, were worshipped by the Lacedaemonians.

== Mythology ==
According to the Rhodians, when Orestes was "still wandering" (being chased by the Erinyes because of his killing of his mother Clytemenestra), Nicostratus and Megapenthes drove out Helen, who found refuge on Rhodes with Polyxo.

According to Pausanias, Nicostratus and Megapenthes were depicted, riding a single horse, on the sixth century BC Doric-Ionic temple complex at Amyclae known as the throne of Apollo, designed by Bathycles of Magnesia.

== In popular culture ==
Although Nicostratus does not figure in any ancient account of the Trojan War, he is the central character in The Luck of Troy, a modern retelling of the story by Roger Lancelyn Green.
