= Aethiolas =

Spartan prince from Greek mythology

In Greek mythology, Aethiolas or Aithiolas was a Spartan prince as the son of King Menelaus and his wife Helen or a concubine. He and his brother Nicostratus were worshipped by the Lacedaemonians.
