= Polyxo (Rhodes) =

Wife of Tlepolemus in Greek mythology

In Greek mythology, Polyxo (/pəˈlɪksoʊ/; Ancient Greek: Πολυξώ, romanized: Poluxṓ), also known as Philozoë (Ancient Greek: Φιλοζώη, romanized: Philozṓē, lit. 'animal-loving' or 'life-loving'), is the wife of the Trojan War hero Tlepolemus, and later the queen of Rhodes, an island in the southeastern Aegean sea. Following her husband's death during the war, Polyxo took revenge against Helen, whom she blamed for all the sorrows she had suffered. Polyxo's role in the myth is connected to Helen's Rhodian tree-cult.

== Family ==
Polyxo was born in Argos, of unclear line. She married a son of Heracles called Tlepolemus, and had an unnamed son by him.

== Mythology ==
After her marriage to Tlepolemus and his subsequent exile due to his murder of Licymnius, Polyxo followed him to the island of Rhodes, where they had a son together. But Tlepolemus had once been one of the suitors of Helen of Troy, so when Paris took her with him to Troy, Tlepolemus left to join the expedition that would bring Helen back to her husband Menelaus. Tlepolemus fought and was killed by Sarpedon at Troy, leaving Polyxo a widow and their son an orphan. Mourning greatly, Polyxo organised funerary games for her deceased husband in which children competed and the victors were crowned with wreaths of poplar leaves.

Many years later, after Menelaus had died, his illegitimate sons drove Helen out of Sparta, and she came to Rhodes, requesting shelter from her old friend Polyxo who was ruling as queen at the time. Polyxo had grown to resent her and desired to take revenge for her slain husband, so she pretended to receive Helen warmly at first. But while Helen was blissfully relaxing in a bath, she sent her some handmaidens dressed up like the Erinyes, goddesses of justice, retribution and revenge. The servants seized Helen and hanged her on a tree, killing her. The Rhodians would build a sanctuary to worship Helen of the Tree (Helene Dendritis), as they dubbed her.

In another version, Menelaus and Helen landed at Rhodes on their way back from Egypt. Polyxo, wanting to avenge Tlepolemus, sent a large host of Rhodians armed with stones and fire to the ships. Menelaus hid Helen under the deck, and made one of his wife's most beautiful attendants wear her crown and garment. The Rhodians killed the servant then, mistaking her for Helen. Satisfied that justice had been served, Polyxo and the Rhodians withdrew, and troubled the Spartan royal couple no more.

== In culture ==
The version where Polyxo kills Helen in Rhodes is rather contrary to the usual happy traditions about Helen's post-Troy fate, and was probably invented to explain the Rhodian tree cult. Dedications to the goddess Athena are recorded in the Lindos Chronicle to have been offered by Helen and Menelaus. Traces of hanged-woman worship were also found elsewhere in ancient Greece as well.

Polyxo and her myth seem to have been used to explain how the cult of Helen arrived in Rhodes from Laconia via the Trojan War epic narrative and the Rhodian hero who joined the effort to bring Helen back; Polyxo was probably invented in order to fill the gap with her role as the agent who caused the death of Helen. The motiff of the Erinyes that Polyxo sends against her might have been unique to Rhodes, or also imported from mainland Greece. It is also possible that it is a remnant of a lost version of the myth in which the actual Erinyes hanged Helen or caused her to hang herself.

== See also ==
Other queens in Greek mythology:

- Callidice of Thesprotia, queen of Thesprotia
- Aëdon, who failed to kill her intended victim
- Otrera, queen of the Amazons

== Bibliography ==
=== Primary sources ===
- Gaius Julius Hyginus, Fabulae from The Myths of Hyginus translated and edited by Mary Grant. University of Kansas Publications in Humanistic Studies. Online version at the Topos Text Project.
- Homer, the Iliad with an English Translation by A.T. Murray, Ph.D. in two volumes. Cambridge, MA., Harvard University Press; London, William Heinemann, Ltd. 1924. ISBN 978-0674995796. Online version at the Perseus Digital Library.
- Pausanias, Description of Greece with an English Translation by W.H.S. Jones, Litt.D., and H.A. Ormerod, M.A., in 4 Volumes. Cambridge, MA, Harvard University Press; London, William Heinemann Ltd. 1918. Online version at the Perseus Digital Library.
- Polyaenus, Stratagems of War, with an English translation by E. Shepherd, 1793. Online text at attalus.org.
- Tzetzes, John, Lycophronis Alexandra. Vol. II: Scholia Continens, edited by Eduard Scheer, Berlin, Weidmann, 1881. Internet Archive.

=== Secondary sources ===
- Avery, Catherine B., ed. (1962). New Century Classical Handbook. New York, US: Appleton-Century-Crofts.
- Bell, Robert E. (1991). Women of Classical Mythology: A Biographical Dictionary. ABC-Clio. ISBN 9780874365818.
- Edmunds, Lowell (2016). Stealing Helen: The Myth of the Abducted Wife in Comparative Perspective. UK, US: Princeton University Press. ISBN 978-0-691-16512-7.
- Grant, Michael; Hazel, John (August 2, 2004). Who's Who in Classical Mythology. London and New York: Routledge. ISBN 0-415-26041-8.
- Graves, Robert (1955). The Greek Myths. Vol. I (3rd 1960 ed.). London: Penguin. ISBN 978-0140010268.
- Grimal, Pierre (1987). The Dictionary of Classical Mythology. Wiley-Blackwell. ISBN 0-631-13209-0.
- Hard, Robin (2004). The Routledge Handbook of Greek Mythology: Based on H. J. Rose's "Handbook of Greek Mythology". Routledge. ISBN 9780415186360.
- Johnston, Sarah Iles (August 2, 2013). Restless Dead: Encounters between the Living and the Dead in Ancient Greece. California, US: University of California Press. ISBN 978-0-520-21707-2.
- March, Jennifer R. (May 31, 2014). Dictionary of Classical Mythology. Oxbow Books. ISBN 978-1-78297-635-6.
- Seyffert, Oskar (1901). A Dictionary of Classical Antiquities, Mythology, Religion, Literature and Art. Swan Sonnenschein and Co.
- Smith, William (1873). A Dictionary of Greek and Roman Biography and Mythology. London, UK: John Murray, printed by Spottiswoode and Co. Online version at the Perseus.tufts library.
- Tripp, Edward (June 1970). Crowell's Handbook of Classical Mythology (1st ed.). Thomas Y. Crowell Co. ISBN 069022608X.
