= Tlepolemus =

Son of Heracles in Greek myth

In Greek mythology, Tlepolemus (/(t)lɪˈpɒlɪməs/; Ancient Greek: Τληπόλεμος, romanized: Tlēpólemos, lit. 'enduring war' or 'patient in battle') was the leader of the Rhodian forces in the Trojan War.

== Family ==
Tlepolemus was a son of Heracles and Astyoche, daughter of Phylas, king of Ephyra. Though some sources say that his mother was Astydameia, daughter of Amyntor or Ormenus.

== Mythology ==
Tlepolemus fled to Rhodes after slaying Licymnius, Heracles' aged maternal uncle. According to the Bibliotheca, this was an accident—Tlepolemus was beating a servant when Licymnius ran between the two, suffering a fatal blow,—but Pindar states that the death was intentional and motivated by anger. Accompanied by his Argive wife Polyxo, Tlepolemus made passage to Rhodes and divided the island into three parts, founding three Rhodian city-states: Cameirus, Ialysus and Lindus.

Tlepolemus was among those who escorted Poemander (who had accidentally slain his son while attempting to avoid serving in the Trojan War) on his way to be purified by Elephenor.

Hyginus lists Tlepolemus among the suitors of Helen; thus bound by the oath of Tyndareus, he was among the Greek allies in the campaign against Troy, leading a force of nine ships.

He encountered Sarpedon on the first day of fighting recounted in the Iliad and taunted him saying that he lacked courage and could not really be the son of Zeus. Tlepolemus then attacked him, and although he wounded Sarpedon, he was slain by the latter.

According to Pausanias, Polyxo killed Helen to avenge for her husband's death, though Polyaenus says that Menelaus had dressed up a servant in Helen's clothes and that the Rhodians killed her instead as Menelaus and Helen escaped.
