= Nicostratus of Macedonia =

Ancient Greek rhetorician (2nd century)

Nicostratus of Macedonia (Ancient Greek: Νικόστρατος) was a rhetorician who lived in the 2nd century AD. He lived during the reign of the Roman emperor Marcus Aurelius.

The Suda states that he was a contemporary of the rhetorician Aelius Aristides and of Dio Chrysostom. It also places Nicostratus amongst ten rhetoricians in a second category, distinct from the Ten Attic Orators of the earlier period. The Suda also states that some of his works were Decamythia (Ancient Greek: Δεκαμυθία; Ten Myths), Images (Ancient Greek: Εἰκόνες), Polymythia (Ancient Greek: Πολυμυθία; A Multitude of Myths) and Thalattourgoi (Ancient Greek: Θαλαττουργοί; Seaworkers). It also states that he wrote many other works, including encomia addressed to Emperor Marcus Aurelius and to other persons.

Philostratus, in the Lives of the Sophists, praised the elegance of Nicostratus style. Fragments of Nicostratus are preserved in FGrHist 1089. Nicostratus' works are lost.
