= Agesilochus =

2nd-century BC Rhodian ruler

Agesilochus or Hegesilochus (Ancient Greek: Άγεσίλοχος or Άγησίλοχος or Ἡγεσίλοχος), son of Hegesias, was the chief magistrate (or prytaneis) of the Rhodians in the 2nd century BC. On the breaking out of the war between Rome and Perseus of Macedon in 171, he recommended his countrymen to support the side of the Romans. He also counseled Rhodes to enlarge its navy by 40 ships, to increase the city's battle-readiness for whatever course of action that might need to be taken. Seeing this, the Roman envoys Aulus Postumius and Tiberius Claudius returned to Rome confident of Rhodian support.

In 169 Agesilochus was himself sent as ambassador to Rome, with a Nicagoras son of Nicander, to propose a license for Rhodes to import grain from the Roman dominions; according to Polybius, this proposal was apparently successful. In 168 he was one of the Rhodian envoys (along with Damon, Telephus and Nicostratus) sent to negotiate a peace with Perseus and Roman consul Aemilius Paullus in Macedonia.
