= Lindos Chronicle =

Marble inscription from Rhodes, Greece

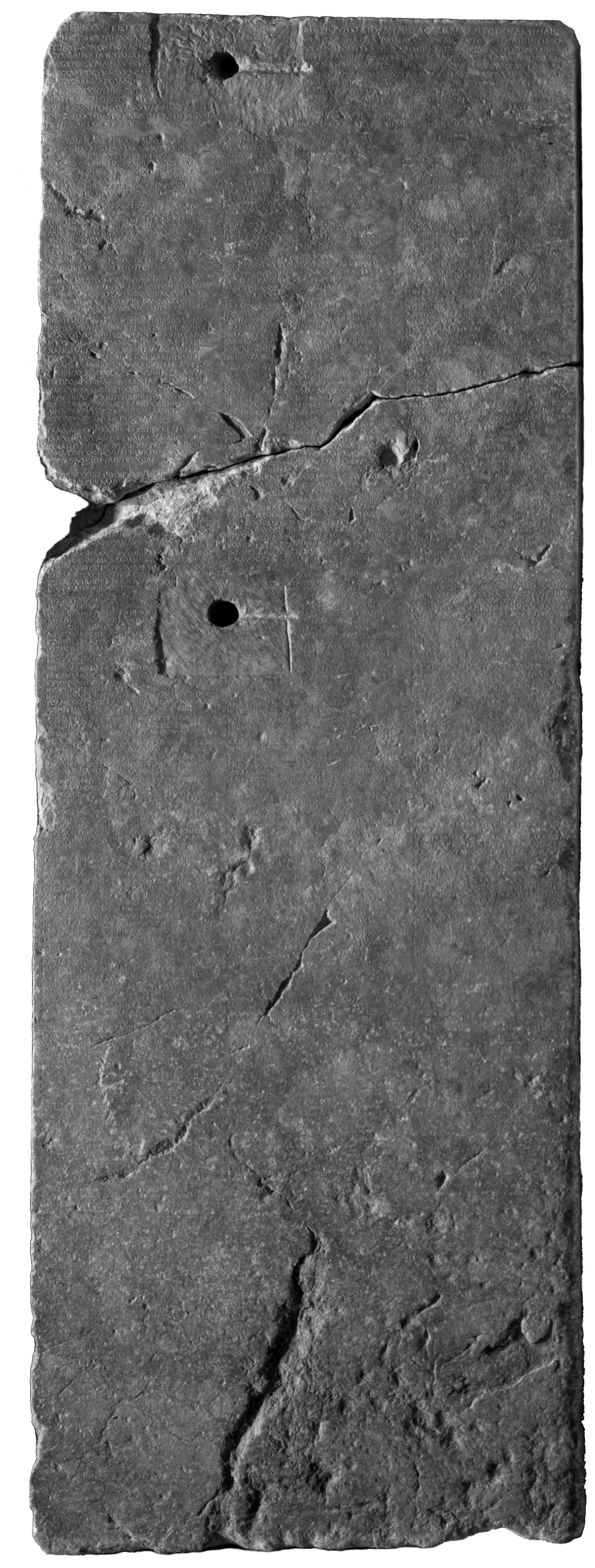
The Lindos Chronicle is an inscription from Lindos, Rhodes, dated to 99 BC.

The Lindos Chronicle, or the Lindian Chronicle, is an inscription from Lindos, Rhodes, dated to 99 BC. It records dedications made in the temple to Athena at Lindos that had been made before the destruction of the original temple in 392–391 BC. The chronicle is one of the longest surviving Hellenistic inscriptions.

== History ==
It was excavated early in the 20th century by a Danish expedition, which found it used as paving block of the Byzantine church of Saint Stephen, near the theatre of Lindos. It contains decrees of Lindians, as well report on previous dedications of rulers and generals to Athena Lindia.

The chronicle was first edited and published in 1912 by Christian Blinkenberg. Carolyn Higbie published the first English translation in 2003.

== Description ==
The chronicle is inscribed on a marble slab, approximately eight-by-three feet, which is now broken into two pieces. The catalogue of dedications contains about forty-five entries, though only thirty-seven are still legible. Additionally, the chronicle contains four miracle stories about Athena, of which only one is still totally legible, and two more are fragmentary.

== Sources ==
- Lindos II 2
- Michael Lackner, Iwo Amelung, Joachim Kurtz: New terms for new ideas, pages 105–125 ISBN 90-04-12046-7
