= Trojan Leaders =

Trojan War figures in Greek mythology

In Greek mythology, the Trojan Leaders were those who responded to the summon of King Priam of Troy as allies against the Achaean invaders during the Trojan War.

| Ethnic Identity | Settlements | Leaders | Sources | | | | Parentage |
|---|---|---|---|---|---|---|---|
| Ethnic Identity | Settlements | Leaders | Homer | Apollodorus | Dictys | Dares | Parentage |
| Trojans | None stated (Troy) | Hector | ✓ | | | ✓ | sons of Priam and Hecuba |
| Trojans | None stated (Troy) | Deiphobus | | | | ✓ | sons of Priam and Hecuba |
| Trojans | None stated (Troy) | Paris | | | | ✓ | sons of Priam and Hecuba |
| Trojans | None stated (Troy) | Troilus | | | | ✓ | son of Priam or Apollo and Hecuba |
| Dardanians | None stated (Dardania) | Aeneas | ✓ | ✓ | | ✓ | son of Anchises and Aphrodite |
| Dardanians | None stated (Dardania) | Archelochus | ✓ | ✓ | | | sons of Antenor |
| Dardanians | None stated (Dardania) | Acamas | ✓ | ✓ | | | sons of Antenor |
| Trojans of Mt. Ida | Zeleia | Pandarus | ✓ | ✓ | ✓ | ✓ | son of Lycaon |
| No name given | Adresteia, Apaesus, Pityeia, Mt. Tereia | Adrestus | ✓ | ✓ | ✓ | ✓ | sons of Merops |
| No name given | Adresteia, Apaesus, Pityeia, Mt. Tereia | Amphius | ✓ | ✓ | ✓ | ✓ | sons of Merops |
| No name given | Percote, Practius, Sestus, Abydus, Arisbe | Asius | ✓ | ✓ | ✓ | ✓ | son of Hyrtacus |
| Pelasgians | Larissa | Hippothous | ✓ | ✓ | ✓ | ✓ | son of Lethus or Pelasgus |
| Pelasgians | Larissa | Pylaeus | ✓ | | ✓ | | son of Lethus |
| Pelasgians | Larissa | Cupesus | | | | ✓ | |
| Thracians | lands bounded by Hellespont | Acamas | ✓ | ✓ | ✓ | ✓ | son of Eusorus |
| Thracians | lands bounded by Hellespont | Peiroüs | ✓ | | ✓ | ✓ | son of Imbrasus |
| Ciconians | Ciconia in Thrace | Euphemus | ✓ | ✓ | ✓ | ✓ | son of Troezenus |
| Paeonians | Amydon, River Axius | Pyraechmes | ✓ | ✓ | ✓ | ✓ | son of Axius |
| Paeonians | Amydon, River Axius | Asteropaios | | | | ✓ | son of Pelagon |
| Paphlagonians | Cytorus, Sesamus, River Parthenius, Cromna, Aegialus, Erythini | Pylaemenes | ✓ | ✓ | ✓ | ✓ | son of Bilsates or Melius |
| Halizones | Alybe | Odius | ✓ | ✓ | ✓ | ✓ | sons of Mecisteus or Minuus |
| Halizones | Alybe | Epistrophus | ✓ | ✓ | ✓ | ✓ | sons of Mecisteus or Minuus |
| Mysians | None stated | Chromis | ✓ | ✓ | ✓ | | sons of Arsinous |
| Mysians | None stated | Ennomus | ✓ | ✓ | ✓ | | sons of Arsinous |
| Phrygians "from afar" | Ascania | Phorcys | ✓ | ✓ | ✓ | ✓ | sons of Aretaon |
| Phrygians "from afar" | Ascania | Ascanius | ✓ | ✓ | ✓ | ✓ | sons of Aretaon |
| Maeonians | Mt. Tmolus | Mesthles | ✓ | ✓ | ✓ | ✓ | sons of Talaemenes |
| Maeonians | Mt. Tmolus | Antiphus | ✓ | ✓ | ✓ | ✓ | sons of Talaemenes |
| Carians | Miletus, Mt. Phthires, streams of the Maeander, crest of Mycale | Nastes | ✓ | ✓ | ✓ | ✓ | sons of Nomion |
| Carians | Miletus, Mt. Phthires, streams of the Maeander, crest of Mycale | Amphimachus | ✓ | ✓ | ✓ | ✓ | sons of Nomion |
| Lycians | River Xanthus, Solymum | Sarpedon | ✓ | ✓ | ✓ | ✓ | son of Zeus or Xanthus and Laodamia |
| Lycians | River Xanthus, Solymum | Glaucus | ✓ | ✓ | ✓ | ✓ | son of Hippolochus |
| No name given | Colophon | Mopsus | | | | ✓ | son of Manto |
| Ethiopians Indians | Ethiopia | Memnon | | | (✓) | ✓ | son of Tithonus and Eos |
| Ethiopians Indians | Ethiopia | Perses | | | | ✓ | |
| Thracians | None stated | Rhesus | (✓) | | (✓) | ✓ | |
| Thracians | None stated | Archilochus | | | | ✓ | |
| Phrygians | None stated | Asius | | | ✓ | | son of Dymas |

== See also ==
- Achaean Leaders
- Trojan Battle Order
