= Trojan Battle Order =

Epic catalogue in the Illiad

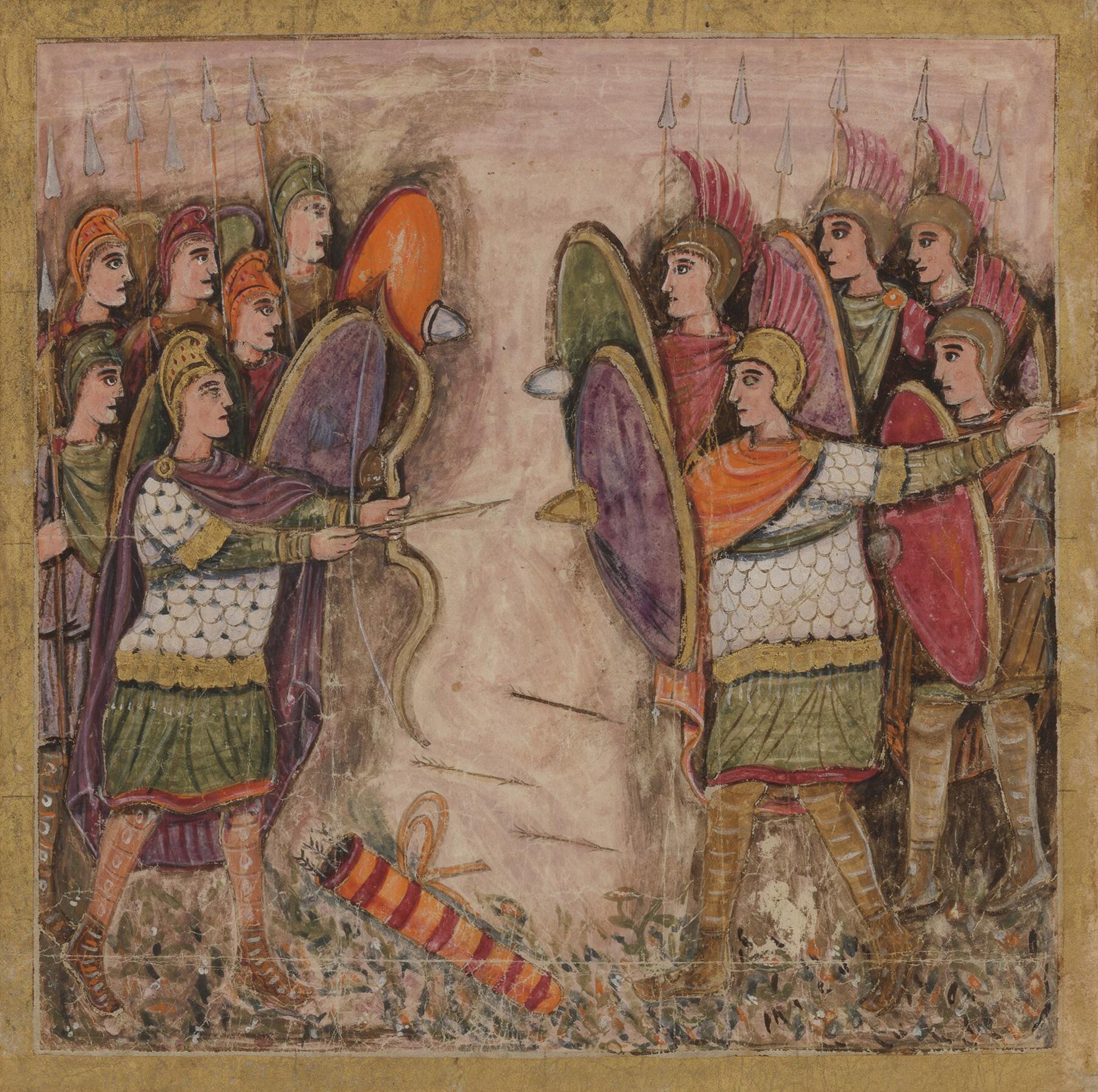
War of Troy, from Vergilius Romanus

The Trojan Battle Order or Trojan Catalogue is an epic catalogue in the second book of the Iliad listing the allied contingents that fought for Troy in the Trojan War. The catalogue is noted for its deficit of detail compared to the immediately preceding Catalogue of Ships, which lists the Greek contingents, and for the fact that only a few of the many Trojans mentioned in the Iliad appear there.

== Historicity question ==
Structurally the Trojan Battle Order is evidently inserted to balance the preceding Catalogue of Ships. It is, however, much shorter. Denys Page summarizes the prevailing explanation that "the Catalogues are substantially Mycenaean compositions rather expanded than altered by the Ionians" (Page 1963, pp. 153–154). Noting that the Greek catalogue occupies 265 lines but the Trojan catalogue only 61, Page wonders why the Ionian authors know so little about their native land and concludes they are not describing it but are reforming poetry inherited in oral form from Mycenaean times (Page 1963, pp. 137–139).

Some examples of Mycenaean knowledge are (Page 1963, pp. 141–143):

- Alybe in the catalog is the birthplace of silver, yet Hecataeus, the Ionian geographer, does not know where it is.
- The catalog mentions Mount Phthires near Miletus and the Maeander. Hecataeus supposes it was the prior name of Latmus.

There is also some internal evidence that the Trojan catalogue was not part of the Iliad but was a distinct composition pre-dating the Trojan War and incorporated later into the Iliad (Page 1963, p. 140):

- Of the 26 Trojans in the catalog, only 5 appear among the 216 in the Iliad.
- The major Trojan leaders: Priam, Paris, Helenus and a few others do not appear in the catalog at all.
- At Il. 2.858 the Mysians are commanded by Chromis and Ennomus; at 14.511 ff. by Gyrtios.
- At 2.858 the Mysians live in Asia Minor; at 13.5, Thrace.
- At. 2.827 Apollo gives Pandaros his bow; at 4.105 ff it is made by a craftsman.

Page cites several more subtle instances of the disconnectedness of the Trojan catalog from the Iliad; neither is it connected to the catalog of Greek forces. Another like it appears in the Cypria (Burgess 2004, p. 138).

== The catalogue in detail ==
The catalogue lists 16 contingents from 12 ethnonyms under 26 leaders (Luce 1975). They lived in 33 places identified by toponyms.

Line	Ethnic Identity	Leaders	Settlements
II.816	Trojans	Hector	None stated (Troy)
II.819	Dardanians	Aeneas, Archelochus, Acamas	None stated.
II.824	Trojans of Mt. Ida	Pandarus	Zeleia
II.828	No name given	Adrestus, Amphius	Adresteia, Apaesus, Pityeia, Mount Tereia
II.835	No name given	Asius	Percote, Practius, Sestus, Abydus, Arisbe
II.840	Pelasgians, who were spearmen	Hippothous, Pylaeus	Larissa
II.844	Thracians bounded by the Hellespont	Acamas, Peiroüs	None stated.
II.846	Ciconians, who were spearmen	Euphemus	None stated.
II.848	Paeonians, archers, "from far away"	Pyraechmes (Asteropaios is also recognized as a leader in book XXI)	Amydon, river Axius
II.851	Paphlagonians	Pylaemenes of the Eneti	Cytorus, Sesamus, along the river Parthenius, Cromna, Aegialus, Erythini
II.856	Halizones "from far away"	Odius, Epistrophus	Alybe
II.858	Mysians	Chromis, Ennomus	None stated.
II.862	Phrygians	Phorcys, Ascanius	"Far-off" Ascania
II.864	Maeonians	Mesthles, Antiphus	Under Mt. Tmolus
II.867	Carians	Nastes, Amphimachus	Miletus, Mt. Phthires, streams of the Maeander, crest of Mycale
II.875	Lycians "from far away"	Sarpedon, Glaucus	River Xanthus

== Analyses ==
The list includes the Trojans themselves, led by Hector, and various allies. As observed by G. S. Kirk, it follows a geographical pattern comparable to that of the Greek catalogue, dealing first with Troy, then with the Troad, then radiating outwards on four successive routes, the most distant peoples on each route being described as "from far away" (Kirk 1985, p. 250). The allied contingents are said to have spoken multiple languages, requiring orders to be translated by their individual commanders. Nothing is said of the Trojan language; the Carians are specifically said to be barbarian-speaking, possibly because their language was distinct from the contemporaneous lingua franca of western Anatolia.

The classical Greek historian Demetrius of Scepsis, native of Scepsis in the hills above Troy, wrote a vast study of the "Trojan Battle Order" under that title (Greek Trōikos diakosmos). The work is lost; brief extracts from it are quoted by Athenaeus and Pausanias, while Strabo cites it frequently in his own discussion of the geography of northwestern Anatolia.

== See also ==
- Trojan Leaders
