= Adrastus (disambiguation) =

Adrastus was a legendary king of Argos.

Adrastus (Greek: Ἄδραστος) means inescapable. It may also refer to:

- Adrastus (mythology), various figures in Greek mythology
- Adrastus (son of Gordias), who features in Herodotus's story of King Croesus of Lydia
- Adrastus of Aphrodisias (fl. 2nd century CE), Peripatetic philosopher
- Adrantus (also known as Adrastus or Ardrantus, fl. 2nd or 3rd century CE), Greek writer
- Adrastus of Cyzicus, Ancient Roman astronomer
- Adrastus (beetle), a genus of Elateridae (click beetles)
- Adrastus, an impact crater on the moon Dione

== See also ==
- Adrastea (disambiguation)
- Adrasteia
