= Odius =

Odius may refer to:

- Odius (mythology), character in Trojan War
- Odius (crustacean), a genus of amphipods in the family Odiidae
- Odius, a genus of harvestmen in the family Phalangiidae, synonym of Odiellus
- Odius, a genus of true bugs in the family Pentatomidae, synonym of Caystrus
