= Scupi =

Archaeological site near Skopje, North Macedonia

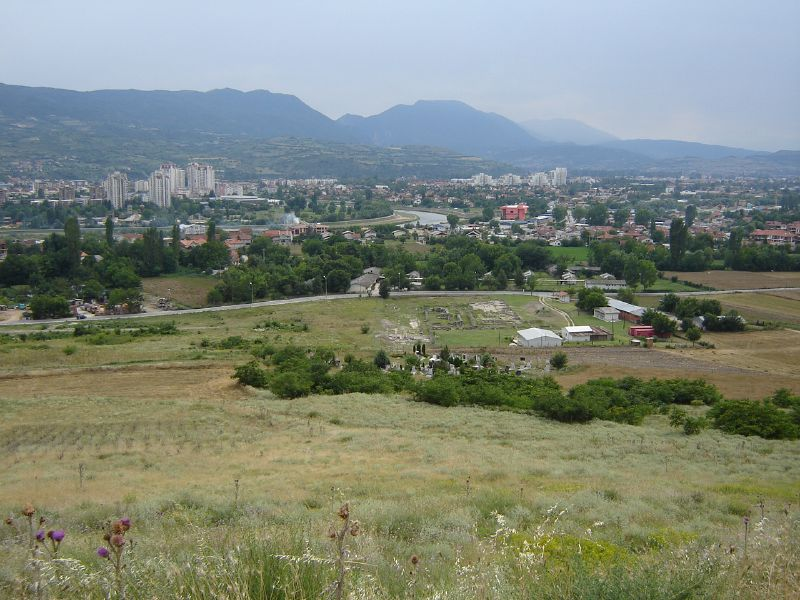
- Panorama of Scupi and Skopje.

- Location within North Macedonia
- 42°00.996′N 21°23.524′E
- Location: Skopje

Scupi (Ancient Greek: Σκούποι, romanized: Skoúpoi; Macedonian: Скупи) is an archaeological site located between Zajčev Rid (Зајчев Рид 'Rabbit Hill') and the Vardar River, several kilometers from the center of modern Skopje in North Macedonia. A Roman military camp was founded here in the second century BC on the site of an older Dardanian settlement. It became later Colonia Flavia Aelia Scupi and many veteran legionnaires were settled there. A Roman town was founded in the time of Domitian (AD 81–96) and Scupi became the chief center for romanizing Dardania. It was abandoned in AD 518 during interregnum between Anastasius I Dicorus and Justin I after an earthquake destroyed the city.

== History ==
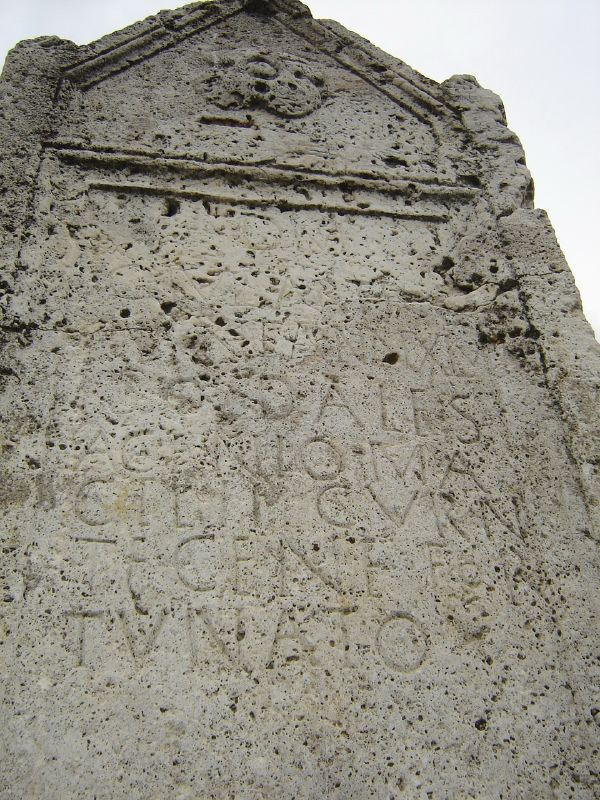
Tombstone in Scupi

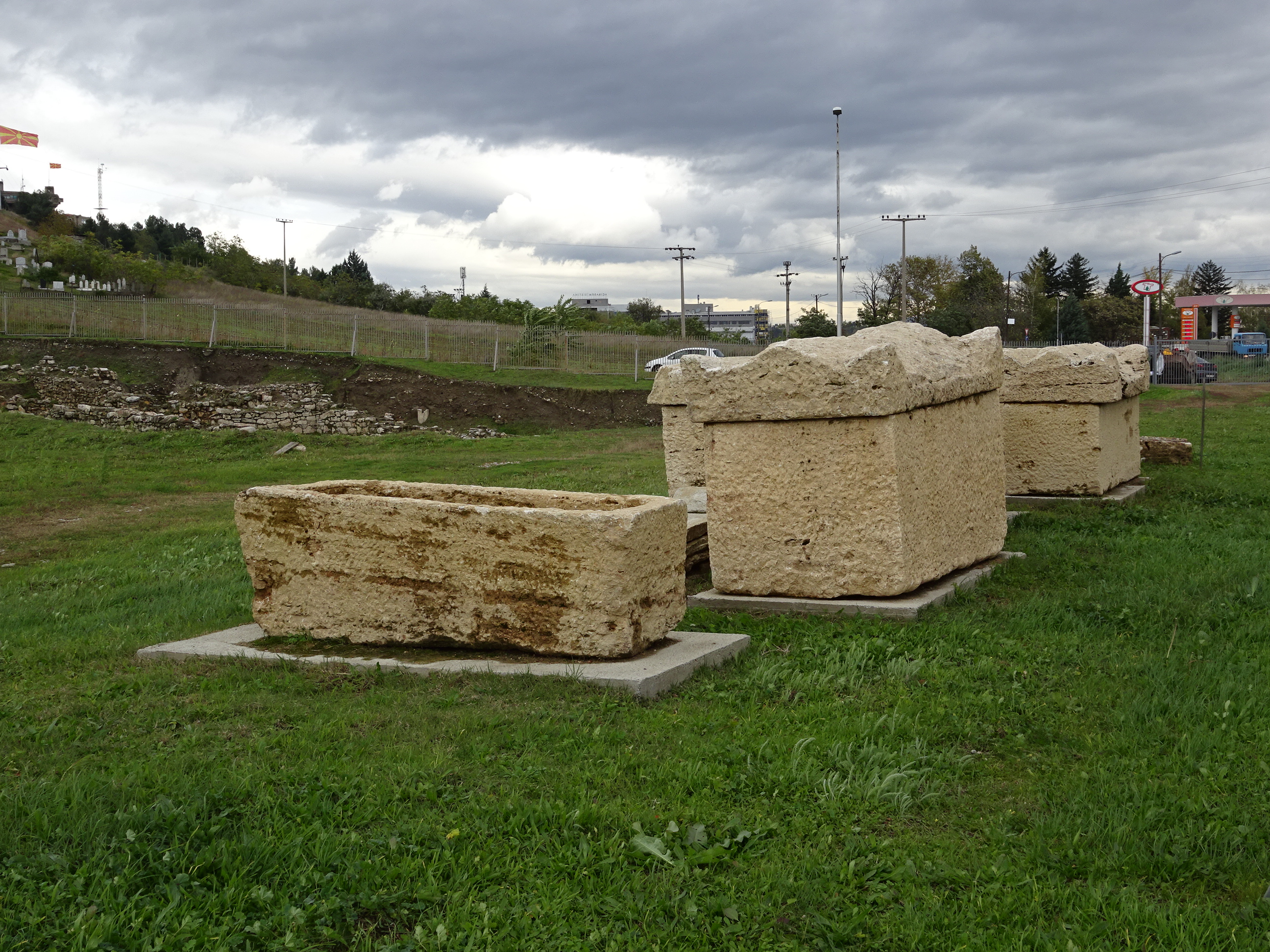
Ancient caskets found in Scupi

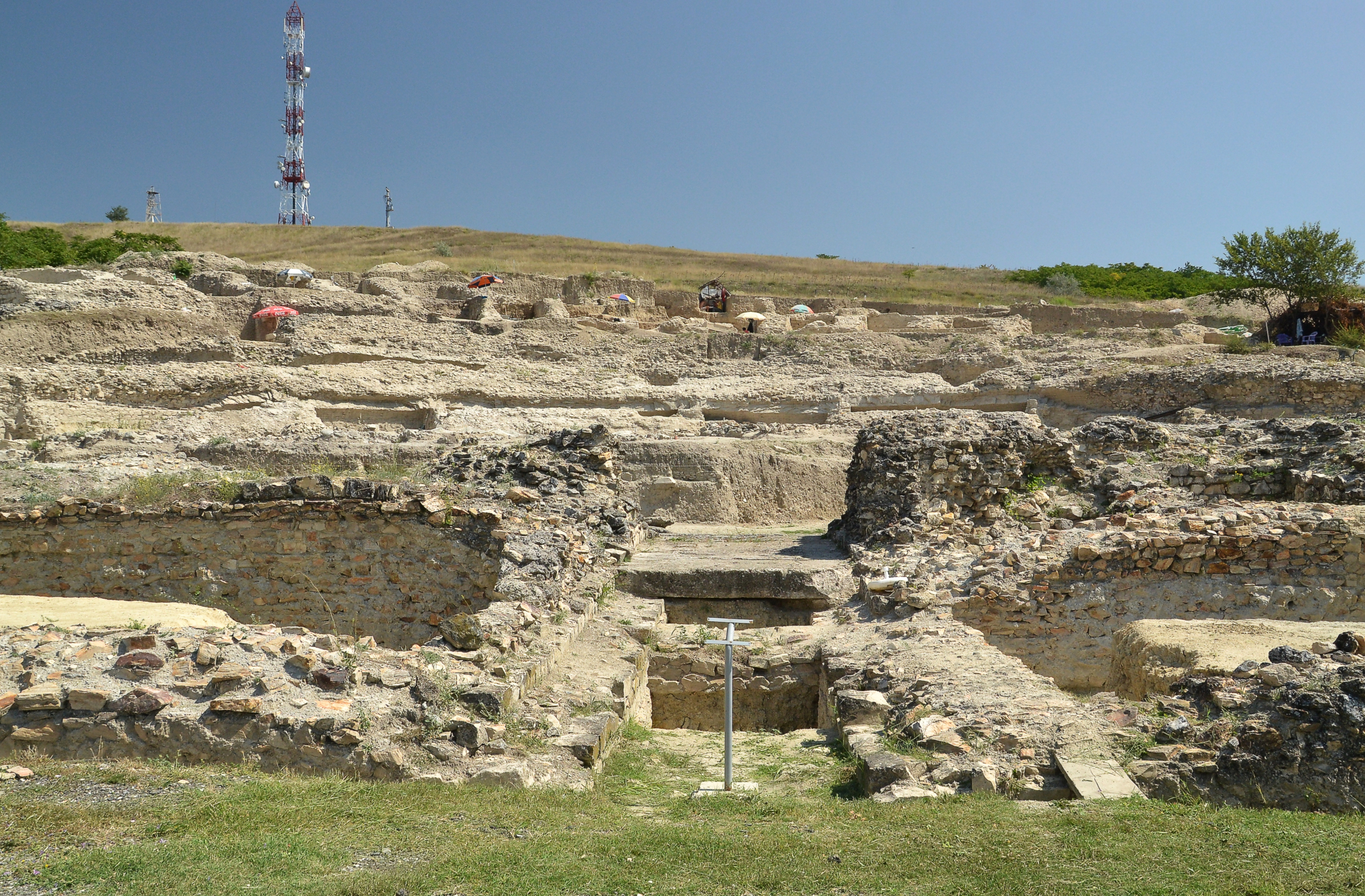
Ancient theatre of Scupi

Scupi became the capital of Dardania, which extended from Naissus to Bylazora, in the second century BC. The Dardanians had remained independent after the Roman conquest of Macedonia, because they had supported the Romans, hoping to enlarge their territory in this way. It is not clear when the Romans finally annexed Dardania and it seems most likely that the Dardani actually lost independence in 28 BC. Scupi grew up as a colony of legionnaires, mainly veterans of the Legio VII Claudia in the time of Domitian (AD 81–96), even though several legions of Crassus' army of 29-28 BC, may already have been stationed there, before the official imperial command in this area was instituted. Scupi was included in Moesia Superior after the province was formed in AD 6. From 272 AD, it was a colony inside the Roman province of Dardania after Dardania was established. Scupi was ravaged several times by barbarians, in AD 269 by the Goths, in 5th century by the Huns and finally in the year 518 was completely destroyed by an earthquake. Life in Scupi stopped after the earthquake and it is assumed that the people from Scupi moved to live on Kale, a hill in the center of Skopje.

The moving of the city is often connected with the founding of Justiniana Prima. Justiniana Prima was a city founded by Justinian I, who reigned over the Eastern Roman Empire in 527–565. The connection is based on the assumption that the village Taor which is located near Skopje is Tauresium, Justinian I's birthplace, and by the description of Justiniana Prima by Procopius that suits Skopje's fortress (Kale), the Old Bazaar and the aqueduct which are still landmarks of Skopje.

He therefore built a wall of small compass about this place in the form of a square, placing a tower at each corner, and caused it to be called, as it actually is, Tetrapyrgia. And close by this place he built a very notable city which he named Justiniana Prima, thus paying a debt of gratitude to the home that fostered him. In that place also he constructed an aqueduct and so caused the city to be abundantly supplied with ever-running water. And many other enterprises were carried out by the founder of this city - works of great size and worthy of especial note. For to enumerate the churches is not easy, and it is impossible to tell in words of the lodgings for magistrates, the great stoas, the fine marketplaces, the fountains, the streets, the baths, the shops. In brief, the city is both great and populous and blessed in every way.

— Procopius, description of Justiniana Prima in 'The Buildings'

== Excavations ==
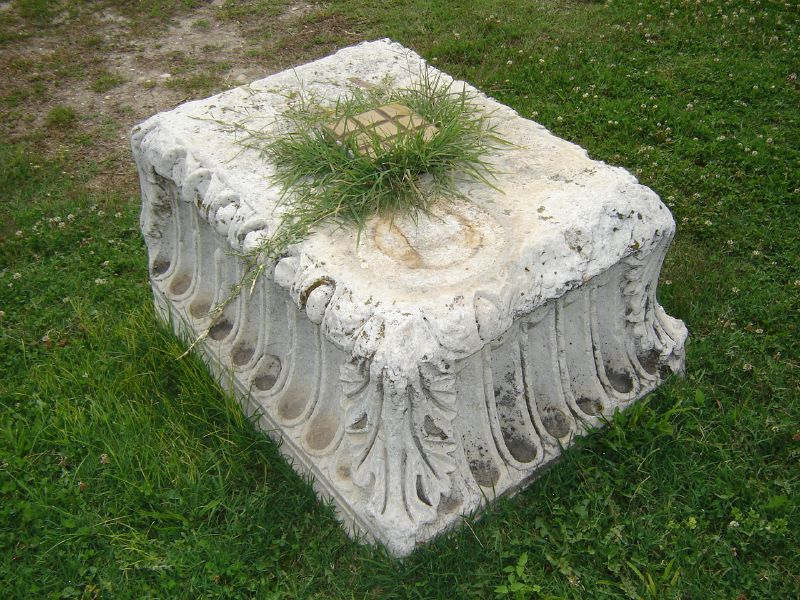
Pillar capital in Scupi.

The excavations on the archaeological site started in the period between the two World Wars. Radoslav Gruić discovered the early Christian basilica in 1925 and the most important discovery was made by Nikola Vulić, a Serbian archeologist, when he found the ancient Macedonian theater. Nikola Vulić was the archeologist that published most about Scupi.

Excavations on the site were conducted in 1959–61 by Duje Rendić-Miočević that were published in 1981 and by Ivan Mikulčić, published in 1971 and 1973. According to archaeologist Mikulčić, Scupi was once twice the size of Stobi, five times larger than Heraclea near Bitola, and nine times larger than Bargala near Štip, making it the largest known Roman settlement in the region.

The Museum of the City of Skopje began new excavation and conservation work on the site from 1966 led by Milutin Garašanin. From 1980 the person responsible for the excavation and conservation work on the site is Dušanka Koraćević.

In July 2008, a well-preserved statue of the Roman goddess Venus was found. The statue measures 1.7 metres (5.6 ft) in height.

The Illyrian tribe Albanoi is attested in an ancient funeral inscription in Scupi It was excavated in 1931 by Nikola Vulić and its text was curated and published in 1982 by Borka Dragojević-Josifovska. The inscription in Latin reads "POSIS MESTYLU F[ILIUS] FL[AVIA] DELVS MVCATI F[ILIA] DOM[O] ALBANOP[OLI] IPSA DELVS" ("Posis Mestylu, son of Flavia, daughter of Delus Mucati, who comes from Albanopolis"). It dates to the end of the 1st century CE and the beginning of the 2nd century CE. Dragojević-Josifovska added two lines to the existing reading: VIVA P(OSUIT) SIBI/ ET VIRO SUO. Dragojević-Josifovska proposed that like others he had settled in Macedonia from southern Illyria.

== Buildings ==
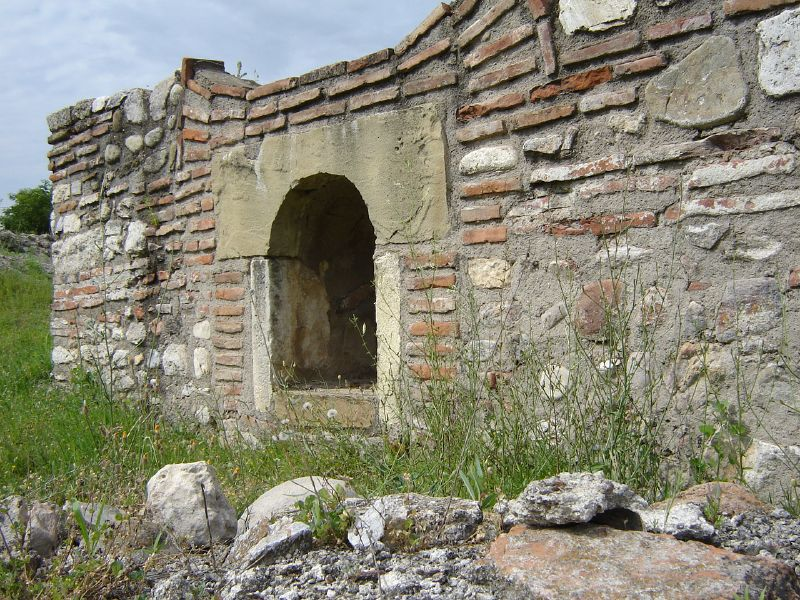
Walls in Scupi.

There are four building periods. The first is the time of the alleged camp of two legions from 168 BC. The second is the foundation of the Roman colonia that ended with the invasion by the Goths in AD 269. The third period is most distinguished and is represented by the remains of one civil basilica, a complex of baths (thermae) and one townhouse. The last, the fourth period that begins roughly after the invasion by the Ostrogoths from AD 472 or 489 is represented by remains of an early Christian basilica and a townhouse with apse. Scupi was completely destroyed in AD 518. Today, only the early Christian basilica, the civil basilica, the baths and townhouses along the road are recognizable. The Roman theatre is completely decayed.

=== Roman theatre ===
The theater is estimated to have been built in the 2nd century AD because of the signs Colonia Scupi Aelia on the seats. It is assumed that the theater was built for Hadrian, the Roman emperor, who was visiting the Balkan cities. The decoration of the Roman theater was on the highest level, comparable to the best in the world from that time. Ivan Mikulčić writes that in the 1000 years of the ancient period, there is no building that has reached the refined level of art as in the Roman theater in Scupi. Nikola Vulić claims that the theater in Scupi is larger than the one in Stobi, and Duje Rendić-Miočević claim that is the largest on the territory of modern North Macedonia. The theater was used only for theater performances, comedies and tragedies. There is no architectural proof that the theater was used for gladiator games as it is the case in the theater in Stobi.

Archaeologists believe that much of the theater's original stone was stripped and transported to the Kale fortress following the 518 CE earthquake, when residents relocated to the new settlement on the hill.

== Modern restoration efforts and site condition ==
In 2016, Scupi was officially designated a cultural heritage site of exceptional significance, introducing legal protections against improper development. That year, the government led by the VMRO-DPMNE party launched a €7.1 million project to restore the Roman amphitheatre with a 9,000-seat capacity and make the site more accessible. The initiative was part of a wider "Megaproject" campaign to revive historic areas. However, in 2017, a newly elected Social Democratic government halted the project, citing concerns over the authenticity of the planned reconstructions. Only about 7.5% of the contract was fulfilled before it was canceled, and subsequent lawsuits filed by the contractor were unsuccessful.

As of July 2025, no new development plans for Scupi had materialized. When asked by Balkan Insight whether a new development plan existed, the Ministry of Culture and Tourism stated that it was not responsible for site management and referred inquiries to the Skopje City Museum. The ministry only provides support through competitive cultural project grants. Annual funding has dwindled to just a few thousand euros, and the Skopje City Museum, which manages the site, operates with limited staff and resources. The site is rarely included in tourist itineraries and is accessible only by city bus No. 21, which runs approximately once per hour. The surrounding area is marred by illegal dumping, including discarded electronics and construction debris, much of it on adjacent private land. Museum staff have cited insufficient funding, institutional inaction, and understaffing as key barriers to the site’s maintenance and development.

== See also ==
- Tabula Peutingeriana (image; Scupi marked as a city on the Peutinger table)
- Stobi
- Heraclea Lyncestis
- Nikola Vulić

== Sources ==
- Koraćević, Dušanka (2002) Scupi. Skopje: Museum of the city of Skopje
- Procopius. (1940). The Buildings, Book IV (Part 1). Retrieved from the website.
