= Adrastea =

Adrastea, Adrasteia, Adrestea or Adrestia may refer to:

- Adrasteia or Adrestia (mythology)
- Adrastea (moon), the second of Jupiter's known moons
- Adrastea, an informal name borne by Jupiter XII (now Ananke (moon)) from 1955 to 1975
- Adrastea: Events and Characters of the 18th Century, a literary work by Johann Gottfried Herder
- 239 Adrastea, an asteroid
- Adrasteia (Mysia), a region in northwest Asia Minor
