= Odiidae =

Scientific classification
- Kingdom: Animalia
- Phylum: Arthropoda
- Clade: Pancrustacea
- Class: Malacostraca
- Order: Amphipoda
- Superfamily: Iphimedioidea
- Family: Odiidae; Coleman & Barnard, 1991

Genera
- See text

Family of crustaceans

Odiidae is a family of amphipods, sometimes included in the family Ochlesidae. It includes the following genera:

- Antarctodius Berge, Vader & Coleman, 1999
- Cryptodius Moore, 1992
- Imbrexodius Moore, 1992
- Odius Liljeborg, 1865
- Postodius Hirayama, 1983
