= Shaulladany family =

Asteroid family

The Shaulladany family (010) is a small collisional asteroid family of at least 13 known asteroids, named for one of its members, the 16-kilometre (9.9 mi)-across asteroid 247341 Shaulladany (although its largest member is 37519 Amphios). It lies within the larger dynamical group of Jupiter trojans, a group of asteroids in an orbital resonance with Jupiter such that they stay about 60 degrees ahead of/behind the planet in its orbit at all times in the Lagrange points L4 and L5, with the Shaulladany family being part of the trailing cloud around L5, also known as the Trojan camp. All members of the family are dark (assumed to be C-type asteroids) with albedos of around 0.09.

An asteroid family is a group of physically related asteroids usually created by a collision with an original larger asteroid, with the fragments continuing on similar orbits to the original. This is distinct from a dynamical group in that the members of a dynamical group only share similar orbits because of gravitational interactions with planets, which concentrate asteroids in a particular orbital range. Members of the Shaulladany family are both part of the wider Trojan dynamical group, and fragments of 37519 Amphios. The family is considered a non-catastrophic asteroid family because 37519 Amphios, its largest member, makes up a majority of the family's total mass, rather than simply being the largest of a number of fragments each making up a small fraction of the original destroyed asteroid.

== Large members ==

- 37519 Amphios: 0.186 (49.5%)
- (76826) 2000 SW131: 0.0544 (14.5%)
- 247341 Shaulladany: 0.0241 (6.4%)
- (291807) 2006 KG89: 0.0178 (4.7%)
- (337804) 2001 UN216: 0.0142 (3.8%)
- (338343) 2002 WY19: 0.0104 (2.8%)
- (486695) 2013 WP63: 0.0098 (2.6%)
- (376867) 2001 TN222: 0.00927 (2.5%)
- (420313) 2011 YQ62: 0.00902 (2.4%)
- (347099) 2010 HO21: 0.00865 (2.3%)
- all other members: 0.0321 (8.5%)
Mass distribution of the Shaulladany family (assuming similar densities)

The 10 brightest Shaulladany family members
Name	Abs. Mag	Size (km)	proper a (AU)	proper e	proper i
37519 Amphios	11.15	33	5.2174	0.044	25.164
(76826) 2000 SW131	12.04	21	5.2193	0.034	24.596
247341 Shaulladany	12.63	16	5.2181	0.041	24.561
(291807) 2006 KG89	12.85	18	5.2206	0.045	24.324
(337804) 2001 UN216	13.01	15	5.2180	0.037	24.146
(338343) 2002 WY19	13.24	10	5.2201	0.034	24.392
(486695) 2013 WP63	13.28	9.8	?	0.049	23.785
(376867) 2001 TN222	13.32	13	5.2197	0.039	24.055
(420313) 2011 YQ62	13.34	9.5	?	0.031	24.067
(347099) 2010 HO21	13.37	9.4	5.2178	0.042	24.878
