= Teria =

Teria may refer to:

- Teria, an ancient city.
- Teria, an alternative name for the Aegiale hesperiaris.
