= Pityeia =

Pityeia or Pityea (Πιτύεια) was a town of ancient Mysia, on the coast of the Propontis, between Parium and Priapus. It is mentioned in the Trojan Battle Order by Homer in the Iliad. It is also mentioned by Apollonius of Rhodes, Strabo, and Stephanus of Byzantium. It is said to have derived its name from the firs which grew there in abundance.

Its site is unlocated.
