= Paesus =

Ancient city of Asia Minor

Coordinates: 40°24′01″N 26°47′14″E

Paesus or Paisos (Hittite: Apaššawa, Ancient Greek: Παισός), in the Trojan Battle Order in Homer's Iliad called Apaesus or Apaisos (Ἀπαισός), was a town and polis (city-state) on the coast of the ancient Troad, at the entrance of the Propontis, between Lampsacus and Parium. The city of Apaššawa from the Hittite documents is identified as Paesus. In the Iliad, Amphius, son of Selagus, was said to be from Paesus. At one period, it received colonists from Miletus. It suffered Persian occupation during the Ionian Revolt. In Strabo's time, the town was destroyed, and its inhabitants had transferred themselves to Lampsacus, which was likewise a Milesian colony. The town derived its name from the small river Paesus, on which it was situated. It was a member of the Delian League and appears in tribute lists of Athens between 453/2 and 430/29 BCE.

Its site is located 6 miles (9.7 km) northeast of Çardak, Asiatic Turkey.
