= Heraclea Lyncestis =

Ancient Greek city in Macedon

- Herakleia Lynkestis
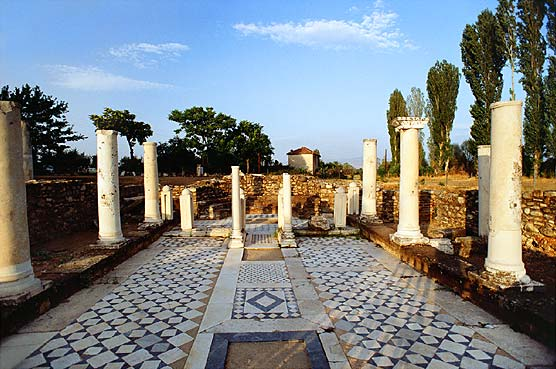
- The Byzantine "small basilica" at Heraclea Lyncestis

- Location within North Macedonia
- 41°00′39″N 21°20′33″E
- Type: Settlement
- Periods: Hellenistic to Byzantine
- Cultures: Ancient Greek, Roman
- Location: Bitola, Pelagonia Statistical Region, North Macedonia
- Region: Lynkestis

History
- Built: Middle of the 4th century BC
- Built by: Philip II of Macedon

Heraclea Lyncestis, also transliterated Herakleia Lynkestis (Ancient Greek: Ἡράκλεια Λυγκηστίς; Latin: Heraclea Lyncestis; Macedonian: Хераклеја Линкестис), was an ancient Greek city in Macedon, ruled later by the Romans. Its ruins are situated 2 km (1.2 mi) south of the present-day town of Bitola, North Macedonia. In the early Christian period, Heraclea was an important episcopal seat and a waypoint on the Via Egnatia that once linked Byzantium with Rome through the Adriatic seaport of Dyrrachium. Some of its bishops are mentioned in synods in Serdica and other nearby towns. The city was gradually abandoned in the 6th century AD following an earthquake and Slavic invasions.

== Foundation by Philip II ==
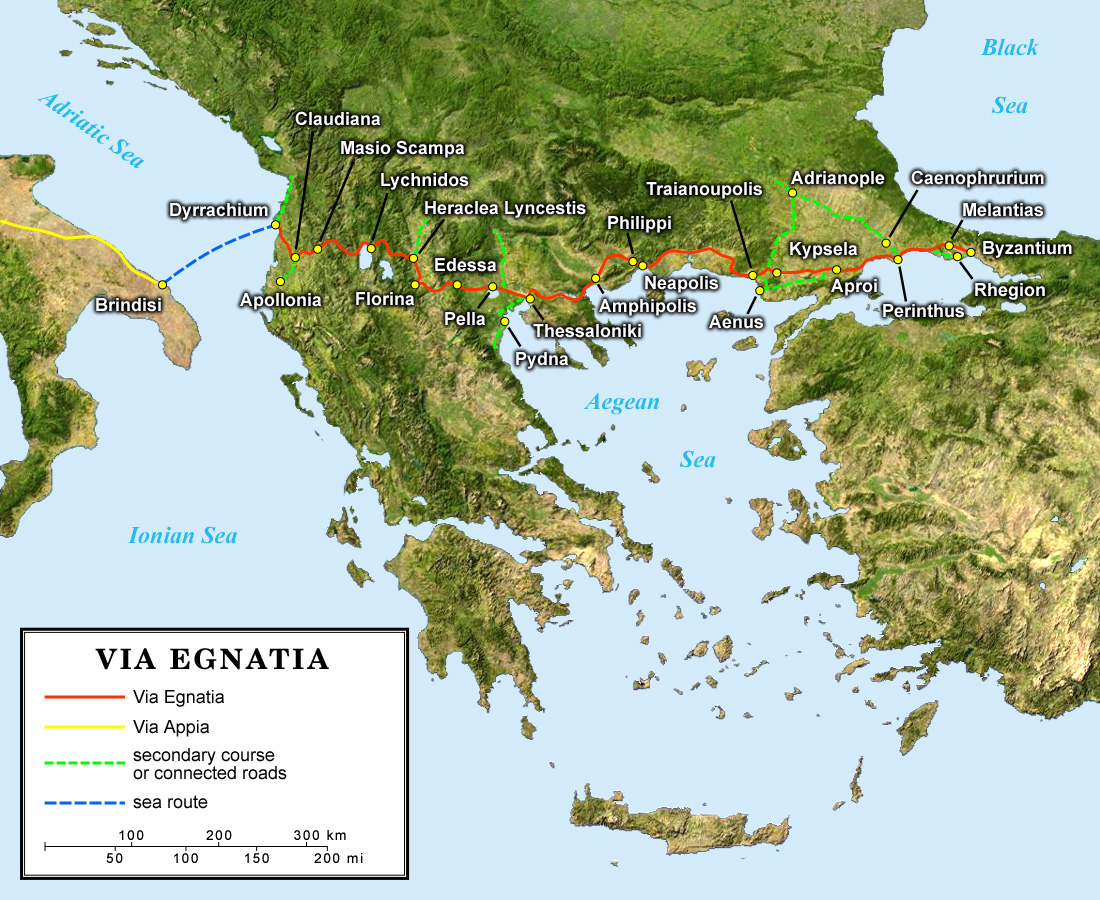
Heraclea Lycestis on the Via Egnatia.

It was founded by Philip II of Macedon in the middle of the 4th century BC. The city was named in honor of the mythological hero Heracles. The name Lynkestis originates from the name of the ancient kingdom, conquered by Philip, where the city was built.

Heraclea was a strategically important town in classical antiquity, as it controlled one of the major east-west routes between Illyria and Macedonia. Philip' s founding of Heraclea prevented Illyrian incursions from the west into Macedon. The city was involved in the Macedonian Wars until the middle of the 2nd century BC, when the Romans conquered Macedon and destroyed its political power.

== Roman period ==
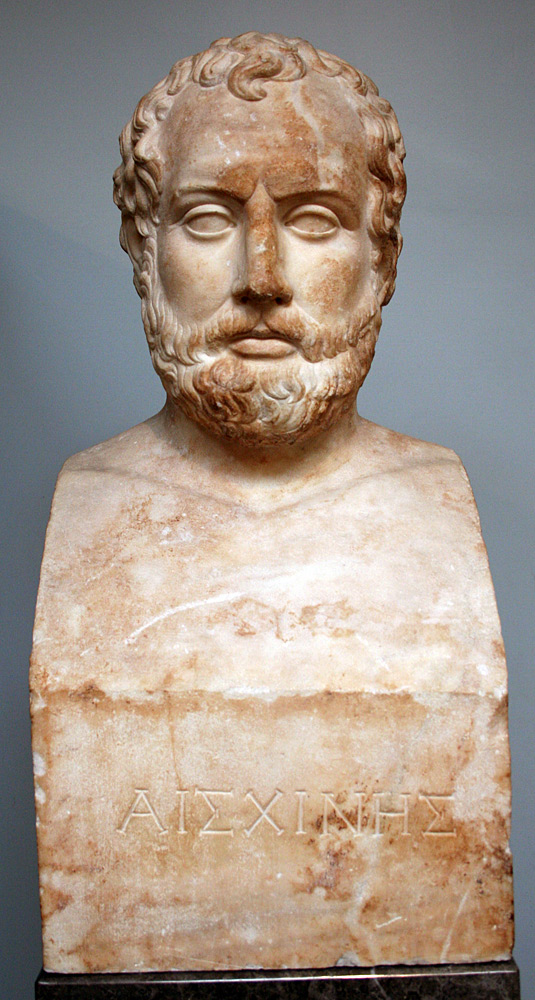
Marble bust of Aeschines from Heraclea Lyncestis dating from the Roman period (120-130 AD), donated to the British Museum by the English explorer William Martin Leake

The Romans divided Macedonia into four regions and Heraclea became part of Macedonia Prima. The Via Egnatia, the main Roman road in the Southern Balkans, passed through Heraclea. The city became a significant stop and was consequently able to maintain its wealth. Objects discovered from the time of Roman rule in Heraclea are votive monuments, a portico, thermae (baths), a theatre and town walls. The Roman emperor Hadrian built a theatre in the center of the town, on a hill, when many buildings in the Roman province of Macedonia were being restored. It began being used during the reign of Antoninus Pius. Discovered in 1931, a small bone ticket for a seat in the 14th (out of 20) row is the earliest known proof of the theatre's existence. The theatre itself was not discovered until 1968. Inside the theatre there were three animal cages and in the western part a tunnel. The theatre went out of use during the late 4th century AD, when gladiator fights in the Roman Empire were banned, due to the spread of Christianity, the formulation of the Eastern Roman Empire, and the abandonment of, what was then perceived as, pagan rituals and entertainment.

== Late Antiquity and Byzantine periods ==
In the early Byzantine period (4th to 6th centuries AD) Heraclea was an important episcopal centre. Some of its bishops have been noted in the acts of the Church Councils as bishop Evagrius of Heraclea in the Acts of the Sardica Council from 343 AD. A small and a great basilica, the bishop's residence, and a funerary basilica and the necropolis are some of the remains of this period. Three naves in the Great Basilica are covered with mosaics of very rich floral and figurative iconography; these well preserved mosaics are often regarded as fine examples of the early Christian art period. Other bishops from Heraclea are known between 4th and 6th century AD as bishop Quintilinus mentioned in the Acts of the Second Council of Ephesus, from 449 AD. The city was sacked by Ostrogoth/Visigoth forces, commanded by Theodoric the Great in 472 AD and, despite a large gift to him from the city's bishop, it was sacked again in 479 AD. It was restored in the late 5th and early 6th century. When an earthquake struck in 518 AD, the inhabitants of Heraclea gradually abandoned the city. Subsequently, at the eve of the 7th century, the Dragovites, a Slavic tribe pushed down from the north by the Avars, settled in the area. The last coin issue dates from ca. 585, which suggests that the city was finally captured by the Slavs. As result, in place of the deserted city theatre several huts were built.

=== Mosaics in the basilicas ===
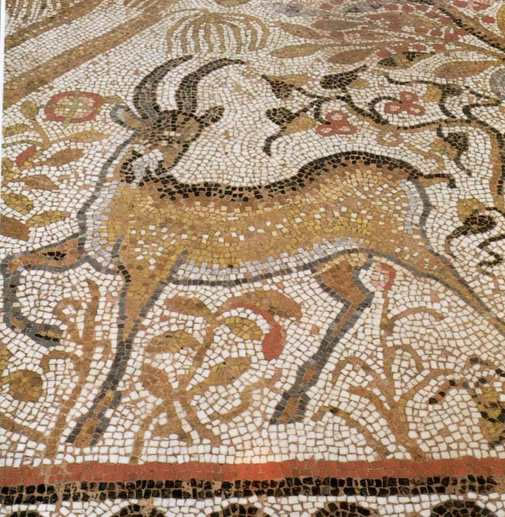
Great Basilica, narthex mosaic - detail

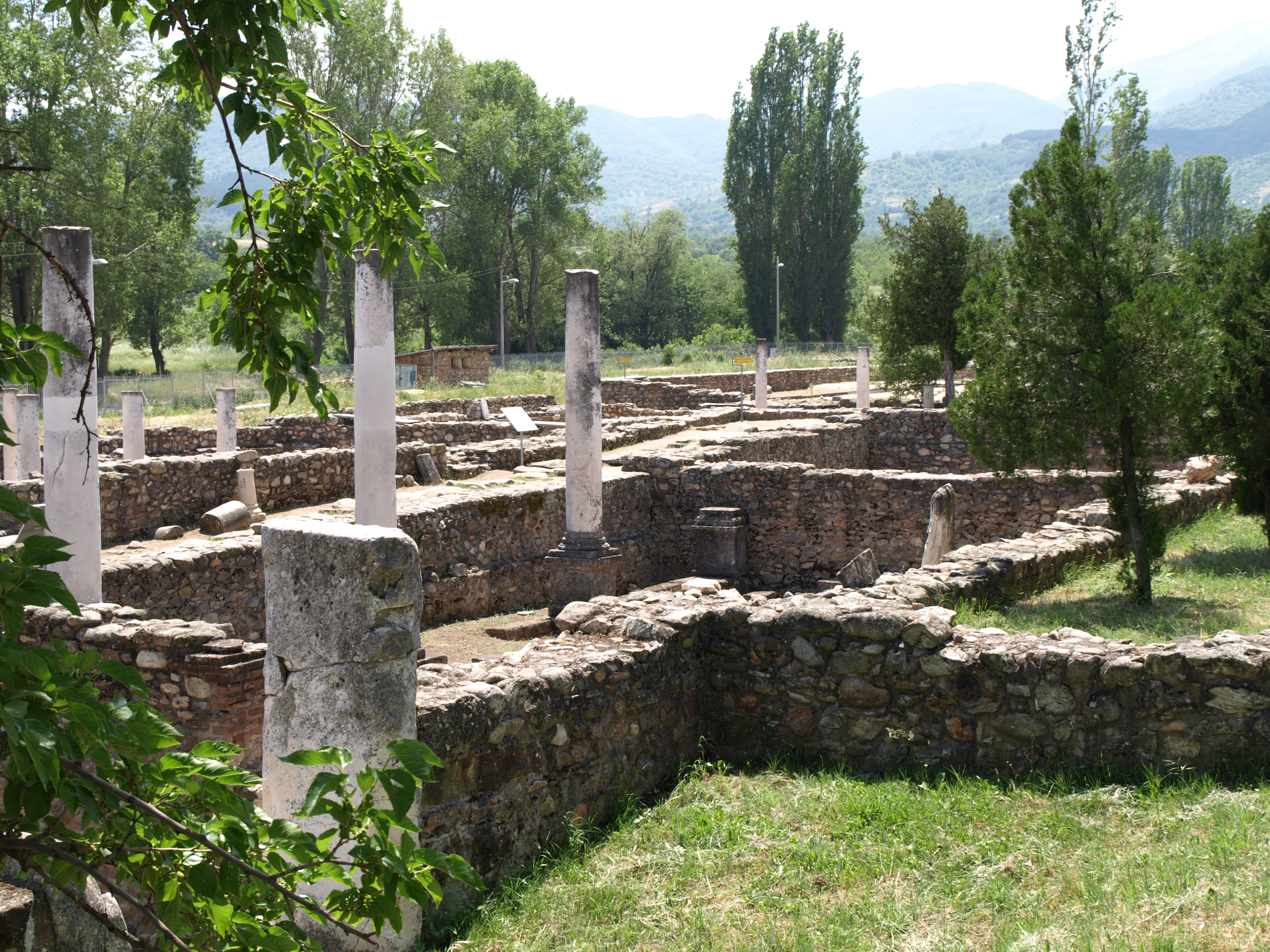
Ruins at Heraclea

The so-called Small Basilica was discovered in excavations made before the outbreak of World War II between 1936 and 1938. At first it was thought to be an ancient palace, but in the later research from 1960 to 1964, it became clear that it was an early Christian basilica. There is a decorated floor mosaic laid in the technique of "opus sectile" within the basilica and several rooms have been unearthed. The first room was used for baptizing, and the second room has a floor mosaic made in "opus tessellatum" technique. After the creation of the complex Great Basilica, the function of these rooms was changed. By discovering the walls, architectonic plastic and floors were reconstructed electronically.

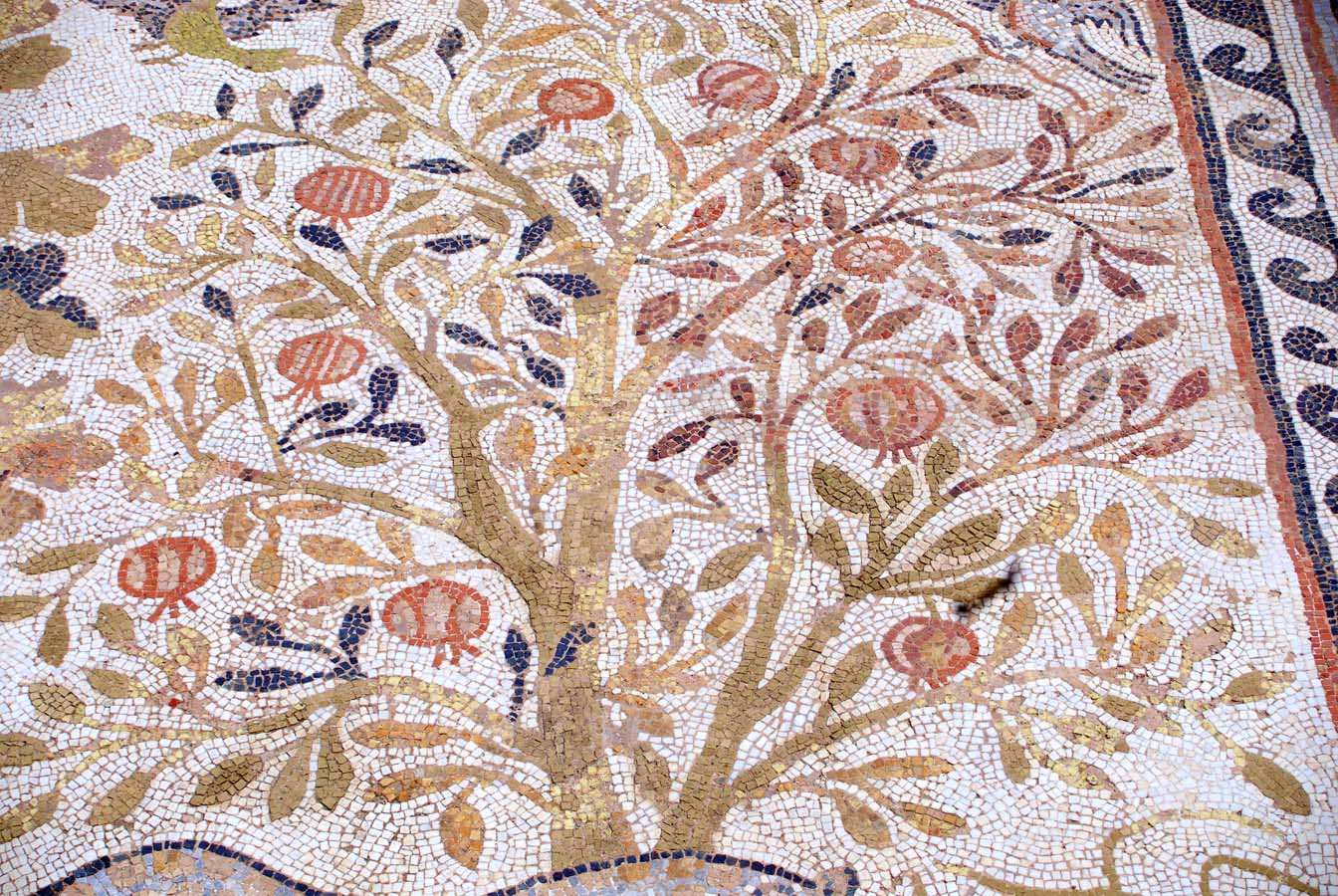
Great Basilica, narthex mosaic - pomegranate tree

The Great Basilica is a monumental building with a room of open porch colonnades, a room of exonarthex, one of narthex, two north annexes, and a room of three south annexes. The floors of these rooms have mosaics with geometric and floral designs. The mosaic in the narthex is of early Byzantine art, a big composition at a size of 100 m (328 ft). There are birds, trees, bushes, a red dog, which is a symbol of paradise, and animals beasts as a domain of the earth. This mosaic dates from the end of the 6th century. The Great Basilica is built on top of another pre-existing one and it is believed to have been built sometime between the 4th and 6th century.

The Great Basilica's mosaic floor is depicted on the reverse of the Macedonian 5000 denars banknote, issued in 1996.

The Episcopacy Residence was excavated between 1970 and 1975. The western part was discovered first and the southern side is near the town wall. The luxury rooms are located in the eastern part. The 2nd, 3rd and 4th rooms all have mosaic floors. Between the 3rd and 4th rooms there is a hole that led to the eastern entrance of the residence. The hole was purposefully created between the 4th and 6th century.

== See also ==
- Stobi
- Nikola Vulić
- List of ancient Greek cities
- Heraclea Sintica
