= Hecamede =

Character from Greek mythology

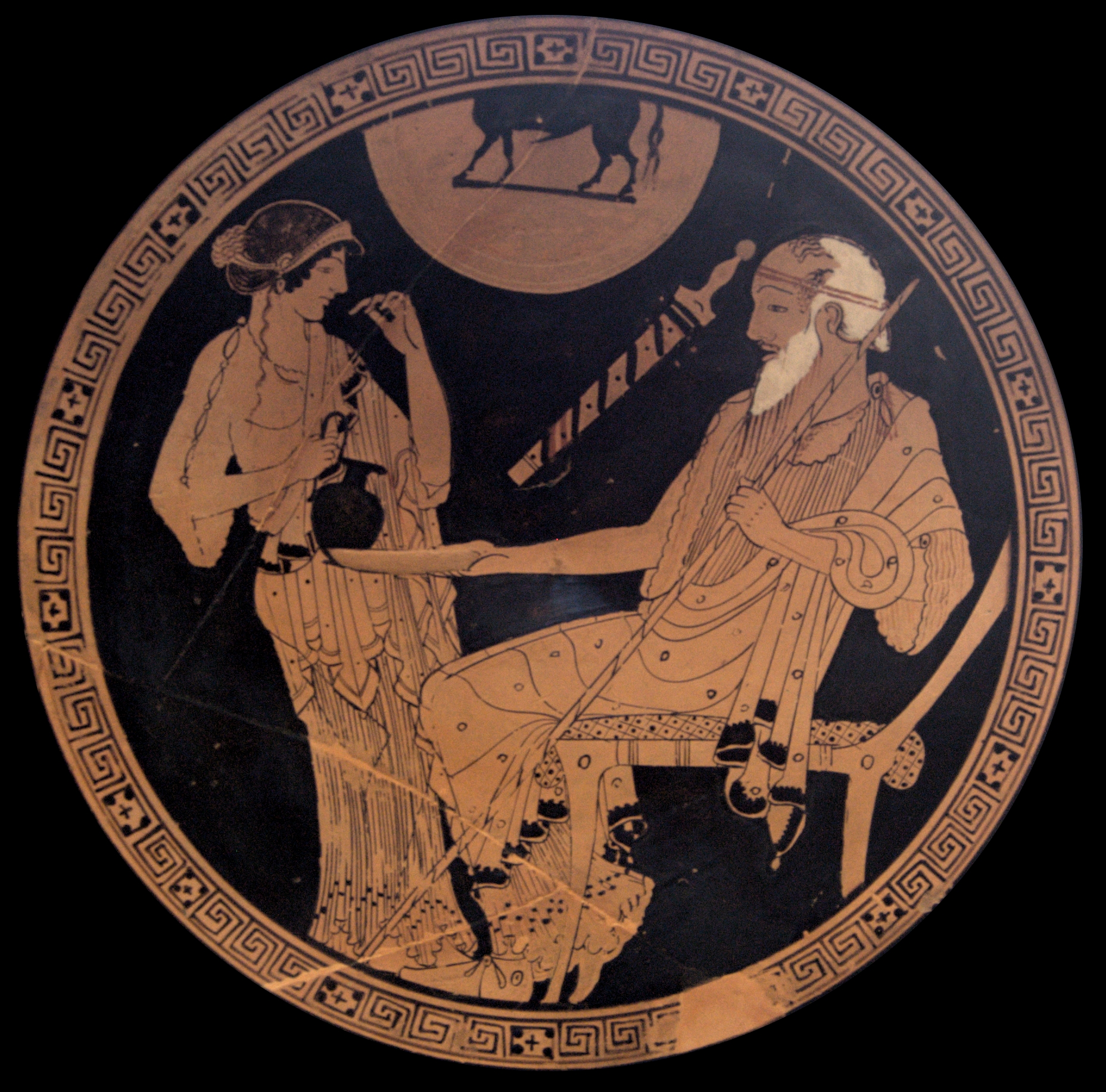
For some, this cup shows Hecamede mixing kykeon for Nestor. Tondo of an Attic red-figure cup, ca. 490 BC. From Vulci.

In the Iliad, Hecamede (Ancient Greek: Ἑκαμήδη), daughter of Arsinoos, was captured from the isle of Tenedos and given as captive to King Nestor. In her most prolonged mention, she serves Kykeon made from Pramnian wine, a medicinal drink, to Nestor and Machaon.
