= Stobi railway station =

Railway station in Gradsko Municipality, North Macedonia

Stobi ЖС „Стоби“
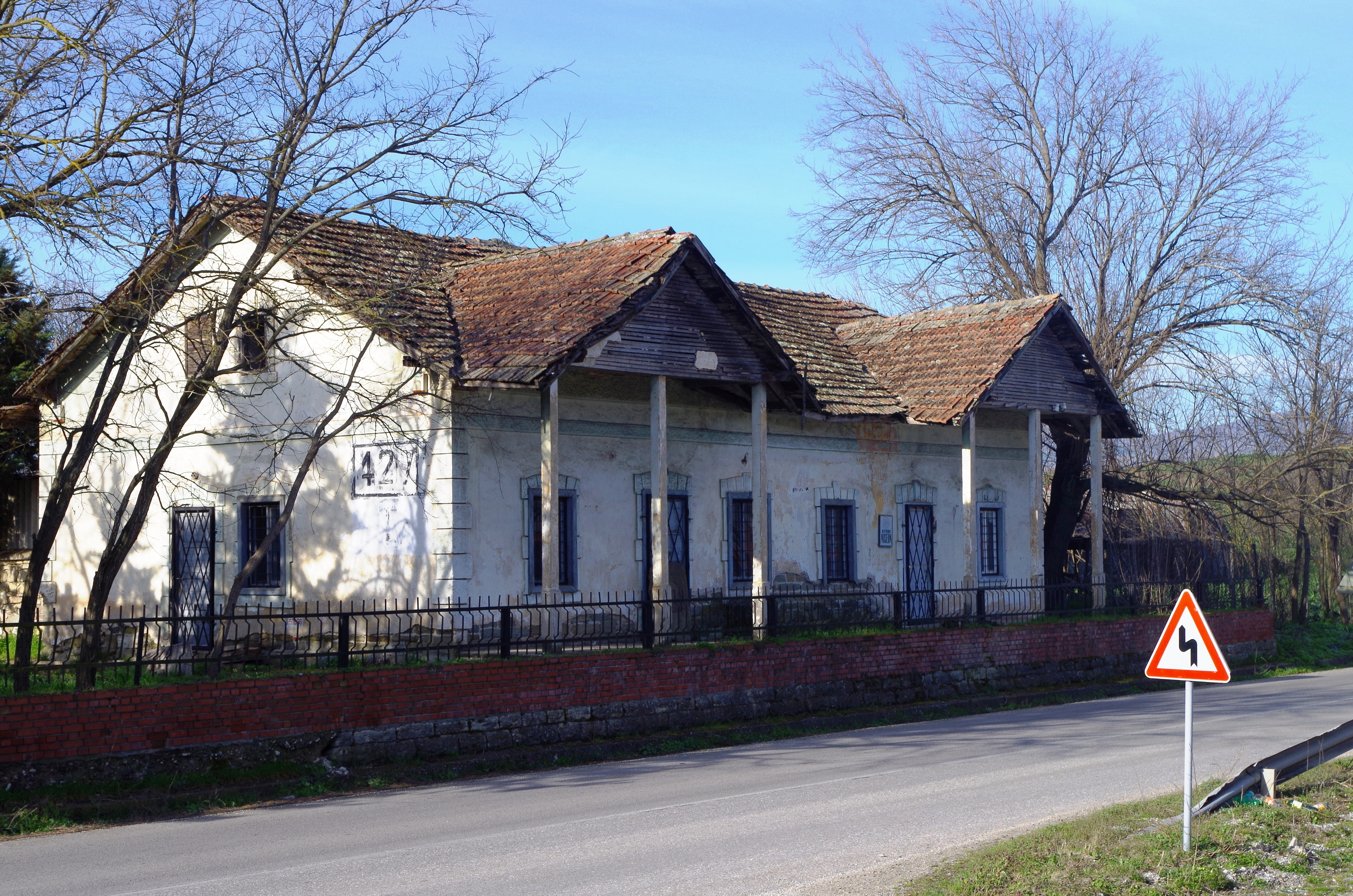
- Station building in 2015

General information
- Platforms: 1
Location

The Stobi railway station is located on railway corridor 10, near the ancient archeological site of Stobi, in the southern part of North Macedonia.

The train station has only one platform.

It is the fourth railway station from Veles, from which it is 31.9 km away, with the main railway station in Skopje 82.8 km away. Domestic trains on the Skopje – Gevgelija line, as well as international trains on the Skopje - Thessaloniki and Belgrade - Thessaloniki lines regularly pass through the station.

== Heritage ==
A small museum existed at the train station, opened in 1972. Pottery, lamps, coins, metal objects and terracotta figurines were displayed in five showcases. The building was in a poor state, forcing closure of the museum in 2009.

An announcement in 2015 confirmed that the old station building would become a museum space/visitor’s center, with the hopes it would improve the visitor experience at the site. A similar project was planned 10 years before, but nothing was done with the location.

The railway station will become a museum that will house a lapidarium and some of the artefacts found. The project will have two phases: first will be a rehabilitation of the building, replacement of the roof structure and of the façade. Next work will be done inside; the lower level will see the installation of display cases for exhibits, while the upper floor will be converted into a small conference hall that can be used for educational purposes or to project films. In the back of the building, facing the archeological site, an open space with a porch is planned where the lapidarium with stone monuments, sculptures and inscriptions will be located. The project will be led by the National Institution "Stobi".

In the middle of the site will be a cafeteria, facing the facility. The project was approved in 2015, budgeted for a total of 1.8 million denars allotment for completion of the first phase of the project, which was to be fully completed by 2016.
