= Athenaeus =

Late 2nd/early 3rd century Greek rhetorician and grammarian

Athenaeus of Naucratis
- Born: Late 2nd century AD; Naucratis, Roman Empire (modern-day Egypt)
- Died: Early 3rd century AD; Unknown
- Occupations: Writer; grammarian; rhetorician
- Writing career
- Notable work: Deipnosophistae

Athenaeus of Naucratis (/ˌæθəˈniːəs/; Ancient Greek: Ἀθήναιος ὁ Nαυκρατίτης or Nαυκράτιος, Athēnaios Naukratitēs or Naukratios; Latin: Athenaeus Naucratita) was an ancient Greek rhetorician and grammarian, flourishing about the end of the 2nd and beginning of the 3rd century AD. The Suda says only that he lived in the times of Marcus Aurelius, but the contempt with which he speaks of Commodus, who died in 192, implies that he survived that emperor. He was a contemporary of Adrantus.

Athenaeus himself states that he was the author of a treatise on the thratta, a type of fish mentioned by Archippus and other comic poets, and of a history of the Syrian kings. Both works are lost. Of his works, only the fifteen-volume Deipnosophistae mostly survives.

== The Deipnosophistae ==
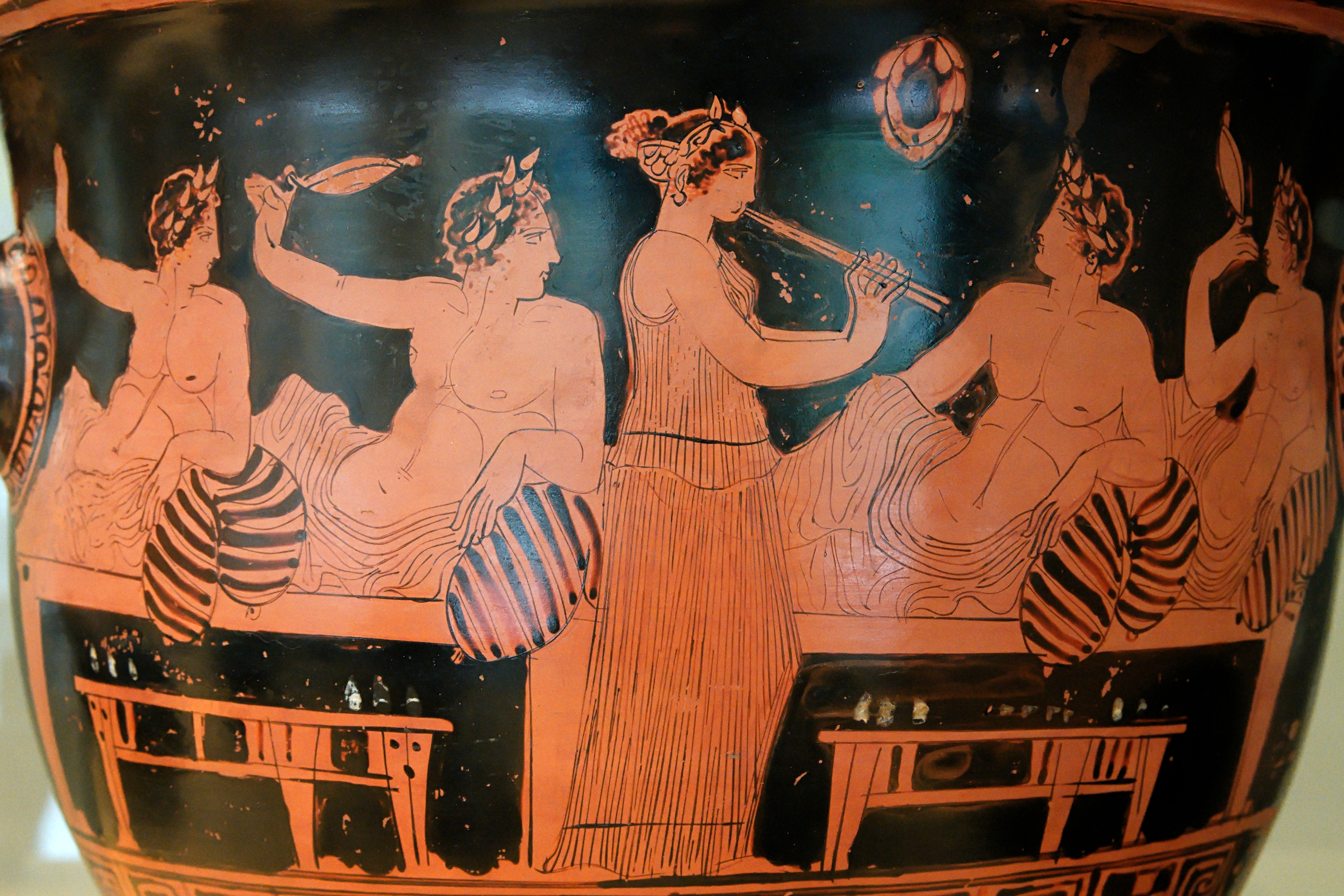
The Deipnosophistes belongs to the literary tradition inspired by the use of the Greek banquet. Banqueters playing Kottabos while a musician plays the Aulos, decorated by the artist 'Nicias'/'Nikias'.

The Deipnosophistae, which means 'dinner-table philosophers', survives in fifteen books. The first two books, and parts of the third, eleventh and fifteenth, are extant only in epitome, but otherwise the work seems to be complete. It is an immense store-house of information, chiefly on matters connected with famous cooks, dining, but also containing remarks on music, songs, dances, philosophy, games, courtesans, and luxury. Nearly 800 writers and 2,500 separate works are referred to by Athenaeus; one of his characters (not necessarily to be identified with the historical author himself) boasts of having read 800 plays of Athenian Middle Comedy alone. Were it not for Athenaeus, much valuable information about the ancient world would be missing, and many ancient Greek authors such as Archestratus would be almost entirely unknown. Book XIII, for example, is an important source for the study of sexuality in classical and Hellenistic Greece, and a rare fragment of Theognetus' work survives in 3.63.

The Deipnosophistae professes to be an account given by an individual named Athenaeus to his friend Timocrates of a banquet held at the house of Larensius (Λαρήνσιος; in Latin: Larensis), a wealthy book-collector and patron of the arts. It is thus a dialogue within a dialogue, after the manner of Plato, but the conversation extends to enormous length. The topics for discussion generally arise from the course of the dinner itself, but extend to literary and historical matters of every description, including abstruse points of grammar. The guests supposedly quote from memory. The actual sources of the material preserved in the Deipnosophistae remain obscure, but much of it probably comes at second hand from early scholars.

The twenty-four named guests include individuals called Galen and Ulpian, but they are all probably fictitious personages, and the majority take no part in the conversation. If the character Ulpian is identical with the famous jurist, the Deipnosophistae may have been written after his death in 223; but the jurist was murdered by the Praetorian Guard, whereas Ulpian in Athenaeus dies a natural death.

The complete version of the text, with the gaps noted above, is preserved in only one manuscript, conventionally referred to as A. The epitomized version of the text is preserved in two manuscripts, conventionally known as C and E. The standard edition of the text is Olson's Teubner. The standard numbering is drawn largely from Casaubon.

The encyclopaedist and author Sir Thomas Browne wrote a short essay upon Athenaeus which reflects a revived interest in the Banquet of the Learned amongst scholars during the 17th century following its publication in 1612 by the Classical scholar Isaac Casaubon.
