= Tereia =

Tereia or Teria (Ancient Greek: Τήρεια) is the name of one or two ancient cities of the coastal zone of the Propontis of Asia Minor.

It was part of the Delian League since in epigraphic evidence documenting a tributary decree of Athens of the year 425/4 BCE, Tereia is mentioned within the district of Hellespont. It also appears in a tributary decree of the year 422/1 BCE.

Its exact location is unknown but due to epigraphic evidence it has been inferred that it should be located east of Cyzicus and near Myrlea. However, Strabo mentions a Tereia located in the plain of Adrasteia, as well as the city of Pityusa (the later Lampsacus), west of Cyzicus, so it could be two different places with the same name. Perhaps it is related to the Mount Tereia mentioned by Homer in the Trojan Battle Order in the Iliad, about which Strabo points out that some believed that it was located on a hill located at forty stadia from Lampsacus where there was a sanctuary to the Mother of the Gods which was called "Tereia's sanctuary".
