= Adrasteia (mythology) =

Set of mythological Greek characters

In Greek mythology, Adrasteia (/ˌædrəˈstiːə/; Ancient Greek: Ἀδράστεια (Ionic Greek: Ἀδρήστεια), "inescapable"), Adrastea, Adrestea or Adrestia (Ἀδρήστεια) may refer to:

- Adrasteia, a nymph who helped raise the infant Zeus.
- An epithet for Nemesis, Goddess of Vengeance.

== See also ==
- Adrastea, a name for the Orphic goddess Ananke.
