= Ochlesidae =

Scientific classification
- Kingdom: Animalia
- Phylum: Arthropoda
- Clade: Pancrustacea
- Class: Malacostraca
- Order: Amphipoda
- Parvorder: Amphilochidira
- Superfamily: Iphimedioidea
- Family: Ochlesidae; Stebbing, 1910

Genera
- See text

Family of crustaceans

Ochlesidae is a family of amphipods. They are very small, often less than 1.5 millimetres (0.06 in) long, and are found mainly in tropical and subtropical areas of the Southern Hemisphere. The family Odiidae has sometimes been subsumed into Ochlesidae.

Four genera are included in the family:

- Curidia Thomas, 1983
- Meraldia Barnard & Karaman, 1987
- Ochlesis Stebbing, 1910
- Ochlesodius Ledoyer, 1982
