= Talaemenes =

In Greek mythology, Talaemenes (Ancient Greek: Ταλαιμένους or Ταλαιμένεος) was the father of Mesthles and Antiphus by a Gygaean nymph (Gygaea). His sons led the Maeonians during the Trojan War. The Meiones were Lydian people whose city is today's Sardis.
