= Arisba =

Ancient city of Troad

Coordinates: 40°11′59″N 26°32′32″E

Arisba or Arisbe (Ancient Greek: Ἀρίσβη; Eth. Ἀρισβαίος), was a town of Mysia. Its site is tentatively located at Musakoy in Asiatic Turkey.

== History ==
=== Late Bronze Age ===
At the end of the Late Bronze Age, in connection with the Trojan War, it was mentioned by Homer in the same line with Sestos and Abydus.

=== Iron Age ===
It was between Percote and Abydus, a colony of Mytilene, founded by Scamandrius and Ascanius, son of Aeneas. It was a member of the Delian League.

=== Classical Age ===
==== Hellenistic period ====
The army of Alexander the Great mustered here after crossing the Hellespont. When the wandering Gauls passed over into Asia, on the invitation of Attalus I, they occupied Arisba, but were soon defeated, in 216 BCE, by Prusias I of Bithynia. In Strabo's time, the place was almost forgotten.

==== Roman period ====
There are coins of Arisbe from the Roman emperor Trajan's time (early 2nd century), and also autonomous coins.
