= Mesthles =

In Greek mythology, Mesthles (Ancient Greek: Μέσθλης, romanized: Mésthlēs) was one of the Trojan Leaders.

== Family ==
Mesthles was the son of Talaemenes and a Gygaean nymph (Gygaea). He was the brother of Antiphus.

== Mythology ==
Mesthles and his brother were the captains of the Maeonians who participated in the Trojan War. The Meiones were Lydian people whose city is today's Sardis.
