= Odius (crustacean) =

Scientific classification
- Domain: Eukaryota
- Kingdom: Animalia
- Phylum: Arthropoda
- Class: Malacostraca
- Order: Amphipoda
- Family: Ochlesidae
- Genus: Odius; Liljeborg, 1865

Genus of crustaceans

Odius is a genus of amphipods belonging to the family Ochlesidae.

The species of this genus are found in Arctic regions.

Species:

- Odius carinatus (Spence Bate, 1862)
- Odius cassigerus Gurjanova, 1972
- Odius oclairi (Moore, 1992)
- Odius polarsterni (Brandt & Vassilenko, 1995)
