= Arsinoos =

In Greek mythology, the name Arsinoos or Arsinous (Ancient Greek: Ἀρσίνοος) may refer to two minor figures associated with the Trojan War:

- Arsinoos of Mysia, father of Ennomus and Chromis.
- Arsinoos of Tenedos, the "great-hearted" father of Hecamede whom the Achaeans chose for Nestor since he excelled all in counsel.
