= Adrantus =

2nd or 3rd-century Greek writer

Adrantus (Ancient Greek: Ἄδραντος), or Ardrantus or Adrastus, was a contemporary of Athenaeus in the 2nd or 3rd century AD who wrote a commentary in five books upon the work of Theophrastus, entitled Περὶ Ἠθῶν, to which he added a sixth book upon the Nicomachean Ethics of Aristotle.
