= Adrastus (mythology) =

Set of mythological Greek characters

In Greek mythology Adrastus or Adrestus (Ancient Greek: Ἄδραστος or Ἄδρηστος), (perhaps meaning "the inescapable"), usually refers to:

- Adrastus, the son of Talaus, king of Argos, and leader of the Seven against Thebes.

Other figures in Greek mythology also named Adrastus include:

- Adrastus, son of Polynices and Argia, who was the daughter of Adrastus of Argos, making this Adrastus the grandson of his namesake. He was a leader of the Mycenaeans during the Trojan War and was also counted as one of the Epigoni.
- Adrastus, father of Eurydice, the wife of King Ilus of Troy.
- Adrastus, a son of King Merops of Percote, and brother to Amphius. Along with Amphius, he led a military force from Adrastea, Apaesus, Pityeia and Tereia to the Trojan War, as allies of Troy (despite the entreaties of their father, a seer, who could foresee that death awaited them on the battlefield). He, and his brother Amphius were killed by Diomedes. Possibly the same as the Adrastus who was captured by Menelaus, and killed by Agamemnon (see below).
- Adrastus, a warrior at Troy captured by Menelaus, to whom he pleaded for his life, saying that his father was rich and would pay a large ransom for his return. Menelaus was about to have him taken prisoner when Agamemnon objected and killed him. Possibly the same as the son of King Merops of Percote (see above).
- Adrastus a warrior fighting on the side of Troy, during the Trojan War, killed by Patroclus.
- Adrastus, a Phrygian, who was the son of Gordias the son of Midas, and fled Phrigia after he accidentally killed his brother, seeking refuge at the court of Croesus in Lydia.
- Adrastus, father of Hippodamia who married Peirithous but the Centaurs attempted to carry her off.
- Adrastus, a Phrygian king who was said to have built the first temple of Nemesis, and after whom Adrasteia, a city and plain in the Troad, was said to have been named. Sometimes confused with Adrastus, the son of Talaus, king of Argos, and leader of the Seven against Thebes (see above). This Adrastus may be the same as the father of Eurydice, wife of Ilus (above).
