= Pyraechmes =

Legendary leader of the Paionians in the Trojan War

In Greek mythology, Pyraechmes (/pəˈrɛkmiːz/; Ancient Greek: Πυραίχμης, romanized: Pyraíkhmēs, lit. 'fiery spear' or 'one whose spear is like fire') was, along with Asteropaeus, a leader of the Paeonians in the Trojan War.

== Mythology ==
Pyraechmes came from the city of Amydon. Although Homer mentions Pyraechmes as the leader of the Paeonians early on in the Iliad, in the Trojan Catalogue, Pyraechmes plays a minor role compared to the more illustrious Asteropaeus, a later arrival to the front. Unlike Asteropaeus, Homer does not provide a pedigree for Pyraechmes (although Dictys Cretensis says his father was Axius - also the name of a river in Paeonia). Pyraechmes was killed in battle by Patroclus: dressed in Achilles' armor, Patroclus routed the panicked Trojans, and the first person he killed was Pyraechmes.
