= Chromis (mythology) =

Mythological character

In Greek mythology, the name Chromis (Ancient Greek: Χρόμις) may refer to:

- Chromis, one of the centaurs who attended Pirithous's and Hippodameia's wedding and fought in the battle against the Lapiths. He was eventually killed by the groom.
- Chromis, a man at the court of Phineus, was involved in the battle between Perseus and Phineus. He decipitated the very old Emathion with his sword, as he clung to the altar with trembling hands.
- Chromis (Chromius), a Mysian ally of Priam in the Trojan War, son of Arsinoos and brother of Ennomus.
- Chromis, a son of Heracles.
- Chromis, a companion of Aeneas killed by Camilla.
- Chromis, name shared by four defenders of Thebes in the war of the Seven against Thebes:
  - Chromis, son of a Phoenician woman named Dryope and a descendant of Cadmus. His mother became a Maenad when she was pregnant with him, and gave birth to him while dragging a sacred bull by the horns. He was one of the fifty warriors that laid an ambush against Tydeus but were killed by him.
  - Chromis, killed by Amphiaraus.
  - Chromis, killed by Tydeus.
  - Chromis, who slew Ion and was himself killed by Antiphōs.
