= Merops (mythology) =

Name of multiple Greek mythological figures

The name Merops (/ˈmɛ.rɒps/ or /ˈmɛ.rops/, MEH-rops; Ancient Greek: Μέροψ, romanized: Mérops, lit. 'mankind', 'mortals' or 'dividing the voice') refers to several figures from Greek mythology:

- Merops, king of Aethiopia, husband of Clymene and adoptive father of Phaethon, his wife's son by Helios.
- Merops, a resident of Miletus and father of Pandareus.
- Merops, king of Percote, father of two sons (Amphius and Adrastus) killed by Diomedes in the Trojan War, and of two daughters, Cleite, wife of Cyzicus, and Arisbe, the first wife of Priam. He had prophetic abilities and foresaw the deaths of his sons, but they ignored his warnings. Merops also taught Aesacus to interpret dreams.
- Merops, a son of Triopas, or an autochthon and a king of Cos (the island was thought to have been named after his daughter). He was married to the nymph Ethemea (or, more correctly, Echemeia), who was shot by Artemis for having ceased to worship the goddess and snatched away alive by Persephone. As Merops was about to commit suicide over his wife Echemeia's death, Hera took pity on the grieving widower and changed his shape into that of an eagle, and later placed him among the stars (the constellation Aquila). Merops was the father of Eumelus and through him grandfather of Agron, Byssa and Meropis, all of whom were notorious for their impiety. Clytie, the wife of Eurypylus of Cos, were given as the daughters of Merops.
- Merops, the father of Titanis, who was changed by Artemis into a deer because of her beauty.
- Merops, king of Anthemousia, who fought against Sithon of Thrace for the hand of the latter's daughter Pallene and was killed.
- Merops, whose daughter Epione was the wife of Asclepius.
- Merops, son of Hyas, who was the first to make people reassemble in settlements after the great deluge.
- Merops, a great-grandson of Temenus in the following genealogy of the Heraclidae: Heracles - Hyllus - Cleodaeus - Aristomachus - Temenus - Cissius - Thestius - Merops - Aristodamis - Pheidon - Caranus.
