= Nikola Vulić =

Serbian ancient historian (1872–1945)

Nikola Vulić (Serbian Cyrillic: Никола Вулић); (Shkodër, Ottoman Empire, 27 November 1872 – Belgrade, Yugoslavia, 25 May 1945) was a Serbian historian, classical philologist, prominent archaeologist, doctor of philosophy and professor at the University of Belgrade.

== Biography ==
Born in Shkodër (modern Albania) in 1872 during the period of Ottoman rule, he left for Serbia where he studied Latin, Old Church Slavonic, Ancient Greek, and ancient history. He graduated from the University of Belgrade in history. For his post-graduate studies, he went to the Ludwig-Maximilians-Universität München, where he received his doctorate. Upon his return to Belgrade, he was named professor at his alma mater. During World War I, Serbia's Minister of Education in-exile in Greece concluded that professors and teachers should be seconded from the army. Vulić was exempt from further serving in the army in 1917. In Clermont-Ferrand, he taught Latin to both Serb and French students.

He is remembered as the translator of Aeneid by Virgil from 1907 to 1908.

Academic offices
| Preceded by Živojin Đorđević | Dean of the Faculty of Philosophy; 1920–1923 | Succeeded by Vladimir K. Petković |
