= Odius (mythology) =

In Greek mythology, Odius (Ancient Greek: Ὀδίος or Ὀδίον) may refer to the following personages:

- Odius, leader during the Trojan War of the Alizonians from Alybe (Chalybes or Alope) together with his brother Epistrophus. They were children of Mecisteus. Agamemnon thrust Odius from his chariot and killed him with a spear which was fixed in his back between the shoulders. The lance was driven through his breast by the Mycenaean king causing Odius to fell with a thud and his armour clanged.
- Odius, a herald who attended those who tried to persuade Achilles to start fighting again.
