= Parium =

Ancient city in Turkey

Coordinates: 40.4162°N 27.0703°E

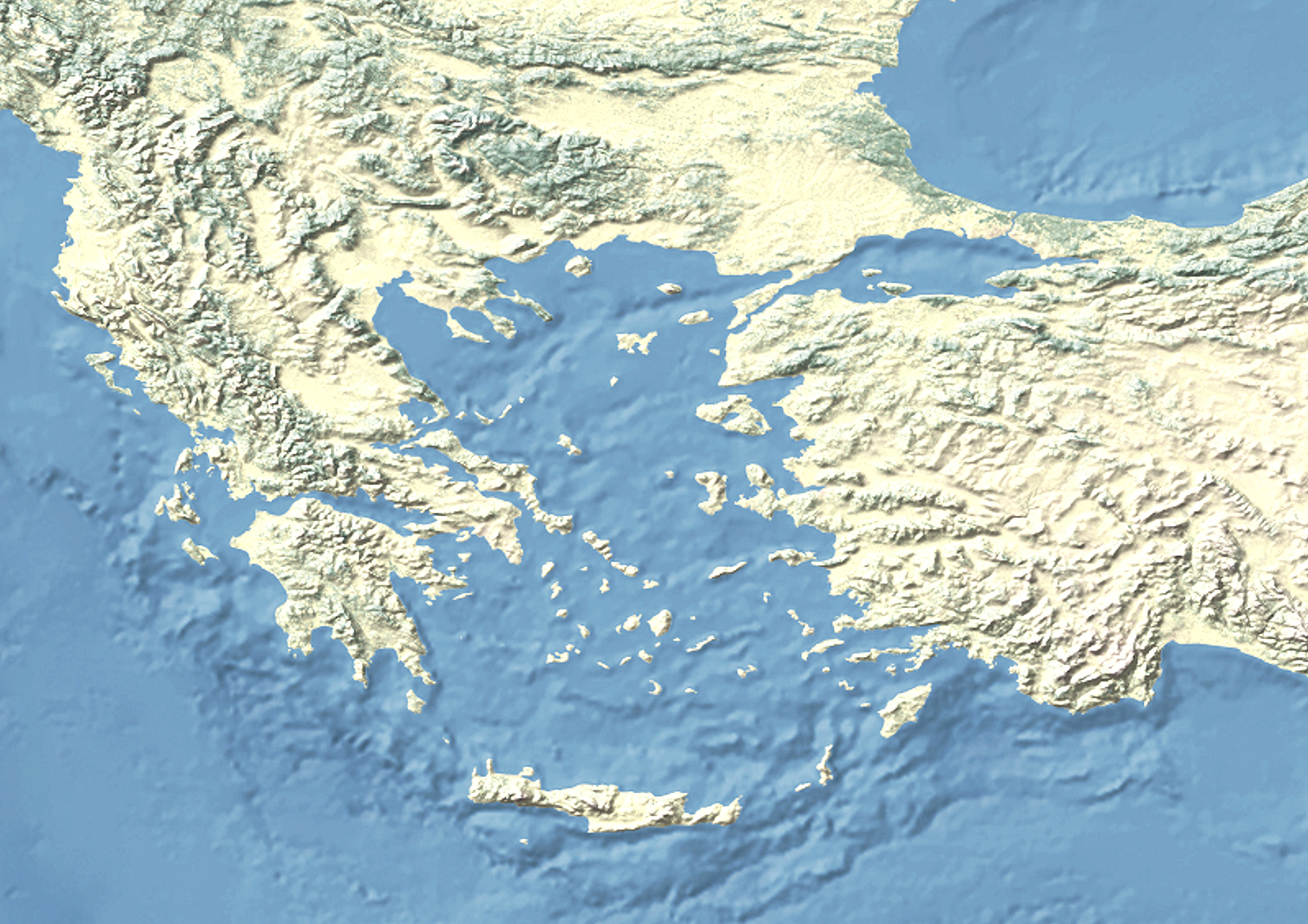
Location of Parium.

Parium (or Parion; Greek: Πάριον) was a Greek city of Adrasteia in Mysia on the Hellespont. Its bishopric was a suffragan of Cyzicus, the metropolitan see of the Roman province of Hellespontus.

== History ==
Founded in 709 B.C., the ancient city of Parion is located in the village of Kemer in the township of Biga in Çanakkale province of Turkey, currently. A major coastal city with two harbors in the Roman period, Parium had intensive relations with Thrace and Anatolia throughout history. This was the main customs station through which all Istanbul-bound goods from Greece and the Aegean had to pass.

According to Strabo, it was a colony of Milesians, Erythraeans, and Parians. Some ancient authors state that it was founded by Parion, son of Jason. Alternatively, it was named for the Trojan prince Paris after his father Priam had sent him there to be raised.

It belonged at one point to the Achaemenid Empire. Herophantus was a tyrant of Parion under Darius I.

It then belonged to the Delian League. In the Hellenistic period it came under the domain of Lysimachus, and subsequently the Attalid dynasty. In Roman times, it was a colonia, within the province of Asia; after that province was divided in the 4th century, it was in the province of Hellespontus. The ancient coinage of Parium is quite abundant, attesting to its great output and advanced mint (in Hellenistic times, the city's badge shown on coins was the Gorgoneion).

== Christian history ==
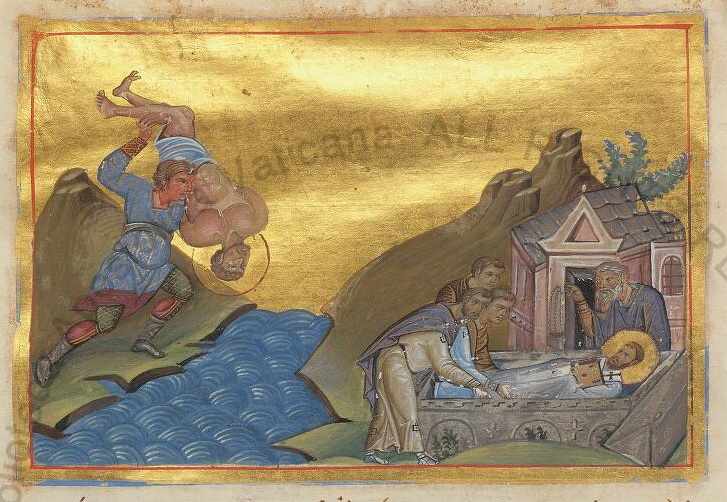
Death of Theogenes, bishop of Parium

The Acts of the martyr Onesiphorus prove that there was a Christian community in the region before 180. Other saints worthy of mention are: Saint Menignus, martyred under Emperor Decius and venerated on 22 November; Saint Theogenes, bishop and martyr, whose feast is observed on 3 January; Basil the Confessor, bishop and martyr in the 8th century, venerated on 12 April.

Le Quien (Oriens christianus I, 787–90) mentions 14 bishops, the last of whom lived in the middle of the 14th century. An anonymous Latin bishop is mentioned in 1209 by Pope Innocent III (Le Quien, op. cit., III, 945), and a titular bishop in 1410 by Eubel (Hierarchia Catholica medii ævi, I, 410).

At first a suffragan of the archbishopric of Cyzicus, Parium became an autocephalous archdiocese as early as 640 (Heinrich Gelzer, Ungedruckte ... Texte, 535). In the early 14th century, Emperor Andronikos II Palaiologos made Parium a metropolis, by uniting it with Pegae, as they both faced decline amid the Turkoman invasions. In 1354 the metropolis of Pegae-Parium was described as being close to disappearing. The incumbent metropolitan received the see of Sozopolis in Thrace (Miklosich and Müller, "Acta patriarchatus Constantinopolitani", I, 109, 111, 132, 300, 330), in hopes that it would support the other two economically. However, the metropolis soon disappeared.

The see is included in the Catholic Church's list of titular sees.

The ruins of Parium were under Ottoman rule at the Greek village of Kamares (the vaults), on the small cape Tersana-Bournou in the caza and sandjak of Bigha.

== Archaeology ==
Archaeologists have been carrying out excavations at the ancient site since 2005. Sarcophagi and graves, as well as ancient artifacts were found in the area. In 2017, ancient toys from the Hellenistic Period have been discovered inside tombs belonging to children, believed to be buried with the aim to accompany the children on their journey to the afterlife. Also, a baby bottle was discovered around the same necropolis.

In Parion there was a monumental altar which, according to the ancient writer Strabo, had sides the length of a stadion. The building was sometimes classified as one of the seven Wonders of the World, but there is no archaeological evidence of it.

In July 2026, an international team led by Ondokuz Mayıs University began the excavation season at the ancient city of Parion. Excavations focused on the Agora, where an outer portico wall and associated remains dating to the Archaic, Classical and Hellenistic periods were investigated, and the South Necropolis, where archaeologists continued work on a monumental square-plan tomb structure. The project also included conservation and documentation of finds, as well as further research into the ancient harbor and a presumed Ottoman period shipyard based on underwater surveys conducted in previous seasons.

== Notable people ==
- Herophantos (Ancient Greek: Ἡρόφαντος) of Parion, tyrant of Parion.
- Peregrinus Proteus, a cynic philosopher during the second century AD.

== See also ==
- List of ancient Greek cities

== Bibliography ==
- P. Frisch (ed.), Die Inschriften von Parion (Bonn, 1983) (Inschriften griechischer Städte aus Kleinasien 25).
