= Asteropaios =

Legendary leader of the Paionians in the Trojan War

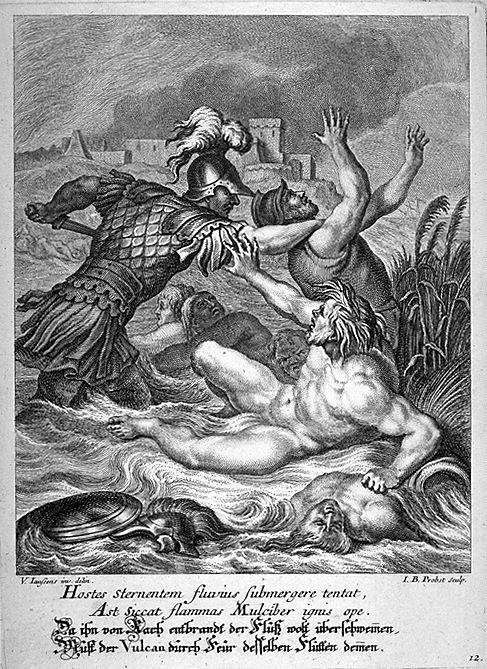
Achilles fights by the river, 18th-century engraving-etching Johann Balthasar Probst (1673–1748)

In the Iliad, Asteropaios or Asteropaeus (/ˌæstərəˈpiːəs/; Ancient Greek: Ἀστεροπαῖος, romanized: Asteropaîos, lit. 'star-child') was a leader of the Trojan-allied Paeonians along with fellow warrior Pyraechmes.

== Family ==
Asteropaios was the son of Pelagon, who was the son of the river god Axios and the mortal woman Periboia, daughter of Akessamenos.

== Mythology ==
Asteropaios was a newcomer to the war at the start of the Iliad; he had only been in Troy for less than two weeks.

Asteropaios had the distinction in combat of being ambidextrous and would on occasion throw two spears at once. In Book XII of the Iliad, as the Trojans attacked the Achaean wall, Asteropaios was a leader of the same division as the Lycian warriors Sarpedon and Glaucus, the division which pressed hard enough to allow Hector and his division to breach the wall.

In Book XXI, as Achilles is mercilessly slaughtering Trojan warriors alongside the river god Scamander and polluting the waters with dead bodies (including one of Priam's sons, Lycaon). While the river god pondering how he might stop Achilles, Achilles in turn attacks Asteropaios (himself the grandson of a river god) whom Scamander instills with courage to make a stand against Achilles.

Achilles and Asteropaios thus engage in one-on-one combat, Asteropaios throwing two spears at the same time at Achilles. One spear hit Achilles' shield, while the other reached his right forearm and drew blood. Asteropaios was the only Trojan in the Iliad who was able to draw blood from Achilles. However, he fails to kill Achilles, and is slain. And Achilles boasts that though Asteropaios may be descended from a river-god, that he, Achilles, is descended from a mightier god, Zeus. Later, in the funeral games for the slain Patroclus, the bronze and tin corslet and the silver-studded sword of Asteropaios are awarded as prizes.

The asteroid 4805 Asteropaios is named after the hero.
