= Amphimachus of Caria =

Son of Nomion in Greek mythology

In Greek mythology, Amphimachus (/æmˈfɪməkəs/; Ancient Greek: Ἀμφίμαχος derived from ἀμφί amphi "on both sides, in all directions, surrounding" and μάχη mache "battle") was the son of Nomion.

== Mythology ==
Amphimachus and his brother Nastes were captains of the Carian contingent on the side of the Trojans in the Trojan War. Either he or his brother were killed by Achilles; according to the commentary to the Iliad by Thomas D. Seymour, his brother Nastes was the one killed and of whom the armour and golden ornaments were subsequently stripped off.

And Nastes again led the Carians, uncouth of speech, who held Miletus and the mountain of Phthires, dense with its leafage, and the streams of Maeander, and the steep crests of Mycale. These were led by captains twain, Amphimachus and Nastes—Nastes and Amphimachus, the glorious children of Nomion. And he came to the war all decked with gold, like a girl, fool that he was; but his gold in no wise availed to ward off woeful destruction; nay, he was slain in the river beneath the hands of the son of Aeacus, swift of foot; and Achilles, wise of heart, bare off the gold.
