= Amydon =

Amydon (Ancient Greek: Ἀμυδών; gen: Ἀμυδῶνος) was a town of Paeonia, which is mentioned by Homer as the capital of the Paeonians fighting under Pyraechmes on the Trojan side in the Trojan War. The exact location seems to have been unknown in historical times, but it was probably located in the lower Axios region of Amphaxitis, which later became part of Lower Macedonia in the 5th century BC. Amydon was later called Abydon, but according to Strabo, it was destroyed.
