= Antiphus =

Set of mythological Greek characters

In Greek mythology, Antiphus or Ántiphos (/ˈæntəfəs/; Ancient Greek: Ἄντιφος) is a name attributed to multiple individuals:

- Antiphus, a Phthian prince as the son of King Myrmidon and Peisidice, and brother of Actor. He may be the same with Antippus, the father of Hippea who became the mother of Polyphemus, Caeneus and Ischys by Elatus, king of the Lapiths.
- Antiphus, the Thespian son of Heracles and Laothoe, daughter of King Thespius of Thespiae. Antiphus and his 49 half-brothers were born of Thespius' daughters who were impregnated by Heracles in one night, for a week or in the course of 50 days while hunting for the Cithaeronian lion. Later on, the hero sent a message to Thespius to keep seven of these sons and send three of them in Thebes while the remaining forty, joined by Iolaus, were dispatched to the island of Sardinia to found a colony.
- Antiphus, a defender of Thebes in the war of the Seven against Thebes who was killed by Amphiaraus and Apollo.
- Antiphus, son of Thessalus, the son of Heracles, and Chalciope. With his brother Pheidippus, Antiphus lead the forces of Calydnae, Cos, Carpathus, Casus and Nisyrus on the side of the Greeks against Troy. He was also believed to have invaded a region of Greece that he named Thessaly after his father.
- Antiphus, a Trojan prince as one of the 50 sons of King Priam and son of Hecuba. During the Trojan War, he killed Leucus, and later was killed by Agamemnon. In another account, Antiphus and his brothers, Agavus, Agathon, and Glaucus, were all slain by Ajax, son of Telamon.
- Antiphus of Maeonia, son of Talaemenes and brother of Mesthles; both he and his brother were allies of Priam in the Trojan War.
- Antiphus, son of Aegyptius and brother of Eurynomus. He was a Greek commander who sailed from Troy with Odysseus. Having previously escaped death at the hand of Eurypylus (son of Telephus), Antiphos was devoured by Polyphemus.
- Antiphus, an old friend of the house of Odysseus.

The name Antiphus is not to be confused with Antiphōs (Ἀντίφως), which refers to a soldier in the army of the Seven against Thebes who killed Chromis but was himself killed by Hypseus.
