= Amphius =

In Greek mythology, the name Amphius (Ancient Greek: Ἄμφιος, romanized: Ámphios) refers to two defenders of Troy:

- Amphius, son of Merops of Percote. Disregarding their father's advice, he and his brother Adrastus joined in the Trojan War and were killed by Diomedes.
- Amphius, son of Selagus, from Paesus. He was killed by Ajax the Great.

== Eponym ==
- 37519 Amphios, Jovian asteroid
