= Halizones =

Ancient tribe mentioned in Homer

The Halizones (Greek Ἁλιζῶνες, also Halizonians, Alizones or Alazones) are an obscure people who appear in Homer's Iliad as allies of Troy during the Trojan War. Their leaders were Odius and Epistrophus, said in the Bibliotheca to be sons of a man named Mecisteus. According to Homer, the Halizones came from "Alybe far away, where is the birth-place of silver,..." Strabo (in his Geography) speculates that "Alybe far away" may originally have read as "Chalybe far away", and he suggests that the Halizones may have been Chalybes, as well as Chaldians. Strabo's speculation equating the Halizones with the Chalybes still has proponents, such as the Russian historian Igor Diakonoff.

There has been much other speculation as to the origin of the name 'Halizones', with connections to both the 'Amazons' and the River Halys being suggested.

A scholiast on Homer derived the name from hals, sea, explaining that they lived in a land surrounded by the sea. However, he stated elsewhere that Odius was chief of the Paphlagonians. Herodotus (4.17, 52) placed the Halizones among the Scythians in the region of modern Vinnytsia Ukraine, while Ephorus, equating them with Amazons, located them near Cyme in Asia Minor. A later scholiast to Homer calls them a Thracian tribe. Meanwhile, Pliny the Elder, Hecataeus of Miletus, Menecrates of Elaea, and Palaephatus all placed the Halizones or Alazones in Mysia.
