= Ennomus =

Trojan heroes in the Iliad

In Greek mythology, Ennomus (/ˈɛnəməs/; Ancient Greek: Ἔννομος Ennomos) was the name of two defenders of Troy during the Trojan War:

- Ennomus, son of Arsinous. He was a Mysian ally of the Trojans, and was killed by Achilles. He was also said to have been a seer of birds.
- Ennomus or Eunomus, a Trojan warrior slain by Odysseus.

== See also ==
- Asteroid 4709 Ennomos
- Ennomos, a genus of moths
