= Percote =

Ancient Greek city

Coordinates: 40°16′26″N 26°35′20″E

Percote or Perkote (Ancient Greek: Περκώτη) was a town or city of ancient Mysia on the southern (Asian) side of the Hellespont, to the northeast of Troy. Percote is mentioned a few times in Greek mythology, where it plays a very minor role each time. It was said to be the home of a notable seer named Merops, also its ruler. Merops was the father of Arisbe (the first wife of King Priam, and subsequently wife of King Hyrtacus), Cleite (wife of King Cyzicus), and two sons named Amphius and Adrastus who fought during the Trojan War. As an ally of Troy, Percote sent a contingent to help King Priam during the Trojan War - though this contingent was led not by Merops's sons, but by Asius, son of Hyrtacus, according to Homer's Iliad, one native from Percote was wounded in the Trojan War by Antilochus, two natives from Percote were killed in the Trojan War by Diomedes and Ulysses. The Meropidae (Amphius and Adrastus) instead lead a contingent from nearby Adrastea. A nephew of Priam, named Melanippus, son of Hicetaon, herded cattle (oxen) at Percote, according to Homer.

It is mentioned by numerous ancient writers, including Herodotus, Arrian, Pliny the Elder, Apollonius of Rhodes, Stephanus of Byzantium, and in the Periplus of Pseudo-Scylax. According to Phanias of Eresus, Artaxerxes I of Persia had given to Themistocles the city of Percote with bedding for his house. (see: Percale)

It was a member of the Delian League.

Percote was no longer in existence during the time of Strabo, and in his Geography he mentions that the exact location of Percote on the Hellespont shore is unknown. Strabo also claims that Percote was originally called Percope, and that it was part of the Troad. The inhabitants of Percote (and neighboring places like Arisbe and Adrastea) were apparently neither Trojan or Dardanian, and the origins of the Meropidae and Hyrtacidae are unclear.

According to Stephanus of Byzantium, Perkote was also called Palaiperkote (Παλαιπερκώτη; "Old Perkote"). Modern research, however, has not reached a consensus on whether Palaiperkote was an alternative name for Perkote or an entirely separate settlement located nearby.

Its site is located 4 miles (6.4 km) east of Umurbey, Asiatic Turkey.

== See also ==
- List of ancient Greek cities
