= Adrasteia (Mysia) =

Historical region of Anatolia

Coordinates: 40°23′01″N 27°11′29″E

Adrasteia or Adrastea (Ancient Greek: Ἀδράστεια, Homeric Ἀδρήστεια) was the name of a region, city, and valley of the ancient Troad or of Mysia, which was watered by the Granicus River. In the eponymous city was an oracle of Apollo and Artemis. The temple had been destroyed by the time of Strabo, and the stones used to build a large altar. Parium was a port of the region.

Callisthenes said that it was named after the ancient king Adrastus, who had founded the first temple there.

Adrasteia was one of the cities of the era of the Trojan War; it probably belonged to the realm of Troy. Its lords were the two sons of Merope of Percote.

Its site is located above the plain of the same name in Çanakkale Province, Turkey.
