= Philotas (disambiguation) =

Philotas was the son of Parmenion executed by Alexander the Great.

Philotas may also refer to:

- Philotas (father of Parmenion), and grandfather of the famous Philotas
- Philotas (musician), a dithyrambic poet and musician 5th century BC
- Philotas (phrourarch), of Cadmea and Tyre general of Alexander the Great
- Philotas (satrap), a general of Alexander and Perdiccas
- Philotas (son of Carsis), royal page of Alexander
- Philotas (Antigonid general), late 4th century BC
- Philotas (Antiochid general), 2nd century BC
- Philotas (physician), from Amphissa 1st century BC
- Philotas of Thebes, Boeotian mythological figure
- Philotas (play), a 1731 tragedy by English dramatist Philip Frowde
- The Tragedy of Philotas, a 1605 play by English dramatist and poet Samuel Daniel
