= Alegenor =

Ancient Greek mythological figure

- Member of the Deucalionides or of the Athenian Royal House
- Abode: Boeotia

Genealogy
- Parents: Itonus
- Siblings: Hippalcimus, Electryon and Archilycus
- Offspring: Promachus, Clonius

In Greek mythology, Alegenor (Ancient Greek: Ἀλεγήνωρ, lit. 'one who cares for men' or 'he who is concerned with men') was the son of Itonus, son of Boeotus. He was the brother to Hippalcimus, Electryon and Archilycus. Alegenor had two sons, Clonius and Promachus.

== Family ==
=== Diodorus' account ===
"And Itonus, the son of Boeotus, begat four sons, Hippalcimus, Electryon, Archilycus, and Alegenor. Of these sons Hippalcimus begat Peneleos, Electryon begat Leïtus, Alegenor begat Clonius, and Archilycus begat Prothoënor and Arcesilaüs, who were the leaders of all the Boeotians in the expedition against Troy."

=== Homer's account ===
".... for the wife also of Promakhos son of Alegenor will never be gladdened by the coming of her dear husband..."
