= Itonus =

In Greek mythology, Itonus (/aɪˈtoʊnəs/; Ancient Greek: Ἴτωνος, romanized: Itonos), also Itonius, may refer to two individuals:

- Itonus, king of Iton in Phthiotis and son of Amphictyon. He was married to Melanippe, a nymph, and had a son Boeotus and two daughters, Chromia and Iodame. He founded a sanctuary of Athena, where his daughter Iodame served as priestess. Itonis and Itonia, surnames of Athena, were believed to have been derived from his name. In some versions of Athena's parentage, king Itonus is the father of the goddess. According to Graves, the myth of Itonus represents a claim by the Itonians that they worshipped Athene even before the Athenians did and his name shows that she had a willow cult in Phthiotis — like that of her counterpart, the goddess Anatha, at Jerusalem until Jehovah's priests ousted her and claimed the rain—making willow as his tree at the Feast of Tabernacles.
- Itonus, also the name of the son of another Boeotus (the son of Poseidon). He was the father of Electryon, Hippalcimus, Archilycus (Areilycus) and Alegenor; his grandsons were the Trojan War heroes Leitus, Peneleos, Prothoenor, Arcesilaus and Clonius.
