= Amyntor (mythology) =

Set of mythological Greek characters

In Greek mythology, Amyntor (Ancient Greek: Ἀμύντωρ, romanized: Amýntor, lit. 'defender') may refer to the following figures:

- Amyntor, the son of Ormenus, king of Eleon or Ormenium, and the father of Phoenix, Crantor, and Astydamia, who bore Heracles a son named Ctesippus.
- Amyntor, one of the sons of Aegyptus, who was killed by his cousin-wife, Damone, one of the Danaïdes.
- Amyntor, son of Phrastor, was the father of Teutamides and grandfather of Nanas. In the latter's reign, the Pelasgians were driven out of Greece and colonized a land which was later called Tyrrhenia.
