= Pelasgians =

Classical Greek term for pre-Greeks

The name Pelasgians (Ancient Greek: Πελασγοί, romanized: Pelasgoí, singular: Πελασγός, Pelasgós) was used by Classical Greek writers to refer either to the predecessors of the Greeks, or to all the inhabitants of Greece before the emergence of the Greeks. In general, "Pelasgian" has come to mean more broadly all the indigenous inhabitants of the Aegean Sea region and their cultures, and British historian Peter Green comments on it as "a hold-all term for any ancient, primitive and presumably indigenous people in the Greek world".

In the Classic period, enclaves under that name survived in several locations of mainland Greece, Crete, and other regions of the Aegean. Populations identified as "Pelasgian" spoke a language or languages that at the time Greeks ambivalently identified as "barbarian", though some ancient writers nonetheless described the Pelasgians as Greeks. A tradition also survived that large parts of Greece had once been Pelasgian before being Hellenized. These parts fell largely, though far from exclusively, within the territory which by the 5th century BC was inhabited by those speakers of ancient Greek who were identified as Ionians and Aeolians.

== Etymology ==
Much like all other aspects of the "Pelasgians", their ethnonym (Pelasgoi) is of extremely uncertain provenance and etymology. Michael Sakellariou collects fifteen different etymologies proposed for it by philologists and linguists during the last two hundred years, though he admits that "most [...] are fanciful".

An ancient etymology based on mere similarity of sounds links pelasgos to pelargos 'stork', postulating that the Pelasgians were migrants like storks, possibly from Arcadia, where they nest. Aristophanes deals effectively with this etymology in his comedy The Birds. One of the laws of "the storks" in the satirical Cloud Cuckoo Land (Ancient Greek: Νεφελοκοκκυγία, romanized: Nephelokokkugía), playing upon the Athenian belief that they were originally Pelasgians, is that grown-up storks must support their parents by migrating elsewhere and conducting warfare.

Gilbert Murray summarized the derivation from pelas gē 'neighboring land', current at his time: "If Pelasgoi is connected with πέλας", 'near', the word would mean 'neighbor' and would denote the nearest strange people to the invading Greeks.

Julius Pokorny derived Pelasgoi from *pelag-skoi 'flatland-inhabitants'; specifically, "inhabitants of the Thessalian plain". He details a previous derivation, which appears in English at least as early as William Ewart Gladstone's Studies on Homer and the Homeric Age; if the Pelasgians were not Indo-Europeans, the name in this derivation must have been assigned by the Hellenes. Ernest Klein argued that the ancient Greek word for 'sea', pelagos, and the Doric word plagos 'side' (which is flat), shared the same root, *plāk-, and that *pelag-skoi therefore meant 'the sea men', where the sea is flat.

== Ancient literary evidence ==
Map of Pelasgians and Pelasgus.

Literary analysis has been ongoing since classical Greece, when the writers of those times read previous works on the subject. No definitive answers were ever forthcoming by this method; it rather served to better define the problems. The method perhaps reached a peak in the Victorian era when new methods of systematic comparison began to be applied in philology. Typical of the era is the study by William Ewart Gladstone, who was a trained classicist. Unless further ancient texts come to light, advances on the subject cannot be made. Therefore the most likely source of progress regarding the Pelasgians continues to be archaeology and related sciences.

=== The term "Pelasgians" in ancient sources ===
Ancient Greek authors used the term "Pelasgian" fluidly. Pelasgians could be presented as pre-Greek, non-Greek, semi-Greek, or Greek as a rhetorical device to advance a particular author's objective. Such objectives included uniting Greeks, distinguishing Greeks from foreign "barbarians", and establishing an imagined historical foundation for a shared cultural and political identity. There are no extant emic (self-identified) definitions of Pelasgian identity.

=== Poets ===
==== Homer ====
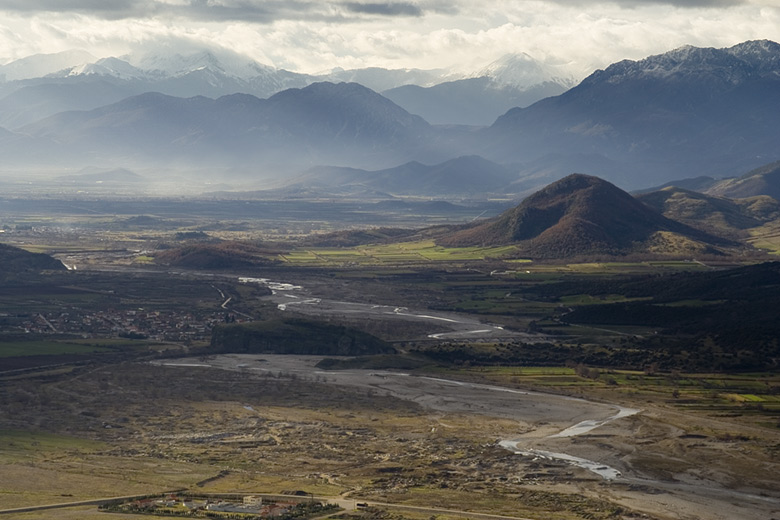
Plain of Thessaly, to the west of classical Pelasgiotis, but in the original range of the Pelasgians. The Pindus Mountains are visible in the background. The river is the Peneus.

In the Iliad, there were Pelasgians on both sides of the Trojan War. In the section known as the Catalogue of Trojans, they are mentioned between the Hellespontine cities and the Thracians of Southeastern Europe (i.e., on the Hellespontine border of Thrace). Homer calls their town or district "Larisa" and characterises it as fertile, and its inhabitants as celebrated for their spearsmanship. He records their chiefs as Hippothous and Pylaeus, sons of Lethus, son of Teutamides. The Iliad also refers to the camp at Greece, specifically at "Argos Pelasgikon", which is most likely to be the plain of Thessaly, and to "Pelasgic Zeus", living in and ruling over Dodona. Additionally, according to the Iliad, Pelasgians were camping out on the shore together with the following tribes:

Towards the sea lie the Carians and the Paeonians, with curved bows, and the Leleges and Caucones, and the goodly Pelasgi.

In the Odyssey, they appear among the inhabitants of Crete. Odysseus, affecting to be Cretan himself, instances Pelasgians among the tribes in the ninety cities of Crete, "language mixing with language side by side". Last on his list, Homer distinguishes them from other ethnicities on the island: "Cretans proper", Achaeans, Cydonians (of the city of Cydonia/modern Chania), Dorians, and "noble Pelasgians".

==== Hesiod ====
Hesiod, in a fragment known from Strabo, calls Dodona, identified by reference to "the oak", the "seat of Pelasgians", thus explaining why Homer, in referring to Zeus as he ruled over Dodona, did not style him "Dodonic" but Pelasgic Zeus. He mentions also that Pelasgus (Greek: Πελασγός, the eponymous ancestor of the Pelasgians) was the father of King Lycaon of Arcadia.

==== Asius of Samos ====
Asius of Samos (Ancient Greek: Ἄσιος ὁ Σάμιος) describes Pelasgus as the first man, born of the earth. This account features centrally in the construction of an enduring autochthonous Arcadian identity into the Classical period. In a fragment quoted by Pausanias, Asius describes the foundational hero of the Greek ethnic groups as "godlike Pelasgus [whom the] black earth gave up".

==== Aeschylus ====
Aeschylus incorporates all the territories that the Archaic tradition identifies as Pelasgian, including Thessaly (the region of Homer's Pelasgian Argos), Dodona (the seat of Homer's Pelasgian Zeus), and Arcadia (the region ruled by autochthonous Pelasgus's son Lycaon) into an Argive-Pelasgian kingdom ruled by Pelasgus. This affirms the ancient Greek origins of the Pelasgians as well as their widespread settlements throughout central Greece and the Peloponnese.

In Aeschylus's play, The Suppliants, the Danaids fleeing from Egypt seek asylum from King Pelasgus of Argos, which he says is on the Strymon, including Perrhaebia in the north, the Thessalian Dodona and the slopes of the Pindus mountains on the west and the shores of the sea on the east; that is, a territory including but somewhat larger than classical Pelasgiotis. The southern boundary is not mentioned; however, Apis is said to have come to Argos from Naupactus "across" (peras), implying that Argos includes all of east Greece from the north of Thessaly to the Peloponnesian Argos, where the Danaids are probably to be conceived as having landed. He claims to rule the Pelasgians and to be the "child of Palaichthon (or 'ancient earth') whom the earth brought forth".

The Danaids call the country the "Apian hills" and claim that it understands the karbana audan (accusative case, and in the Dorian dialect), which many translate as "barbarian speech" but Karba (where the Karbanoi live) is in fact a non-Greek word. They claim to descend from ancestors in ancient Argos even though they are of a "dark race" (melanthes ... genos). Pelasgus admits that the land was once called Apia but compares them to the women of Libya and Egypt and wants to know how they can be from Argos on which they cite descent from Io.

According to Strabo, Aeschylus's Suppliants defines the original homeland of the Pelasgians as the region around Mycenae.

==== Sophocles and Euripides ====
Sophocles and Euripides affirm the Greek origins of the Pelasgians while highlighting their relationship to the Danaids, a relationship introduced and explored in depth in Aeschylus's Suppliants.

Sophocles presents Inachus, in a fragment of a missing play entitled Inachus, as the elder in the lands of Argos, the Heran hills and among the Tyrsenoi Pelasgoi, an unusual hyphenated noun construction, "Tyrsenians-Pelasgians". Interpretation is open, even though translators typically make a decision, but Tyrsenians may well be the ethnonym Tyrrhenoi.

Euripides uses the term for the inhabitants of Argos in his Orestes and The Phoenician Women. In a lost play entitled Archelaus, he says that Danaus, on coming to reside in the city of Inachus (Argos), formulated a law whereby the Pelasgians were now to be called Danaans.

==== Ovid ====
The Roman poet Ovid describes the Greeks of the Trojan War as Pelasgians in his Metamorphoses:

Sadly his father, Priam, mourned for him, not knowing that young Aesacus had assumed wings on his shoulders, and was yet alive. Then also Hector with his brothers made complete but unavailing sacrifice, upon a tomb which bore his carved name. Paris was absent. But soon afterwards, he brought into that land a ravished wife, Helen, the cause of a disastrous war, together with a thousand ships, and all the great Pelasgian nation. [...] Here, when a sacrifice had been prepared to Jove, according to the custom of their land, and when the ancient altar glowed with fire, the Greeks observed an azure colored snake crawling up in a plane tree near the place where they had just begun their sacrifice. Among the highest branches was a nest, with twice four birds—and those the serpent seized together with the mother-bird as she was fluttering round her loss. And every bird the serpent buried in his greedy maw. All stood amazed: but Calchas, who perceived the truth, exclaimed, "Rejoice Pelasgian men, for we shall conquer; Troy will fall; although the toil of war must long continue—so the nine birds equal nine long years of war." And while he prophesied, the serpent, coiled about the tree, was transformed to a stone, curled crooked as a snake.

=== Historians ===
==== Hecataeus of Miletus ====
Hecataeus of Miletus in a fragment from Genealogiai states that the genos ("clan") descending from Deucalion ruled Thessaly and that it was called "Pelasgia" from king Pelasgus. A second fragment states that Pelasgus was the son of Zeus and Niobe and that his son Lycaon founded a dynasty of kings of Arcadia.

==== Acusilaus ====
A fragment from the writings of Acusilaus asserts that the Peloponnesians were called "Pelasgians" after Pelasgus, a son of Zeus and Niobe.

==== Hellanicus ====
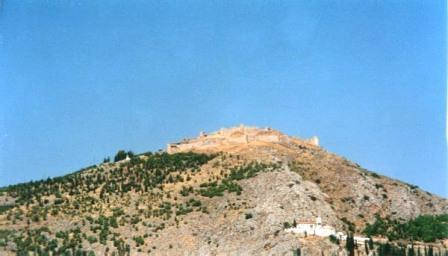
Larisa of Argos.

Hellanicus of Lesbos concerns himself with one word in one line of the Iliad, "pasture-land of horses", applied to Argos in the Peloponnesus. According to Hellanicus, from Pelasgus and his wife Menippe came a line of kings: Phrastōr, Amyntōr, Teutamides and Nanas (kings of Pelasgiotis in Thessaly). During Nanas's reign, the Pelasgians were driven out by the Greeks and departed for Italy. They landed at the mouth of the Po River, near the Etruscan city of Spina, then took the inland city "Crotona" (Κρότωνα), and from there colonized Tyrrhenia. The inference is that Hellanicus believed the Pelasgians of Thessaly (and indirectly of the Peloponnese) to have been the ancestors of the Etruscans.

==== Herodotus ====
In the Histories, the Greek historian Herodotus of Halicarnassus made many references to the Pelasgians. In Book 1, the Pelasgians are mentioned within the context of Croesus seeking to learn who the strongest Greeks were to befriend them. Afterwards, Herodotus ambivalently classified the Pelasgian language as "barbarian" though he thought of the Pelasgians to have been essentially Greek. Herodotus also discussed various areas inhabited (or previously inhabited) by Pelasgians/Pelasgian-speakers along with their different neighbors/co-residents:

I am unable to state with certainty what language the Pelasgians spoke, but we could consider the speech of the Pelasgians who still exist in settlements above Tyrrhenia in the city of Kreston, formerly neighbors to the Dorians who at that time lived in the land now called Thessaliotis; also the Pelasgians who once lived with the Athenians and then settled Plakia and Skylake in the Hellespont; and along with those who lived with all the other communities and were once Pelasgian but changed their names. If one can judge by this evidence, the Pelasgians spoke a barbarian language. And so, if the Pelasgian language was spoken in all these places, the people of Attica being originally Pelasgian, must have learned a new language when they became Hellenes. As a matter of fact, the people of Krestonia and Plakia no longer speak the same language, which shows that they continue to use the dialect they brought with them when they migrated to those lands.

Furthermore, Herodotus discussed the relationship between the Pelasgians and the (other) Greeks, which, according to Pericles Georges, reflected the "rivalry within Greece itself between [...] Dorian Sparta and Ionian Athens." Specifically, Herodotus stated that the Hellenes separated from the Pelasgians with the former group surpassing the latter group numerically:

As for the Hellenes, it seems obvious to me that ever since they came into existence they have always used the same language. They were weak at first, when they were separated from the Pelasgians, but they grew from a small group into a multitude, especially when many peoples, including other barbarians in great numbers, had joined them. Moreover, I do not think the Pelasgian, who remained barbarians, ever grew appreciably in number or power.

In Book 2, Herodotus alluded to the Pelasgians as inhabitants of Samothrace, an island located just north of Troy, before coming to Attica. Moreover, Herodotus wrote that the Pelasgians simply called their gods theoi prior to naming them on the grounds that the gods established all affairs in their order (thentes); the author also stated that the gods of the Pelasgians were the Cabeiri. Later, Herodotus stated that the entire territory of Greece (i.e., Hellas) was initially called "Pelasgia".

In Book 5, Herodotus mentioned the Pelasgians as inhabitants of the islands of Lemnos and Imbros.

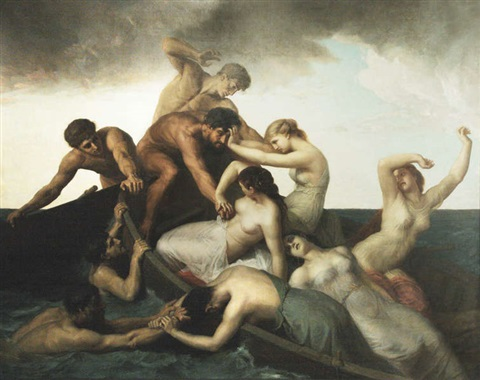
Athenian Women Surprised by the Pelasgians of Lemnos, Jean Benner, c. 1876

In Book 6, the Pelasgians of Lemnos were originally Hellespontine Pelasgians who had been living in Athens but whom the Athenians resettled on Lemnos and then found it necessary to reconquer the island. This expulsion of (non-Athenian) Pelasgians from Athens may reflect, according to the historian Robert Buck, "a dim memory of forwarding of refugees, closely akin to the Athenians in speech and custom, to the Ionian colonies". Also, Herodotus wrote that the Pelasgians on the island of Lemnos opposite to Troy once kidnapped the Hellenic women of Athens for wives, but the Athenian wives created a crisis by teaching their children "the language of Attica" instead of the Pelasgian.

In Book 7, Herodotus mentioned "the Pelasgian city of Antandrus" and wrote about the Ionian inhabitants of "the land now called Achaea" (i.e., northwestern Peloponnese) being "called, according to the Greek account, Aegialean Pelasgi, or Pelasgi of the Sea Shore"; afterwards, they were called Ionians. Moreover, Herodotus mentioned that the Aegean islanders "were a Pelasgian race, who in later times took the name Ionians" and that the Aeolians, according to the Hellenes, were known anciently as "Pelasgians."

In Book 8, Herodotus mentioned that the Pelasgians of Athens were previously called Cranai.

==== Thucydides ====
In the History of the Peloponnesian War, the Greek historian Thucydides wrote about the Pelasgians stating that:

Before the time of Hellen, son of Deucalion [...] the country went by the names of the different tribes, in particular of the Pelasgian. It was not till Hellen and his sons grew strong in Phthiotis, and were invited as allies into the other cities, that one by one they gradually acquired from the connection the name of Hellenes; though a long time elapsed before that name could fasten itself upon all.

The author regards the Athenians as having lived in scattered independent settlements in Attica; but at some time after Theseus, they changed residence to Athens, which was already populated. A plot of land below the Acropolis was called "Pelasgian" and was regarded as cursed, but the Athenians settled there anyway.

In connection with the campaign against Amphipolis, Thucydides mentions that several settlements on the promontory of Actē were home to:

[...] mixed barbarian races speaking the two languages. There is also a small Chalcidian element; but the greater number are Tyrrheno-Pelasgians once settled in Lemnos and Athens, and Bisaltians, Crestonians and Eonians; the towns all being small ones.

==== Ephorus ====
The historian Ephorus, building on a fragment from Hesiod that attests to a tradition of an aboriginal Pelasgian people in Arcadia, developed a theory of the Pelasgians as a people living a "military way of life" (stratiōtikon bion) "and that, in converting many peoples to the same mode of life, they imparted their name to all", meaning "all of Hellas". They colonized Crete and extended their rule over Epirus, Thessaly and by implication over wherever else the ancient authors said they were, beginning with Homer. The Peloponnese was called "Pelasgia".

==== Dionysius of Halicarnassus ====
In the Roman Antiquities, Dionysius of Halicarnassus in several pages gives a synoptic interpretation of the Pelasgians based on the sources available to him then, concluding that Pelasgians were Greek:

Afterwards some of the Pelasgians who inhabited Thessaly, as it is now called, being obliged to leave their country, settled among the Aborigines and jointly with them made war upon the Sicels. It is possible that the Aborigines received them partly in the hope of gaining their assistance, but I believe it was chiefly on account of their kinship; for the Pelasgians, too, were a Greek nation originally from the Peloponnesus [...]

He goes on to add that the nation wandered a great deal. They were originally natives of "Achaean Argos" descended from Pelasgus, the son of Zeus and Niobe. They migrated from there to Haemonia (later called Thessaly), where they "drove out the barbarian inhabitants" and divided the country into Phthiotis, Achaia, and Pelasgiotis, named after Achaeus, Phthius and Pelasgus, "the sons of Larissa and Poseidon." Subsequently, "about the sixth generation they were driven out by the Curetes and Leleges, who are now called Aetolians and Locrians".

From there, the Pelasgians dispersed to Crete, the Cyclades, Histaeotis, Boeotia, Phocis, Euboea, the coast along the Hellespont and the islands, especially Lesbos, which had been colonized by Macar son of Crinacus. Most went to Dodona and eventually being driven from there to Italy (then called Saturnia), they landed at Spina at the mouth of the Po River. Still others crossed the Apennine Mountains to Umbria and being driven from there went to the country of the Aborigines where they consented to a treaty and settled at Velia. They and the Aborigenes took over Umbria but were dispossessed by the Tyrrhenians. The author then continues to detail the tribulations of the Pelasgians and then goes on to the Tyrrhenians, whom he is careful to distinguish from the Pelasgians.<refname="Dionysius1.19"/>

=== Geographers ===
==== Pausanias ====
In his Description of Greece, Pausanias mentions the Arcadians who state that Pelasgus (along with his followers) was the first inhabitant of their land. Upon becoming king, Pelasgus invented huts, sheep-skin coats, and a diet consisting of acorns while governing the land named after him, "Pelasgia". When Arcas became king, Pelasgia was renamed "Arcadia" and its inhabitants (the Pelasgians) were renamed "Arcadians". Pausanias also mentions the Pelasgians as responsible for creating a wooden image of Orpheus in a sanctuary of Demeter at Therae, as well as expelling the Minyans and Lacedaemonians from Lemnos.

==== Strabo ====
Strabo dedicates a section of his Geography to the Pelasgians, relating both his own opinions and those of prior writers. He begins by stating:

Almost every one is agreed that the Pelasgi were an ancient race spread throughout the whole of Greece, but especially in the country of the Æolians near to Thessaly.

He defines Pelasgian Argos as being "between the outlets of the Peneus River and Thermopylae as far as the mountainous country of Pindus" and states that it took its name from Pelasgian rule. He includes also the tribes of Epirus as Pelasgians (based on the opinions of "many"). Lesbos is named Pelasgian. Caere was settled by Pelasgians from Thessaly, who called it by its former name, "Agylla". Pelasgians also settled around the mouth of the Tiber River in Italy at Pyrgi and a few other settlements under a king, Maleos.

== Language ==
In the absence of certain knowledge about the identity (or identities) of the Pelasgians, various theories have been proposed. Some of the more prevalent theories supported by scholarship are presented below. Since Greek is classified as an Indo-European language, the major question of concern is whether Pelasgian was an Indo-European language.

=== Reception ===
The theory that Pelasgian was an Indo-European language, which "fascinated scholars" and concentrated research during the second part of the 20th century, has since been critiqued; an emerging consensus among modern linguists is that the substrate language spoken in the southern Balkans was non-Indo-European. García-Ramón remarked that "the attempt to determine phonological rules for an Indo-European pre-Greek language ('Pelasgian') [...] is considered a complete failure today", while Beekes (2018) notes that "one of the demerits of Georgiev's Pelasgian theory was that it drew attention away from the Pre-Greek material itself", concluding that "the search for Pelasgian was an expensive and useless distraction." However, Biliana Mihaylova finds no contradiction between "the idea of [an] Indo-European Pre-Greek substratum" and "the possibility of the existence of an earlier non-Indo-European layer in Greece" given certain Pre-Greek words possessing Indo-European "pattern[s] of word formation."

=== Pelasgian as Indo-European ===
==== Greek ====
Edward Bulwer-Lytton argued that the Pelasgians spoke Greek based on the fact that areas traditionally inhabited by the "Pelasgi" (i.e. Arcadia and Attica) only spoke Greek and the few surviving Pelasgian words and inscriptions (i.e., Lamina Borgiana, Herodotus 2.52.1) betray Greek linguistic features despite the classical identification of Pelasgian as a barbarian language. According to Thomas Harrison of Saint Andrews University, the Greek etymology of Pelasgian terms mentioned in Herodotus such as θεοί (derived from θέντες) indicates that the "Pelasgians spoke a language at least 'akin to' Greek". According to French classical scholar Pierre Henri Larcher, if this linguistic affiliation is true, then it proves that the Pelasgians and the Greeks were the same people.

==== Anatolian ====
In western Anatolia, many toponyms with a "-ss-" suffix derive from the adjectival suffix also seen in cuneiform Luwian and some Palaic; the classic example is Bronze Age Tarhuntassa (loosely meaning "City of the Storm God Tarhunta"), and later Parnassus possibly related to the Luwian word parna- or "house". These elements have led to a second theory that Pelasgian was to some degree an Anatolian language, or that it had areal influences from Anatolian languages.

==== Thracian ====
Vladimir I. Georgiev, a Bulgarian linguist, asserted that the Pelasgians spoke an Indo-European language and were, more specifically, related to the Thracians.

==== Albanian ====
In 1854, an Austrian diplomat and Albanian language specialist, Johann Georg von Hahn, identified the Pelasgian language with Proto-Albanian. This theory is not supported by any scientific evidence, and is seen as a myth by modern scholars.

==== Undiscovered Indo-European ====
Albert Joris Van Windekens (1915–1989) offered rules for an unattested hypothetical Indo-European Pelasgian language, selecting vocabulary for which there was no Greek etymology among the names of places, heroes, animals, plants, garments, artifacts and social organization. His 1952 essay Le Pélasgique was skeptically received.

=== Pelasgian as pre-Indo-European ===
==== Unknown origin ====
One theory uses the name "Pelasgian" to describe the inhabitants of the lands around the Aegean Sea before the arrival of Proto-Greek speakers, as well as traditionally identified enclaves of descendants that still existed in classical Greece. The theory derives from the original concepts of the philologist Paul Kretschmer, whose views prevailed throughout the first half of the 20th century and are still given some credibility today.

Though Wilamowitz-Moellendorff wrote them off as mythical, the results of archaeological excavations at Çatalhöyük by James Mellaart and Fritz Schachermeyr led them to conclude that the Pelasgians had migrated from Asia Minor to the Aegean basin in the 4th millennium BC. In this theory, a number of possible non-Indo-European linguistic and cultural features are attributed to the Pelasgians:

- Groups of apparently non-Indo-European loan words in the Greek language, borrowed in its prehistoric development.
- Non-Greek and possibly non-Indo-European roots for many Greek toponyms in the region, containing the consonantal strings "-nth-" (e.g., Korinthos, Probalinthos, Zakynthos, Amarynthos), or its equivalent "-ns-" (e.g., Tiryns); "-tt-", e.g., in the peninsula of Attica, Mounts Hymettus and Brilettus/Brilessus, Lycabettus Hill, the deme of Gargettus, etc.; or its equivalent "-ss-": Larissa, Mount Parnassus, the river names Kephissos and Ilissos, the Cretan cities of Amnis(s)os and Tylissos etc. These strings also appear in other non-Greek, presumably substratally inherited nouns such as asáminthos (bathtub), ápsinthos (absinth), terébinthos (terebinth), etc. Other placenames with no apparent Indo-European etymology include Athēnai (Athens), Mykēnai (Mycene), Messēnē, Kyllēnē (Cyllene), Cyrene, Mytilene, etc. (note the common -ēnai/ēnē ending); also Thebes, Delphi, Lindos, Rhamnus, and others.
- Non-Greek inscriptions in the Mediterranean, such as the Lemnos stele.

The historian George Grote summarizes the theory as follows:

There are, indeed, various names affirmed to designate the ante-Hellenic inhabitants of many parts of Greece – the Pelasgi, the Leleges, the Curetes, the Kaukones, the Aones, the Temmikes, the Hyantes, the Telchines, the Boeotian Thracians, the Teleboae, the Ephyri, the Phlegyae, &c. These are names belonging to legendary, not to historical Greece – extracted out of a variety of conflicting legends by the logographers and subsequent historians, who strung together out of them a supposed history of the past, at a time when the conditions of historical evidence were very little understood. That these names designated real nations may be true but here our knowledge ends.

The poet and mythologist Robert Graves asserts that certain elements of that mythology originate with the native Pelasgian people (namely the parts related to his concept of the White Goddess, an archetypical Earth Goddess) drawing additional support for his conclusion from his interpretations of other ancient literature: Irish, Welsh, Greek, Biblical, Gnostic, and medieval writings.

==== Minoan ====
According to Russian scholar Yu. D. Andreyev, the Pelasgians may have been related to the Minoans. A number of scholars consider Minoan to be essentially the same language as Pelasgian.

==== Ibero-Caucasian ====
Some Georgian scholars (including R. V. Gordeziani, M. G. Abdushelishvili and Z. Gamsakhurdia) connect the Pelasgians with the Ibero-Caucasian peoples of the prehistoric Caucasus, known to the Greeks as Colchians and Iberians. According to Stephen F. Jones, these scholars portray Georgia as a source of spirituality in the Greek world by "manipulating Greek and Roman sources in a highly dubious manner".

== Archaeology ==
=== Attica ===
During the early 20th century, archaeological excavations conducted by the Italian Archaeological School and by the American Classical School on the Athenian Acropolis and on other sites within Attica revealed Neolithic dwellings, tools, pottery and skeletons from domesticated animals and fish. All of these discoveries showed significant resemblances to the Neolithic discoveries made on the Thessalian acropolises of Sesklo and Dimini. These discoveries help provide physical confirmation of the literary tradition that describes the Athenians as the descendants of the Pelasgians, who appear to descend continuously from the Neolithic inhabitants in Thessaly. Overall, the archaeological evidence indicates that the site of the Acropolis was inhabited by farmers as early as the 6th millennium BC. (Note: According to Prokopiou: "Some forty years ago excavations on the Athenian Acropolis and on other sites in Attica brought to light many indications of neolithic life – dwellings, vases, tools, skeletons of sheep – which confirmed the traditions recorded by Herodotus that the Athenians were descended from the Pelasgians, the neolithic inhabitants of Thessaly. Indeed the neolithic vases of Attica date from the earliest neolithic age (5520–4900) like the ceramics from the Thessalian acropolis of Sesclos, as well as from the later neolithic age (4900–3200) like those from the other Thessalian acropolis of Dimini...The search for traces of the neolithic age on the Acropolis began in 1922 with the excavations of the Italian Archaeological School near the Aesclepium. Another settlement was discovered in the vicinity of the Odeion of Pericles where many sherds of pottery and a stone axe, both of Sesklo type, were unearthed. Excavations carried out by the American Classical School near the Clepshydra uncovered twenty-one wells and countless pieces of handmade pottery, sherds of Dimini type, implements of later Stone Age and bones of domestic animals and fish. The discoveries reinforced the theory that permanent settlement by farmers with their flocks, their stone and bone tools and ceramic utensils had taken place on the rock of the Acropolis as early as the sixth millennium.")

=== Lemnos ===
In August and September 1926, members of the Italian School of Archaeology conducted trial excavations on the island of Lemnos. A short account of their excavations appeared in the Messager d'Athènes for 3 January 1927. The overall purpose of the excavations was to shed light on the island's "Etrusco-Pelasgian" civilization. The excavations were conducted on the site of the city of Hephaisteia (i.e., Palaiopolis) where the Pelasgians, according to Herodotus, surrendered to Miltiades of Athens. There, a necropolis (c. 9th–8th centuries BC) was discovered revealing bronze objects, pots, and more than 130 ossuaries. The ossuaries contained distinctly male and female funeral ornaments. Male ossuaries contained knives and axes whereas female ossuaries contained earrings, bronze pins, necklaces, gold diadems, and bracelets. The decorations on some of the gold objects contained spirals of Mycenean origin, but had no Geometric forms. According to their ornamentation, the pots discovered at the site were from the Geometric period. However, the pots also preserved spirals indicative of Mycenean art. The results of the excavations indicate that the Early Iron Age inhabitants of Lemnos could be a remnant of a Mycenaean population and, in addition, the earliest attested reference to Lemnos is the Mycenaean Greek ra-mi-ni-ja, "Lemnian woman", written in Linear B syllabic script. (Note: Professor Della Seta reports: "The lack of weapons of bronze, the abundance of weapons of iron, and the type of the pots and the pins gives the impression that the necropolis belongs to the ninth or eighth century BC. That it did not belong to a Greek population, but to a population which, in the eyes of the Hellenes, appeared barbarous, is shown by the weapons. The Greek weapon, dagger or spear, is lacking: the weapons of the barbarians, the axe and the knife, are common. Since, however, this population...preserves so many elements of Mycenaean art, the Tyrrhenians or Pelasgians of Lemnos may be recognized as a remnant of a Mycenaean population.")

=== Boeotia ===
During the 1980s, the Skourta Plain Project identified Middle Helladic and Late Helladic sites on mountain summits near the plains of Skourta in Boeotia. These fortified mountain settlements were, according to tradition, inhabited by Pelasgians up until the end of the Bronze Age. Moreover, the location of the sites is an indication that the Pelasgian inhabitants sought to distinguish themselves "ethnically" (a fluid term) and economically from the Mycenaean Greeks who controlled the Skourta Plain. (Note: French reports: "The fourth and final season of the survey of the Skourta plain was conducted in 1989 by M. and M.L.Z. Munn (ASCS). Explorations begun in 1985 and 1987 were extended into new parts of the plain and surrounding valleys, so that by now a representative portion (approximately 25%) of most of the inhabitable areas of the three koinotites of Pyli, Skourta, and Stefani have been examined intensively. 66 sites were discovered or studied for the first time in the course of this highly productive season, yielding a total of 120 premodern sites studied by our survey since 1985. The survey should have identified all major settlement sites (over 5 ha) and a representative sample of smaller sites in the study area. A summary of the chief conclusions to be drawn from the four seasons can be made...MH settlement is established on two summits overlooking the plain...one of which, Panakton...becomes the most substantial LH site in the area. A fortified MH settlement is also established on a peak in rugged country beyond the NE edge of the plain...between the Mazareika and Vountima valleys, in which other settlements are established in the LH era...The remoteness of this NE sector, and the great natural strength of the MH site and a nearby LH IIIC citadel...suggest that the inhabitants of these glens and crags sought to protect and separate themselves from peoples beyond the peaks that surrounded them, perhaps because they were ethnically distinct and economically more or less independent of the Myc Greeks who dominated the plains. Traditions of Pelasgians in these mountains at the end of the BA raise the possibility that these may have been Pelasgian sites. Once abandoned, in the LH IIIC or PG eras, most of these sites in the NE sector are not again inhabited for well over a millennium. Elsewhere, within the more accessible expanse of the Skourta plain itself, LH settlements are established on many sites which are later again important in the C era...")

== See also ==
- Barbarian
- Dacians
- Etruscan civilization
- Falisci
- Illyrians
- Leleges
- Minyans
- Names of the Greeks
- Old European culture
- Paleo-Balkan languages
- Pelasgian creation myth
- Pre-Greek substrate
- Rûm
- Sea peoples
- Thracians
- Tyrrhenians
