= Archilycus =

Ancient Greek mythological figure

- Member of the Deucalionides or of the Athenian Royal House
- Abode: Boeotia

Genealogy
- Parents: Itonus
- Siblings: Hippalcimus; Electryon; Alegenor
- Offspring: Archesilaus; Prothoenor

In Greek mythology, Archilycus (Ancient Greek: Ἀρχίλυκος, romanized: Archílykos, lit. 'chief wolf' or 'master of wolves') or Areilycus, was the father of Archesilaus and Prothoenor (by Theobula), who were the leaders of the Boeotians in the expedition against Troy. His father was Itonus, son of Boeotus while his brothers were Hippalcimus, Electryon, and Alegenor.

== Family ==
Archilycus is a minor character in the myth and his genealogy is discussed in the following excerpts:

- Diodorus Siculus, Library of History, Book 4.67.7:
  And Itonus, the son of Boeotus, begat four sons, Hippalcimus, Electryon, Archilycus, and Alegenor. Of these sons Hippalcimus begat Peneleos, Electryon begat Leïtus, Alegenor begat Clonius, and Archilycus begat Prothoënor and Arcesilaüs, who were the leaders of all the Boeotians in the expedition against Troy.
- Hyginus, Fabulae 97:
  Arcesilaus, son of Areilycus and Theobula, from Boeotia, with 10 ships
