= Haemon (mythology) =

In Greek mythology, Haemon or Haimon (/ˈhiːmɒn/; Ancient Greek: Αἵμων; gen.: Αἵμωνος, romanized: Haímōn, lit. 'bloody') may refer to the following personages and a creature:

- Haemon, also called Haemonius (Αἱμόνιος, Haimónios), father of the she-goat or nymph Amalthea who was famous for her magical horn.
- Haemon, an Arcadian prince as one of the 50 sons of the impious King Lycaon either by the naiad Cyllene, Nonacris or by unknown woman. He was credited to be the eponymous founder of the town of Haemoniae. Haemon and his siblings were the most nefarious and carefree of all people. To test them, Zeus visited them in the form of a peasant. These brothers mixed the entrails of a child into the god's meal, whereupon the enraged king of the gods threw the meal over the table. Haemon was killed, along with his brothers and their father, by a lightning bolt of the god.
- Haemon, the eponym of Haemonia (ancient Thessaly) and the son of Chlorus, son of Pelasgus. In some accounts, he was instead identified as the son of Pelasgus. Haemon was the father of Thessalus who gave his name to Thessaly after.
- Haemon, father of Aechme who became the wife of the Argive Polypheides and by him the mother of Theoclymenus and Harmonides.
- Haemon, son of Creon and Eurydice, fiancé of Antigone.
- Haemon, son of Thoas and father of Oxylus.
- Haemon, son of Alector, son of Magnes, and father of Hyperochus, grandfather of Tenthredon, father of Prothous.
- Haemon, father of Elasippus, one of the Achaean soldiers who fought at Troy. His son was killed by the Amazon queen, Penthesilea.
- Haemon, a Pylian soldier who fought under their leader Nestor during the Trojan War.
- Haemon, one of Actaeon's dogs.
