= Acteis =

In Greek mythology, Acteis or Akteϊs (Ancient Greek: Άκτηἶδοζ, romanized: Aktēis) was the mother by Alector of Clonius. The latter was one of the Boeotian leaders in the Trojan War. Otherwise, the parents of Clonius was/were (1) Alegenor; or (2) Lacritus and Cleobule.
