= Hippalmus =

In Greek mythology, Hippalmus or Hippalmos (Ancient Greek: Ἵππαλμόν or Ἵππαλμος) may refer to the following personages:

- Hippalmus, a chieftain of the Arachotes and Dersaioi, who armed themselves against Dionysus in the Indian War. He is father of Billaeus and Pyloites.
- Hippalmus, one of the Calydonian boar hunters who along with Pelagon was attacked by the boar. Their bodies was taken up by their comrades and they survived the attack.
- Hippalmus, alternative name of Hippalcimus, son of Itonus (himself son of Boeotus). He was the father by Asterope of Peneleos, one of the Boeotian leaders.
- Hippalmus, an Achaean warrior who participated in the Trojan War. He was slain by the Amazon queen, Penthesilia.
