= Theobule =

Set of mythological Greek characters

In Greek mythology, the name Theobule (Ancient Greek: Θεοβούλη, romanized: Theoboule, lit. 'divine will' or 'divine counsel') refers to:

- Theobule, mother of Myrtilus by Hermes.
- Theobula, mother of Arcesilaus and Prothoenor by Areilycus (Archilycus). Their son was one of the Boeotian leaders in the Trojan War. In one account, Alector was the father of Arcesilaus by Cleobule and Prothoenor by Arteis.

This name was also thought to have given rise to Sibyl by Varro, a Roman man of letters. The historian Jerome similarly explained Theobule as the Attic form of the Doric Σιοβόλλα (Siobolla), a variant of Sibulla (Sibyl in Greek)
