= Arteis =

In Greek mythology, Arteϊs (Ancient Greek: Άρτηίς, gen. Ἄρτηίδος) was the mother by Alector of Prothoenor. The latter was one of the Boeotian leaders in the Trojan War. Otherwise, the parents of Prothoenor were Theobule and Archilycus, son of Itonus.
