= Lacritus (mythology) =

Greek mythical figure

In Greek mythology, Lacritus (Ancient Greek: Λάκριτος, romanized: Lákritos, lit. 'chosen from the people' or 'separated from the people') was the Boeotian father of the Argonaut Leitus and Clonius by Cleobule. Otherwise, Leitus was called the son of Alector and Polybule or simply he was an earth-born, thus a son of Gaea. Meanwhile, in some accounts, Clonius' parents was/were (1) Alegenor, or of (2) Alector and Acteis instead.
