= Phthia (disambiguation) =

Phthia was a region in ancient Greece; the home of the mythical Myrmidons

It can also refer to:

- In Greek mythology: see Phthia (mythology)
  - Phthia, one of the Niobids
  - Phthia, mother of Dorus, Laodocus and Polypoetes by Apollo
  - Phthia or Clytia, concubine of Amyntor
  - Phthia, daughter of Phoroneus
- In ancient history:
  - Phthia of Epirus, the mother of Pyrrhus of Epirus
  - Phthia of Macedon, a granddaughter of Pyrrhus of Epirus
- Other:
  - 189 Phthia, an asteroid
  - Phthia (bug), a genus of leaf-footed bug
