= Ormenion =

Ormenion (Ὀρμένιον) may refer to:

- Ormenio, a village in Thrace, Greece
- Ormenium, a town of ancient Thessaly, Greece
