= Crantor (disambiguation) =

Crantor was an Ancient Greek philosopher.

Crantor may also refer to:

- Crantor (mythology), in Ovid's Metamorphoses, was an arms-bearer for Achilles' father Peleus, killed in the battle of the Lapiths and the Centaurs, at the wedding feast of Pirithous.
- 83982 Crantor, a centaur (minor planet) orbiting between the orbits of Saturn and Neptune
