= Iphiloche =

In Greek mythology, Iphiloche (Ancient Greek: Ἰφιλόχη, lit. 'strong ambush', 'mighty troop' or 'strong in childbirth'), also called Echemela (Ancient Greek: Ἐχέμελα or Ἐχμήλα, lit. 'she who possesses apple trees' or 'she who holds sheep'), was a Spartan princess as the daughter of Alektor, son of Pelopid Argeus and Hegesandre, daughter of King Amyclas of Sparta. Later on, she married Megapenthes, the bastard son of Menelaus by a slave woman.
