= Scamandrius =

Scamandrius or Skamandrios (Ancient Greek: Σκαμάνδριος) may refer to:

- Astyanax, son of Hector and Andromache
- Another name for Helenus, a son of Priam
- Scamandrius (Trojan War), a Trojan warrior.
- Skamandrios (moon), satellite of the asteroid 624 Hektor
- Scamandrius, eponymous archon 510–509 BC
