= Amyntor (son of Ormenus) =

Greek mythological figure

In Greek mythology, Amyntor (Ancient Greek: Ἀμύντωρ, romanized: Amýntor, lit. 'defender' or 'helper') was the son of Ormenus, and a king of Eleon or Ormenium. Amyntor's son Phoenix, on his mother's urgings, had sex with his father's concubine, Clytia or Phthia. Amyntor, discovering this, called upon the Erinyes to curse him with childlessness. In a later version of the story, Phoenix was falsely accused by Amyntor's mistress and was blinded by his father, but Chiron restored his sight.

Amyntor was also the father of a son Crantor, and a daughter Astydamia. When Amyntor lost a war with Achilles' father Peleus, king of Phthia, Amyntor gave Crantor to Peleus as a pledge of peace. Strabo reports a genealogy for Amyntor which made him the grandson of Cercaphus, the son of Aeolus, and the brother of Euaemon, the father of Eurypylus. In another account, Amyntor relates his royal line to be descended from Zeus himself: Hyperochus—Eurypylus—Ormenus—Pheres—Amyntor.

When Amyntor refused Heracles permission to pass through his kingdom, Heracles killed Amyntor and fathered a son Ctesippus, by Astydamia. During the Trojan War, Odysseus received a helmet that had originally belonged to Amyntor.

== Mythology ==
According to the Iliad, Amyntor, the son of Ormenus, was a king in Hellas, and the father of Phoenix, who became a tutor of Achilles, whom he accompanied to the Trojan War. In a speech, addressed to Achilles, Phoenix tells of the conflict between himself and his father. When Amyntor forsook his wife, Phoenix's mother, for a concubine, at the urging of his jealous mother, Phoenix had sex with Amyntor's concubine. To punish this crime Amyntor called upon the Erinyes to curse Phoenix with childlessness. Outraged Phoenix intended to kill Amyntor, but was finally dissuaded. Instead he fleeing through Hellas, Phoenix went to Peleus in Phthia, where he became king of the Dolopians. Also according to the Iliad, the thief Autolycus broke into Amyntor's house in Eleon and stole a helmet, which Meriones gave to Odysseus during the Trojan War.

The mythographer Apollodorus gives a different version of Phoenix's story, probably drawn from a lost play by the tragedian Euripides. In this account Phoenix was falsely accused of having sex with Amyntor's concubine Phthia, and was blinded by Amyntor. Peleus brought Phoenix to the centaur Chiron who restored his sight, after which Peleus made him king of the Dolopians. According to Apollodorus, Amyntor was a king of Ormenium, and one day when Heracles wished to pass through his land, Amyntor took up arms and opposed him, and was killed by Heracles, who then fathered a son Ctesippus, by Amyntor's daughter Astydamia.

Brief references to Amyntor are found in the poems of the third-century BC poets Callimachus and Lycophron. Callimachus, mentions the sons of Ormenus inviting Erysichthon to games associated with the cult of Athena at Itone in Thessaly, while Lycophron refers to Amyntor blinding Phoenix. According to Ovid, in his Metamorphoses, Amyntor had a son Crantor, whom he gave to Peleus when he sued for peace, and who died fighting alongside Peleus in the Centauromachy, the battle between the Lapiths and the Centaurs at the wedding feast of Pirithous.

Strabo reports that, according to the Greek grammarian Demetrius of Scepsis, Amyntor's father Ormenus was the eponymous founder of the city of Ormenium (which Strabo identifies with a village called Orminium which he located at the foot of Mount Pelion, near the Pegasitic Gulf). According to this account Ormenus was the son of Cercaphus, the son of Aeolus, and Ormenus had two sons Amyntor and Euaemon, and that Amyntor had a son Phoenix, and Eumaemon had a son Eurypylus who succeeded to the throne, because Phoenix had fled to Peleus in Phthia.

Scholia name Phoenix's mother either Cleobule or Hippodameia, and the concubine as either Clytia or Phthia.
