= Thessalus =

Greek mythological figures

In Greek mythology, the name Thessalus (/ˈθɛsələs/ Ancient Greek: Θεσσαλός, romanized: Thessalós, lit. 'Thessalian man') is attributed to the following individuals, all of whom were considered possible eponyms of Thessaly.

- Thessalus, son of Haemon, son of Chlorus, son of Pelasgus.
- Thessalus, son of Poseidon and one of the reputed father of Minyas, founder of Minyan Orchomenus.
- Thessalus, son of Jason and Medea, the twin of Alcimenes and older brother of Tisandrus. He escaped being murdered by his mother and, after the death of Acastus, became king of Iolcus.
- Thessalus, also called Thettalus, son of Heracles and Chalciope. He was the father of Antiphus, Pheidippus and Nesson. After the Carians settled at Calydna and Nisyros, Thessalus took possession of both islands later.
