= Alector =

Several characters in Greek mythology

Alector (/əˈlɛktər/; Ancient Greek: Ἀλέκτωρ, romanized: Alektor or Alektōr, lit. 'rooster' or 'cock') refers to more than one person in classical mythology and history:

- Alector, son of Magnes and Meliboea, eponyms of Magnesia and the town of Meliboea respectively. He was the father of Haemon, father of Hyperochus, grandfather of Tenthredon, father of Prothous who led the Magnesian contingent during the Trojan War.
- Alector, the Boeotian father of Leitus. Homer calls him "Alectryon", and Diodorus "Electryon", naming him among the sons of Itonus. According to Tzetzes, Alector was also the father of Clonius, Arcesilaus and Prothoenor (his nephews according to Diodorus) by different mothers: he is said to have fathered Leitus with Polybule, Arcesilaus with Cleobule, Prothoenor with Arteis, and Clonius with Acteis.
- Alector, an Elean prince as the son of King Epeius, and brother of Hyrmine. Later on, he succeeded his father on the throne of Elis but in fear of the overlordship of King Pelops of Pisa, he summoned Phorbas from Olenus to his aid and gave his new ally a share of the kingdom. By Phorbas’ daughter, Diogeneia, Alector became father of Amarynceus.
- Alector, the Argive son of Anaxagoras and father of King Iphis of Argos.
- Alector of Sparta, son of Argeus (son of Pelops) and Hegesandra, daughter of King Amyclas. He has two brothers, Melanion and Boethoos. Alector was the father of Iphiloche or Echemela, who married Megapenthes, son of Menelaus.
