= Megapenthes (son of Menelaus) =

Figure in Greek mythology

In Greek mythology, Megapenthes (Ancient Greek: Μεγαπένθης, romanized: Megapénthēs, lit. 'great sorrow' or 'great grief') was the illegitimate son of Menelaus, the king of Sparta, by a slave. He married Alector's daughter, Iphiloche or Echemela. His name means 'great sorrow'.

== Mythology ==
Megapenthes was mentioned as early as Homer's Odyssey, where Menelaus marries him to the Spartan Alector's daughter, and is described as:

stalwart Megapenthes, who was his [Menelaus's] son well-beloved, born of a slave woman;

The mythographer Apollodorus, says that the name of his slave mother was Pieris or Tereis:

Menelaus had ... by a female slave Pieris, an Aetolian, or, according to Acusilaus, by Tereis, he had a son Megapenthes;"

According to the geographer Pausanias, because Megapenthes and his brother Nicostratus were the sons of Menelaus by a slave, and thus illegitimate, Agamemnon's son Orestes succeeded Menelaus as king of Sparta. Pausanias also says that, according to the Rhodians, when Orestes was "still wandering" (being chased by the Erinyes because of his killing of his mother Clytemenestra), Nicostratus and Megapenthes drove out Helen, who found refuge on Rhodes with Polyxo, who then betrayed Helen and had her killed.

Pausanias reports seeing Megapenthes and Nicostratus depicted riding a single horse, on the sixth century BC Doric-Ionic temple complex at Amyclae known as the throne of Apollo, designed by Bathycles of Magnesia.
