= Polybule =

In Greek mythology, Polybule (Ancient Greek: Πολυβούλη,, romanized: Polyboulē, lit. 'abundant counsel', 'rich in advice' or 'of many counsels') was the Boeotian mother of the Argonaut Leitus by Alector. Alternatively, Leitus parents were identified to be Lacritus and Cleobule or an earth-born, thus a son of Gaea.
