= Cnossia =

Nymph in Greek mythology

Cnossia was a nymph or slave in Greek mythology. By Menelaus, king of Sparta, she mothered a son named Xenodamus.

Due to her name, she is associated with the city of Cnossus on Crete. Slaves were sometimes named for their backgrounds and Cnossia is elsewhere unattested as a proper name.
