= Tereis =

Slave of Menelaus in Greek mythology

In Greek mythology, Tereis (Ancient Greek: Τηρηίς, romanized: Tērēís, lit. 'guardian', 'watcher' or 'protector') was one of the names given for the slave who was the mother, by Menelaus, of Megapenthes. According to R. L. Fowler, the name Tereis occurs nowhere else, may be associated with Thrace, and is possibly corrupt.

== Sources ==
Homer's Odyssey, and the geographer Pausanias, mention that Megapenthes was the illegitimate son of Menelaus, king of Mycenaean Sparta, by a slave, without naming her. But according to one source, the sixth-century BC mythographer Acusilaus (as reported by the mythographer Apollodorus), the name of the slave was Tereis. Other sources give other names for the slave who bore Megapenthes. For example Apollodorus, in the same passage in which he mentions Tereis, also mentions "Pieris, an Aetolian".
