= Eurymache =

In Greek mythology, Eurymache (Ancient Greek: Εὐρυμάχη) was the mother by Tenthredon of Prothous, leader of the Magnesians during the Trojan War. Otherwise, Prothous's mother was called Kleoboule, daughter of Eurytos.
