= Cleobule =

Several figures in Greek mythology

In Greek mythology, the name Cleobule, also Cleoboule, Cleobula, Kleobule or Kleoboule, (Ancient Greek: Κλεοβούλη, romanized: Kleoboúlē, lit. 'glory of counsel' or 'fame in wisdom') refers to:

- Cleobule, daughter of Aeolus or Aeopolus, one of the possible mothers of Myrtilus by Hermes.
- Cleobule, wife of Aleus of Tegea, mother of Cepheus and Amphidamas.
- Cleobula, mother by Ares of Cycnus who was killed by Heracles.
- Cleobule, mother of Amphimachus by Cteatus instead of Theronice.
- Cleobule, mother of Leonteus by Coronus.
- Cleobule, daughter of Eurytus and by Tenthredon, possibly the mother of Prothous, leader of the Magnesians during the Trojan War. Otherwise, Eurymache was called the mother of the Prothous.
- Cleobule, mother of Phoenix by Amyntor. Otherwise, Hippodameia or Alcimede was called the mother). Cleobule had two other possible children by Amyntor, Asydameia and Crantor. Cleobule was jealous of Amyntor's love for his concubine, Clytie or Phthia, so she convinced her son Phoenix to sleep with her, but when Amyntor found out, he cursed Phoenix with sterility.
- Cleobule, the Boeotian mother of Leitus by Lacritus; alternately, mother of Arcesilaus by Alector (Alectryon). Otherwise, Leitus' mother was Polybule by Alector or he was an earth-born, thus a son of Gaea. Meanwhile, Arcesilaus' parents were Areilycus and Theobule.
- Cleobule, mother of the tragedian Euripides by Apollo, as stated by Hyginus. Whether this is an otherwise unknown legend or simply the result of corruption of the text is uncertain.

== See also ==
- Kleobule, mother of Demosthenes
