= Pylaeus =

Greek mythological character

In Greek mythology, Pylaeus (Ancient Greek: Πύλαιος), son of Lethus, son of Teutamides, descendant of Pelasgus. He was one of the allies to King Priam in the Trojan War; he commanded the Pelasgian contingent together with his brother Hippothous. Pylaeus is hardly ever mentioned separately from his brother; they are said to have fallen in battle together by Dictys Cretensis and to have been buried "in a garden" according to the late Latin poet Ausonius.

Strabo, in his comment on the Homeric passage referenced above, mentions that according to a local tradition of Lesbos, Pylaeus also commanded the Lesbian army and had a mountain on the island named Pylaeus after him.

Pylaeus is also an epithet of Hermes.
