= Ctesius =

One of several characters in Greek mythology

In Greek mythology, Ctesius (Ancient Greek: Κτήσιος means 'belonging to property, acquisition') may refer to:

- Ctesius, king of the island called Syra and son of Ormenus. He was the father of Eumaeus.
- Ctesius, one of the Suitors of Penelope who came from Dulichium along with other 56 wooers. He, with the other suitors, was slain by Odysseus with the aid of Eumaeus, Philoetius, and Telemachus.
- Ctesius or Ktesios, minor god of household.
- Ctesius, an epithet of Zeus. Zeus Ctesius was mainly honoured in the household, though there were some public altars to him. He was sometimes depicted in the form of a snake.
