= Eurythoe =

Danaïd in Greek mythology

In Greek mythology, Eurythoe (/jʊˈrɪθoʊˌiː/; Ancient Greek: Eὐρυθόη, romanized: Eurythoē) is one of the Danaïdes. She is one of the possible mothers of Oenomaus by Ares; she is alternatively the mother of Hippodamia by Oenomaus.
