= Phrastor =

In Greek mythology, the name Phrastor (Ancient Greek: Φράστωρ) may refer to:

- Phrastor, son of Pelasgus and Menippe, daughter of Peneus. He was the father of Amyntor, grandfather of Teutamides, and great-grandfather of Nanas.
- Phrastor, in a rare version of the myth, son of Oedipus and Jocasta and brother of Laonytus. The brothers fought against Erginus of Orchomenus and fell in the battle.
- Phrastor, victor of javelin throw during the first Olympic games established by Heracles.
