= Chlorus =

Greek mythological figure

In Greek mythology, Chlorus (Ancient Greek: Χλώρου) was the son of Pelasgus and father of Haemon, father of Thessalus. In some accounts, however, Haemon was called the son of Pelasgus instead. Haemon and Thessalus were both eponyms of Haemonia and Thessaly.
