= Hyperochus =

Greek mythological figures with similar names

In Greek mythology, the name Hyperochus (Ancient Greek: Ὑπέροχος, romanized: Hupérokhos, lit. 'distinguished above all others') may refer to:

- Hyperochus, a descendant of Zeus. He was the father of Eurypylus, the father of Ormenus.
- Hyperochus, possibly the father of Oenomaus by Sterope.
- Hyperochus, a descendant of Magnes, son of Haemon, grandfather of Tenthredon and thus grandfather of Prothous.
- Hyperochus, a Hyperborean whose ghost, alongside those of Pyrrhus (Neoptolemus) and a fellow Hyperborean Amadocus (or Laodocus), and possibly that of Phylacus, were believed to have terrorized the Gaul invaders during the historical battle at Delphi.
- Hyperochus, a son of Priam

Hypeirochus (Ὑπείροχος) is a variant of the same name which refers to:

- Hypeirochus, a defender of Troy killed by Odysseus; may or may not be the same as the son of Priam.
- Hypeirochus, father of Itymoneus; the latter was killed by Nestor in the war between the Pylians and the Eleans.
