= Aeopolus =

In Greek mythology, Aeopolus (Ancient Greek: Αἰπόλος, gen.: Αἰοπόλου, romanized: Aipolus or Aiopólos, lit. 'goatherd') was the father of Cleobule, one of the possible mother of Myrtilus by Hermes. He was also called Aeolus.
