= Pieris (mythology) =

Slave of Menelaus in Greek mythology

In Greek mythology, Pieris (Ancient Greek: Πιερίς, romanized: Pierís, lit. 'from Pieria') was one of the names given for the slave who was the mother, by Menelaus, of Megapenthes. Homer's Odyssey, and the geographer Pausanias, mention that Megapenthes was the illegitimate son of Menelaus, king of Mycenaean Sparta, by a slave, without naming her. But according to the mythographer Apollodorus:

Menelaus had ... by a female slave Pieris, an Aetolian, or, according to Acusilaus, by Tereis, he had a son Megapenthes"

Other sources give other names for the slave who bore Megapenthes.
