= Phthia (mistress of Amyntor) =

Mistress of Amyntor in Greek mythology

In Greek mythology, Phthia (Ancient Greek: Φθία, romanized: Phthía, lit. 'withering') or Clytia (Ancient Greek: Κλυτία, romanized: Klutía, lit. 'renowned') is the concubine of Amyntor, king of Ormenium. She became the reason for the falling out between Amyntor and his son Phoenix after Phoenix slept with her. In a different version, she lied to Amyntor about Phoenix raping her. Phoenix was exiled as a result, and variously blinded or cursed with infertility.

Although not named, the earliest mention of her appears in the eighth-century BC epic Iliad by Homer. Other scholiasts and authors also mention her in passing.

== Etymology ==
C. J. Mackie associated the noun Phthia (also the name of Achilles' homeland) with the verbs φθίνω/φθινύθω, meaning 'to wither,' or 'waste away,' a connection prominent after the death of Patroclus and Achilles' own potential glorious death or fade in obscurity. It would be thus related to the word φθίσις (phthísis), meaning decline, consumption (i.e. tuberculosis).

The proper name Clytia is derived from the ancient Greek adjective κλυτός (klutós), which translates to "glorious" or "renowned". That word itself comes from the verb κλύω, meaning 'to hear, to understand', ultimately from the Proto-Indo-European root *ḱlew-, which means 'to hear'.

== Mythology ==
In Homer, this woman (who goes unnamed) became concubine to king Amyntor, ruler of Ormenium, who cherised her greatly to the jealousy of his legally wedded wife Queen Cleobule. The deeply resentful Cleobule pestered her son by Amyntor, Phoenix, multiple times to lie himself with the concubine so that the girl, after being with a young man, would turn against her aged lover. Phoenix finally yielded to her pressure and did as told. But Amyntor found out, and cursed his son to the Furies, goddesses of revenge, with childlessness. A Homeric scholiast gives her name as Clytia.

According to pseudo-Apollodorus however writing some eight or nine hundred years later, Amyntor's mistress Phthia falsely accused Phoenix of sexually assaulting her, leading to Amyntor blinding and driving away his son. Even though the queen meant to take revenge for the wrong done against her, in no version is Amyntor said to have taken some action against the mistress herself.

== Analysis ==
=== Development of the myth ===
The second version of this tale was dramatised by Euripides in his now lost tragedy Phoenix. A scholiast on the Iliad credits the rhetoric Aristodemus of Nysa with the defence of Phoenix and an alternate reading of the Iliad's passage, as well as Sosiphanes, Euripides and one Harpocration with presenting him as a guiltless party. Euripides is the earliest known author to have treated the myth after Homer (as the contents of Sophocles' lost Phoenix are unknown), and might had been the innovator of the false rape accusation and Phoenix's blinding, which became very dominant elements of the narrative afterwards. The play is a typical example of Euripides' early period starring "evil women" and their wrongdoings, particularly of the "Potiphar's wife" motif. As evidenced from the Cyzicene epigrams (a collection of nineteen poems of the Palatine Anthology that describe the myth-themed reliefs displayed on the columns of Temple of Apollonis, a second-century BC temple at Cyzicus) the variation with Phthia's lie was used in a 2nd-century Cyzicene temple.

=== Symbolism ===
The word used by Homer to describe the concubine in relation to her liaision with Amyntor is παλλακίς (pallakís), an alternative spelling of παλλακή (pallakḗ), meaning 'concubine' or 'young girl'. In ancient Greek culture, a pallake or pallakis was a man's unmarried consort, one of lower status than a legally married wife, but she stood higher than a mere prostitute or a hetaira.

The late version recounted by Apollodorus is one of several examples of a popular archetype used in Greek mythology and worldwide, known as 'Potiphar's wife', in which a woman, typically an already married one, attempts to seduce a man but fails and then goes on to accuse him of sexual assault or rape to a male relative of hers. Usually this is done out of fear of the woman’s inappropriate behaviour being exposed to said male relative.

The most notable Greek example of that is Hippolytus and his stepmother Phaedra, the son and wife of the Athenian hero Theseus respectively; other examples include Stheneboea with Bellerophon, Cleoboea with Antheus, and Ochne with Eunostus. The parallels between such stories and the Biblical tale of Joseph, Potiphar and Potiphar's wife can be seen very clearly. According to the Suda lexicon, Hieronymus of Rhodes recorded a tale about how the Attic hero-god Anagyros caused an old man's mistress to fall in love with his younger son, and compared it to the Euripides' version of Amyntor's mistress and son.

== See also ==
Other such examples:

- Astydamia
- Philonome
- Astymedusa

== Bibliography ==
- Apollodorus, The Library, with an English translation by Sir James George Frazer, F.B.A., F.R.S. in 2 Volumes. Cambridge, MA, Harvard University Press; London, William Heinemann Ltd. 1921. Online version at the Perseus Digital Library.
- Babiniotis, Georgios (2009). Ετυμολογικό Λεξικό της Νέας Ελληνικής Γλώσσας [Etymological Dictionary of Modern Greek Language] (in Greek) (2nd ed.). Athens, Greece: Lexicology Centre.
- Beekes, R. S. P. (2009). Lucien van Beek (ed.). Etymological Dictionary of Greek. Leiden Indo-European Etymological Dictionary Series. Vol. 1. Leiden, the Netherlands: Brill Publications. ISBN 978-90-04-17420-7.
- Beekes, Robert S. P. (2010). Lucien van Beek (ed.). Etymological Dictionary of Greek. Leiden Indo-European Etymological Dictionary Series. Vol. ΙΙ. Leiden, the Netherlands: Brill Publications. ISBN 978-90-04-17419-1.
- Bell, Robert E. (1991). Women of Classical Mythology: A Biographical Dictionary. ABC-Clio. ISBN 9780874365818.
- Collard, Christopher; Cropp, Martin, eds. (2009). Euripides Fragments: Oedipus-Chrysippus, Other Fragments. Loeb Classical Library 506. Cambridge, MA: Harvard University Press. ISBN 978-0-674-99631-1.
- Cyzicene epigrams in The Greek Anthology, volume 1 (of five), translated into English by William Roger Paton (1857-1921), Loeb/Heinemann edition of 1916, text cleaned up and reformatted by Brady Kiesling. Available online at Topos Text.
- Gantz, Timothy (1993). Early Greek Myth: A Guide to Literary and Artistic Sources. Vol. I. Johns Hopkins University Press. ISBN 978-0-8018-5360-9.
- Grimal, Pierre (1987). The Dictionary of Classical Mythology. Wiley-Blackwell. ISBN 0-631-13209-0.
- Hard, Robin (2004). The Routledge Handbook of Greek Mythology: Based on H. J. Rose's "Handbook of Greek Mythology". Routledge. ISBN 9780415186360.
- Homer, The Iliad with an English translation by A.T. Murray, PhD in two volumes. Cambridge, MA., Harvard University Press; London, William Heinemann, Ltd. 1924. Online version at the Perseus Digital Library.
- Liddell, Henry George; Scott, Robert (1940). A Greek-English Lexicon, revised and augmented throughout by Sir Henry Stuart Jones with the assistance of Roderick McKenzie. Oxford: Clarendon Press. Online version at Perseus.tufts project.
- Mackie, C. J. (June 2002). "Homeric Phthia". Colby Quarterly. 38 (2).
- Rose, Herbert J. (2004). A Handbook of Greek Mythology (6th ed.). London, New York: Routledge. ISBN 0-415-04601-7.
- Trenkner, Sophie (1958). The Greek Novella in the Classical Period. Cambridge, UK: Cambridge University Press. ISBN 978-1-107-43825-5.
- Tzetzes, John, Lycophronis Alexandra. Vol. II: Scholia Continens, edited by Eduard Scheer, Berlin, Weidmann, 1881. Internet Archive.
- White, Jeffrey A. (1982). "Bellerophon in the 'Land of Nod': Some Notes on Iliad 6.153-211". The American Journal of Philology. 103 (2).
