= Philotas (descendant of Peneleos) =

Philotas of Thebes (Greek: Φιλώτας) a descendant of Argonaut Peneleos, followed the expedition of Athenians under the sons of King Codrus, and is said to be the founder of Priene in Ionia.
