= Prothoenor =

Character in Greek mythology

In Greek mythology, Prothoenor (Ancient Greek: Προθοήνωρ, lit. 'the one who runs first before anyone else' or 'first to rush forward') was one of the Greek leaders in the Trojan War, from Thespiae in Boeotia, son of Areilycus (Archilycus) and Theobule, brother of Arcesilaus; he commanded eight ships. In one account, Prothoenor was the son of Alector and Arteis, and thus a half-brother of Leitus and Clonius. According to the Iliad, he was killed by Polydamas, who immediately began to boast about it.
