= Scamandrius (Trojan War) =

Trojan warrior in the Iliad

In Greek mythology, Scamandrius (Ancient Greek: Σκαμάνδριος, Skamándrios) is a Trojan warrior who fought in the Trojan War and was slain by Menelaus in battle. He appears in the Iliad, the 8th-century BC epic poem written by Homer.

== Family ==
The Trojan Scamandrius was the son of a man named Strophius by an unnamed mother.

== Mythology ==
Before the war, Scamandrius was trained in archery by the hunting goddess Artemis herself, and with her guidance he excelled in the use of bow and arrow. Scamandrius fought in the Trojan War on the Trojan side, and was slain in battle during the ninth year of the war by Menelaus, the husband of Helen, who struck him with his spear in the back as Scamandrius ran away. He fell on his face and died.

== See also ==
- Rhesus of Thrace
- Orion
- Meriones
- Scamander

== Bibliography ==
- Homer, The Iliad with an English Translation by A.T. Murray, PhD in two volumes. Cambridge, MA., Harvard University Press; London, William Heinemann, Ltd. 1924. Online version at the Perseus Digital Library.
- Smith, William, Dictionary of Greek and Roman Biography and Mythology, London. John Murray: printed by Spottiswoode and Co., New-Street Square and Parliament Street, 1873. Online version at the Perseus Digital Library.
