= Menippe (mythology) =

Greek divine

Menippe (/mɪˈnɪpiː/; Ancient Greek: Μενίππη, romanized: Meníppē or Menippê, lit. 'the courageous mare' or 'sipper') in Greek mythology may refer to the following women:

- Menippe, one of the 3,000 Oceanides, water-nymph daughters of the Titans Oceanus and his sister-spouse Tethys.
- Menippe, the "divine" Nereid, one of the 50 marine-nymph daughters of the 'Old Man of the Sea' Nereus and the Oceanid Doris.
- Menippe, daughter of Orion, see Menippe and Metioche
- Menippe, a Thessalian naiad daughter of the river-god Peneus. By Pelasgus, she became the mother of Phrastor, who emigrated to Italy and there became the king of the Tyrrhenians.
- Menippe, daughter of Thamyris and mother of Orpheus by Oeagrus.
- Menippe, one of the Amazons. She fought in Aeetes' army against the troops of Perses.
