= Hippalcimus =

In Greek mythology, the name Hippalcimus (Ancient Greek: Ἱππάλκιμον) may refer to:

- Hippalcimus, son of Itonus (himself son of Boeotus), and father, by Asterope, of Peneleos. Other variations of his name were Hippalcmas, Hippalkmos (Ίππάλκμου) and Hippalmus.
- Hippalcimus or Hippalcus, son of Pelops and Hippodamia. He was one of the Argonauts.
