= Crantor (mythology) =

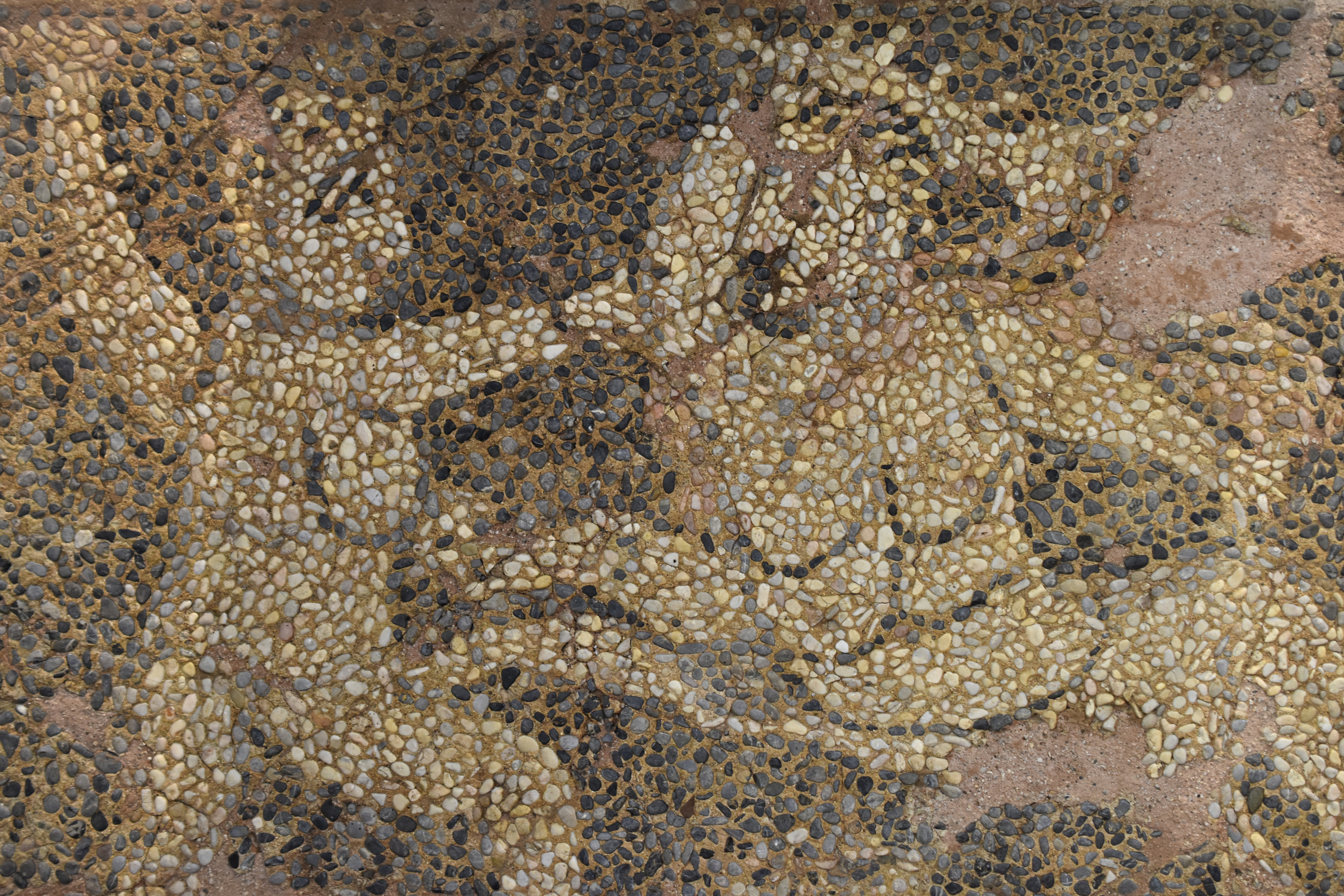
A mosaic floor depicting the Centauromachy, with a naked man (possibly a Lapith) on the left and a Centaur holding a tree on the right, from the andron (symposium room) of a house in Eretria, Euboea, late 3rd-early 2nd century BCE, Archaeological Museum of Chalkis

In Greek mythology, Crantor (Ancient Greek: Κράντωρ, -ορος) was a son of Amyntor and possibly Hippodamia or Cleobule. He was probably the brother of Astydameia and Phoenix.

== Mythology ==
When Amyntor lost a war with Achilles' father Peleus, Amyntor gave his son Crantor to Peleus as a pledge of peace. Crantor became the arms-bearer for Peleus, and was killed by the centaur Demoleon in the Centauromachy, the battle between the Lapiths and the Centaurs at the wedding feast of Pirithous. Demoleon fatally wounded Crantor after he tore off Crantor's chest and left shoulder with a tree trunk that Demoleon had thrown at Theseus, who ducked out of the way. When Peleus saw this he cried out: "O Crantor! most beloved! / Dearest of young men!', and then succeeded in killing Demoleon.
