= Philotas (musician) =

Philotas (Greek: Φιλώτας; lived 5th century BC) was an ancient Greek dithyrambic poet and musician, the disciple of Philoxenus of Cythera. He is considered only worthy of notice as having once gained a victory over his great contemporary Timotheus of Miletus.
