= Philotas (phrourarch) =

Macedonian officer

Philotas (Greek: Φιλώτας) was a Macedonian officer, appointed phrourarch on the Cadmea, at the time of the revolt of the Thebans against Alexander the Great, 335 BC. Though closely blockaded in the citadel, and vigorously besieged by the citizens, he was able to hold out until the arrival of Alexander, and the capture of the city, when he contributed greatly to the discomfiture of the Thebans, by a vigorous sally from the citadel.

Philotas was also the name of the phrourarch of Tyre after the Siege of Tyre (332 BC)
