= Philotas (son of Carsis) =

Philotas (Greek: Φιλώτας), son of Carsis, was a Thracian, who may have married the daughter of a Macedonian aristocrat named Philotas. He was one of the pages basilikoi paides in the service of Alexander the Great, who were induced by Hermolaus and Sostratus to join in the conspiracy against the king's life. He was stoned to death together with the other accomplices.
