= Philotas (Antiochid general) =

Philotas (Greek: Φιλώτας) was a general in the service of Antiochus III the Great, who commanded the garrison of Abydos in the Roman–Syrian War. He was besieged by the Roman fleet under Gaius Livius Salinator (190 BC) and was desirous to capitulate, but before the terms could be agreed upon, the news of the defeat of the Rhodian fleet under Pamphilidas caused Livius to withdraw in all haste in order to oppose the Antiochid admiral Polyxenidas of Rhodes.
