= Ormenium =

Ormenium (Ancient Greek: Ὀρμένιον) was a town of ancient Thessaly, mentioned in the Catalogue of Ships in Homer's Iliad, along with Hypereia and Asterium, as belonging to Eurypylus. In Greek mythology, it was said to have been founded by Ormenus, the grandson of Aeolus, and was the birthplace of Phoenix (a grandson of Ormenus). Strabo identifies this town with a place in Magnesia named Orminium, situated at the foot of Mt. Pelion near the Pagasaean Gulf, at the distance of 27 stadia from Demetrias, on the road passing through Iolcus, which was 7 stadia from Demetrias and 20 from Orminium.

William Martin Leake, however, observes that the Ormenium of Homer can hardly have been the same as the Orminium of Strabo, since it appears from the situation of Asterium that Eurypylus ruled over the plains of Thessaliotis, which are watered by the Apidanus and Enipeus. The questioning of Strabo's equation of Ormenium with Orminium is still the norm among current scholars; some believing that, instead, Ormenium should be close to Pharsalus, in a Mycenaean site in modern Ktouri. Some archaeologists have related it to the remains found on the Goritsa hill. Others point to a site otherwise called Armenium at Petra. While others leave the site as unlocated.
