= Haemoniae =

Ancient Arcadian town

Coordinates: 37°23′26″N 22°09′57″E

Haemoniae or Haimoniai (Ancient Greek: Αἱμονιαί) was a town in ancient Arcadia, in the district Maenalia.

Its site is near the modern Perivolia/Rousvanaga.
