= Leitus =

Mythical son of Alector

In Greek mythology, Leitus (/ˈliːɪtəs/; Ancient Greek: Λήϊτος, romanized: Leïtos, lit. 'of the people' or 'public') was a leader of the Boeotians and admiral of 12 ships which sailed against Troy.

== Family ==
Leitus was the son of Alector (Alectryon) and Polybule or of Lacritus and Cleobule. He was the brother of Clonius, and probably the half-sibling of other Boeotian leaders, Arcesilaus and Prothoenor.

In some accounts, Leitus was described as an earth-born and thus a son of Gaia (Earth).

== Mythology ==
Leitus also sailed with the Argonauts and afterwards, as one of the suitors of Helen, fought in the Trojan War, where he killed 20 enemies, including Phylacus.

Leitus was one of the seven Achaean leaders (others being Teucer, Thoas, Meriones, Antilochus, Peneleos and Deipyrus) in front of whom Poseidon appeared during the Trojans' attack on the Achaean ships, urging them to fight back instead of acting like cowards. He was wounded by Hector on the hand at the wrist, but in the end, he was the only Boeotian leader to safely return home after the Trojan War. He also brought back the remains of Arcesilaus, another Boeotian chieftain, and buried them near the city of Lebadea. His own tomb was at Plataeae.
