= Tenthredon =

Greek mythological figure

In Greek mythology, Tenthredon (Ancient Greek: Τενθρηδών) was a grandson of Hyperochus, a descendant of Maagnes. He was the father of Prothous, leader of the Magnesians during the Trojan War. Tenthredon's wife who bore his son was either Eurymache or Cleobule, daughter of Eurytus.
