= Ormenus =

Set of mythological Greek characters

In Greek mythology Ormenus (Ancient Greek: Ὄρμενος, romanized: Ormenos, lit. 'impetuous', 'eager' or 'one who sets in motion') is the name of eight men.

- Ormenus, one of the Telchines.
- Ormenus, king of Ormenion in Thessaly and son of Cercaphus. He was the father of Amyntor and Euaemon. In an alternative account, Ormenus was the son of Euryplus and father of Pheres, the father of Amyntor instead.
- Ormenus, one of the warriors in the army of the Seven against Thebes. He fell in the fighting.
- Ormenus, a Trojan warrior killed by Polypoetes during the Trojan War.
- Ormenus, a Trojan soldier who was shot dead by the Greek hero, Teucer, during the Trojan War.
- Ormenus, father of Ctesius, king of the isle of Syra. Ctesius is the father of Eumaeus.
- Ormenus, one of the Suitors of Penelope who came from Dulichium along with other 56 wooers. He, with the other suitors, was shot dead by Odysseus with the help of Eumaeus, Philoetius, and Telemachus.
