= Phoenix (son of Amyntor) =

Greek mythical figure

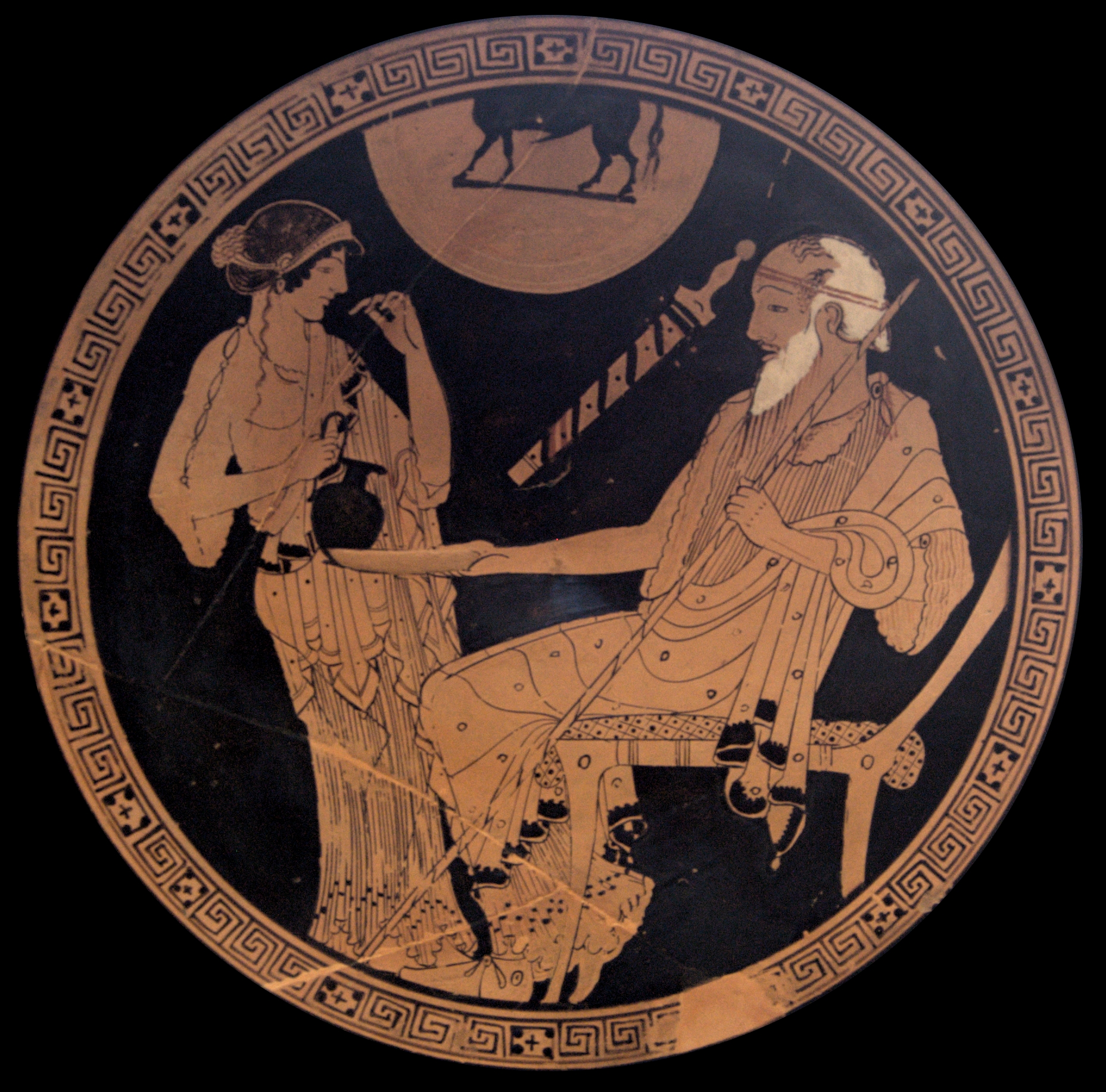
According to some sources, Briseis serves wine to Phoenix. Red-figure kylix by the Brygos Painter (c. 490 BC) Louvre G152.

In Greek mythology, Phoenix (Ancient Greek: Φοῖνιξ Phoinix, gen. Φοίνικος Phoinikos) was the son of king Amyntor. Because of a dispute with his father, Phoenix fled to Phthia, where he became king of the Dolopians, and tutor of the young Achilles, whom he accompanied to the Trojan War. After Achilles had in anger withdrawn from the war, Phoenix tried to persuade Achilles to return.

Phoenix appears as a character in the Iliad, where Homer has him tell his story. He is also mentioned several times in the Epic Cycle. There were several lost 5th-century BC tragedies titled Phoenix, which presumably told his story, and he appeared as a character in several others. Mentions of Phoenix occur in Pindar, the Palatine Anthology, Lycophron, Ovid and Hyginus, and a brief account of his story is given by the mythographer Apollodorus. Phoenix also appears in many works of ancient art from as early as the 6th century BC.

== Mythology ==
Phoenix was the son of Amyntor. A dispute with his father, concerning his father's concubine, resulted in Phoenix fleeing his homeland for Phthia, where he became a vassal of Achilles' father Peleus, the king. As told in the Iliad, on the urgings of his jealous mother (variously named as Cleobule, Hippodameia, or Alcimede), Phoenix had had sex with his father's concubine. Amyntor, discovering this, called upon the Erinyes to curse Phoenix with childlessness. In later accounts of the story, Phoenix was falsely accused by Amyntor's concubine, and blinded by his father, but Chiron restored his sight. In either case, Phoenix fled to Phthia, where Peleus made Phoenix a king of the Dolopians, and gave him his young son Achilles to raise.

Phoenix participated in the Calydonian boar hunt, and was said to have given Achilles's son the name Neoptolemus. As an old man, he went with Odysseus and Nestor to find and recruit Achilles for the Trojan War, and was Achilles's companion at Troy. After Achilles, in his anger at Agamemnon, had withdrawn from the fighting, Phoenix was part of the unsuccessful embassy sent by Agamemnon to persuade Achilles to return to the battle. After Achilles died, Phoenix was one of those sent to fetch Neoptolemus from Scyros. On his way home from Troy, Phoenix died and was buried by Neoptolemus. His tomb was said to be either in Eion, Macedonia, or in Trachis, Thessaly, nearby the "Phoenix River" which was said to have been named after the hero.

== Sources ==
=== The Iliad ===
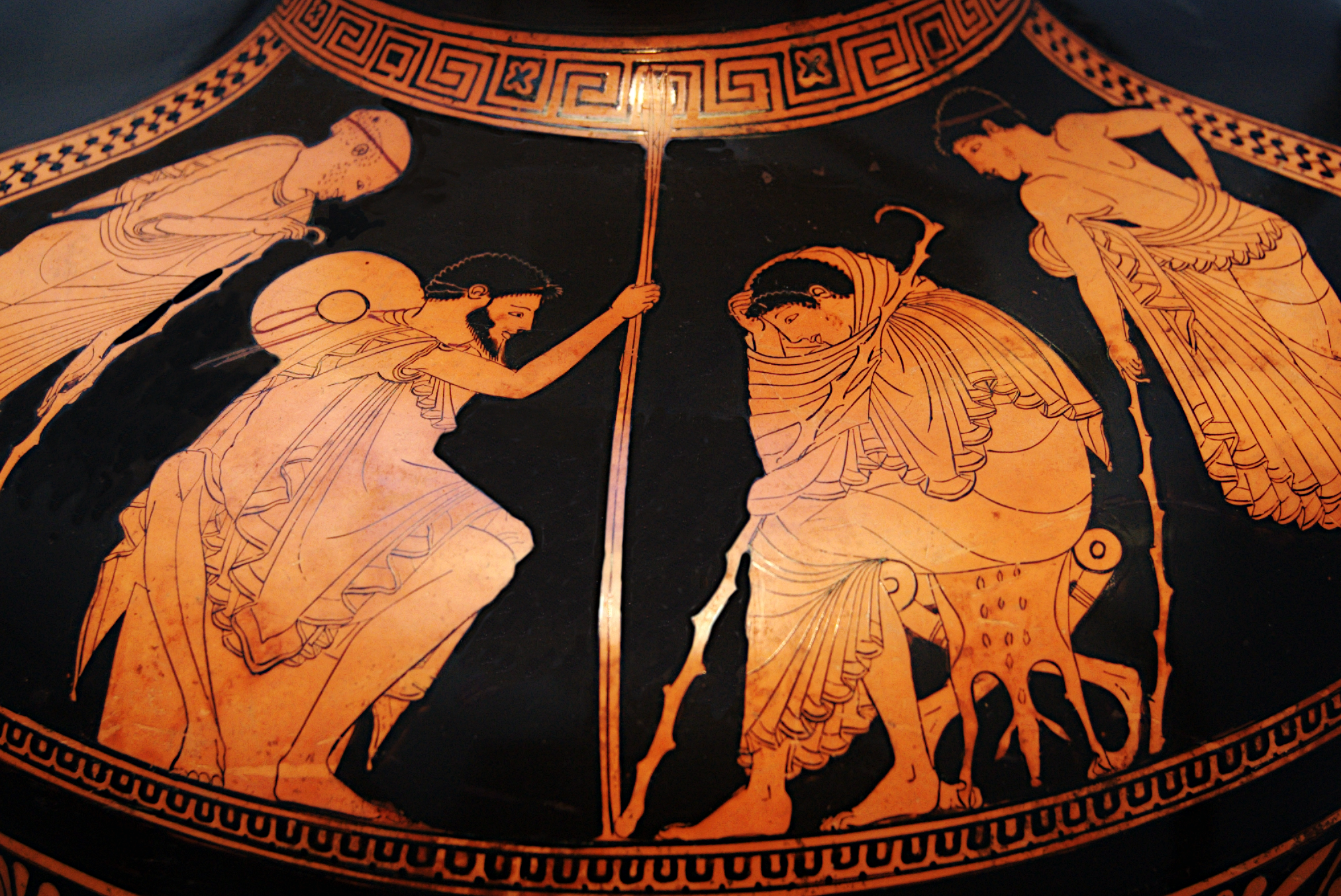
Embassy to Achilles. On the left, Phoenix standing, Odysseus seated facing Achilles seated, and Patroclus standing on the right. A red-figure hydria, by the Kleophrades Painter (c. 480 BC) Staatliche Antikensammlungen 8770.

Phoenix plays an important role in Book 9 of the Iliad of Homer. Achilles, the Greeks' greatest warrior, has withdrawn from the war because of his great anger at his ill treatment by the Greek commander Agamemnon. Phoenix, who had been in charge of Achilles's upbringing, now an old man, has accompanied Achilles to the Trojan War. Phoenix is sent by Agamemnon to Achilles's tent, as part of an embassy with Ajax and Odysseus, to persuade Achilles to return to the battle. Odysseus speaks first, presenting Agamemnon's offer of reconciliation, an appeal which Achilles rejects utterly, saying that he will leave with his ships the next morning. Next Phoenix—who as his tutor, as he reminds Achilles, has taught him "to be both a speaker of words and a doer of deeds"—begins himself a long speech covering 172 lines. Phoenix, "bursting into tears", pleads passionately with Achilles to put down his anger and return to the war. Phoenix's speech presents an "exposition of heroic, traditional ethics".

Phoenix begins his appeal, in personal terms, by reminding Achilles how he came to be a second father to Achilles. Phoenix's father was Amyntor, the son of Ormenus, and a king in Hellas. When Amyntor forsook his wife, Phoenix's mother, for a concubine, at the urging of his jealous mother, Phoenix had sex with Amyntor's concubine. To punish this crime Amyntor called upon the Erinyes to curse Phoenix with childlessness. Outraged Phoenix intended to kill Amyntor, but was finally dissuaded. Instead he decided to leave his father's kingdom. For nine days some of his friends and family kept watch over him to prevent his leaving, but finally on the tenth day he managed to escape, and fleeing through Hellas, Phoenix came to Phthia, where king Peleus, the father of Achilles, took in Phoenix, and treated him like a son. Peleus made Phoenix a king of the Dolopians. And Phoenix was given charge of the young Achilles, whom Phoenix reared as a son. Having reminded Achilles of all this, Phoenix asks Achilles to "master thy proud spirit; it beseemeth thee not to have a pitiless heart. Nay, even the very gods can bend".

Phoenix next relates two stories meant to persuade Achilles to relent. The first story concerns the Litai ("Prayers"), daughters of Zeus, who follow along after Ate ("Sin"). This story is meant to show Achilles the dangers inherent in refusing prayers of supplication. After telling the story, Phoenix again asks Achilles to "cast aside thine anger" and heed the supplication of his comrads in arms and return to the battle. Phoenix reminds Achilles that heroes of old, in their wrath, might be won over by gifts and pleadings. He then recounts the story of the hero Meleager, with its many parallels to Achilles's situation. Like Achilles, Meleager has withdrawn from battle in anger. Offering gifts, his friends and family beg Meleager to return to the battle, but he refuses them. But when his own household is threatened, finally heeding the pleas of his wife, he returns to the battle, but received no gifts and honors, for doing so. Finally Phoenix urges Achilles not to be like Meleager, but to accept the gifts and honors Agammenon has offered, before it is too late.

But Achilles, responding to Phoenix, says he has no need of such gifts and has honor enough already. Further he admonishes Phoenix "not to confound my spirit by weeping and sorrowing," on Agamemnon's behalf. Nevertheless, Achilles invites Phoenix to stay the night "and at break of day we will take counsel whether to return to our own or to tarry here."

Brief mentions of Phoenix also appear in Books 16, 17, 19, and 23. In Book 16 Phoenix leads a company of Myrmidons into battle. In Book 17, Athena takes Phoenix's form, as she urges on Menelaus in the heat of battle. In Book 19, Phoenix is among those comforting Achilles in his tent after the death of Patroclus. In Book 23, Phoenix is an umpire in Patroclus's funeral games.

=== Epic Cycle ===
Besides the Iliad a few other mentions of Phoenix, from the epic tradition, are found in the Epic Cycle, a collection of epic poems about the Trojan War. According to scholia to Iliad 19, citing the Epic Cycle, prior to the Trojan War, Phoenix was sent with Odysseus and Nestor to seek out Achilles (who, as it turns out, is hiding on Skyros disguised as a girl) to recruit him for the war. According to the Cypria, (one of the poems in the Epic Cycle) Achilles's son Neoptolemus, originally named Pyrrhus, was given the name Neoptolemus ("young soldier") by Phoenix, because Achilles was a young man when he went to war. According to Proclus' summary of the Nostoi, Phoenix, while traveling home from the Trojan War with Neoptolemus, died and was buried by Neoptolemus.

=== Later sources ===
The late sixth-century early fifth-century BC poet Pindar mentioned Phoenix, saying that he "held a throng of Dolopians, bold in the use of the sling and bringing aid to the missiles of the Danaans, tamers of horses." Phoenix appeared as a character in tragedian Aeschylus' lost play Myrmidons (c. 490–480), which included an embassy scene, and presumably Phoenix's attempt to persuade Achilles to put aside his anger and return to the battlefield.

The tragedian Sophocles, in his play Philoctetes (409 BC), tells us that after Achilles died at Troy, the Greeks received a prophecy which said that they would never take Troy unless Neoptolemus came to fight for them, so the Greeks sent Phoenix and Odysseus to Scyros to bring Neoptolemus back with them to Troy. A red-figure volute-krater (c. 470 BC), had already depicted Neoptolemus, with Phoenix and Odysseus (all named), saying goodbye to his mother and grandfather Lycomedes on Skyros (Ferrara 44701).

Sophocles, and his fellow fifth-century tragedians Euripides, and Ion of Chios, among others, all wrote plays titled Phoenix, now lost, which presumably told the story of Phoenix's conflict with his father. Nothing is known about the plays by Sophocles or Ion. However, from an allusion in Aristophanes' play The Acharnians, Euripides seems to have represented Phoenix as blind. Moreover, evidence indicates that in Euripides' version of the story, Phoenix is falsely accused of rape by his father's concubine, and is blinded by Amyntor in punishment.

The Cyzicene epigrams, the third book of the Palatine Anthology, refers to the blinding of Phoenix by Amyntor, with Phoenix's mother, here named Alcimede, trying to restrain her husband. The poet Lycophron alludes to Phoenix, and his blinding by his father, and the poet Propertius, mentions Chiron restoring Phoenix's sight.

Lycophron also connects Phoenix with Eion, where he was said to have been buried. Lycophron scholia name Phoenix's mother Cleobule, and give the concubine's name as either Clytie or Phthia. According to the A scholia to Iliad 9.448, Phoenix's mother was named Hippodameia, and the concubine Clytia.

Both the poet Ovid and the mythographer Hyginus say that Phoenix was one of the heroes to have participated in the hunt for the Calydonian Boar. And Virgil in his Aeneid, has Phoenix and Odysseus, during the sack of Troy, in a temple, in Priam's palace, standing guard over Troy's treasures.

The mythographer Apollodorus, probably drawing on Euripides' Phoenix, says that Phoenix was falsely accused of seducing Amyntor's concubine Phthia. Amyntor blinded Phoenix, but Peleus brought Phoenix to the centaur Chiron who restored his sight. Peleus then made Phoenix king of the Dolopians. Apollodorus mentions the embassy of Odysseus, Phoenix, and Ajax, to Achilles. Like Sophocles, Apollodorus says Phoenix and Odysseus were sent to bring Neoptolemus to Troy, and agreeing with Proclus, says that after the war, traveling home with Neoptolemus, Phoenix died and Neoptolemus buried him.

The Greek comic poet Eubulus wrote a play titled Phoenix, so too did the Latin poet Ennius. The 4th-century AD (?) Greek poet Quintus Smyrnaeus, in his epic poem Posthomerica, has Phoenix welcome Achilles's son Neoptolemus to Troy, and give a speech telling Neoptolemus about his father. According to the c. 4th-century AD Dictys Cretensis, Achilles, Ajax, and Phoenix were the commanders of the Greek's Trojan War fleet.

== Iconography ==
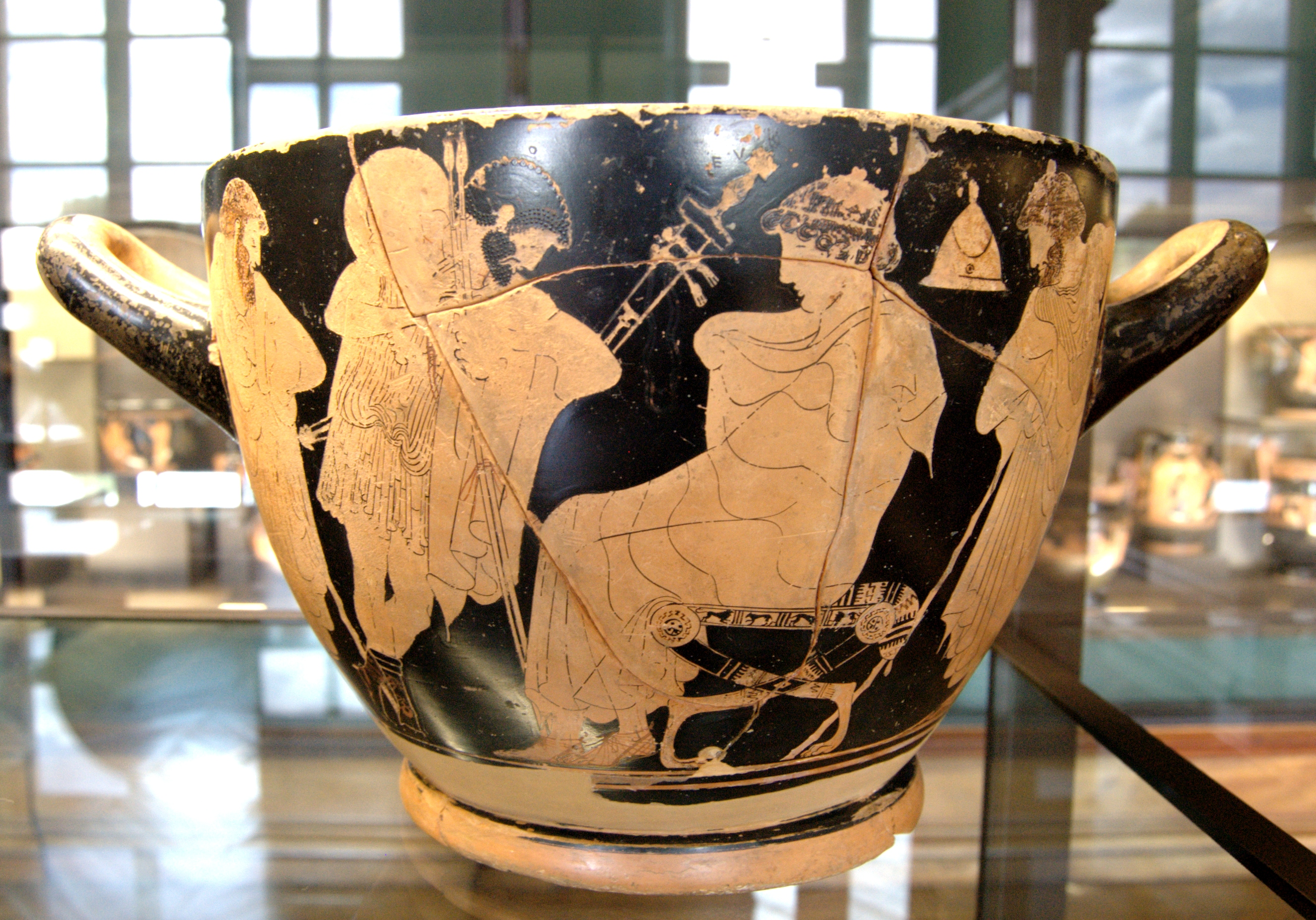
Embassy to Achilles. On the left, Ajax and Odysseus standing, facing Achilles seated and Phoenix standing on the right. A skyphos (c. 480–470 BC) Louvre G146.

Phoenix is depicted in several ancient works of art, from as early as c. 570 BC. He can often be distinguished by his white hair and beard, in contrast to the black of the other figures, as in the red-figure kylix by the Brygos Painter (c. 490 BC), where he is being served wine by Briseis (Louvre G152 shown above).

The embassy to Achilles, from Book 9 of Homer's Iliad, becomes a popular scene on Attic vases of the early fifth century BC, with Phoenix being a prominent figure. A dozen or so Attic vases depict the scene. The earliest of these, c. 490 BC, is a red-figure calyx-krater attributed to the Eucharides Painter (Louvre G163). It depicts, on the left, Phoenix standing behind a seated Odysseus, both facing right, and on the right, Diomedes (rather than the expected Ajax) standing behind a seated Achilles, both facing left, all named by inscription. Though without his usual white hair, Phoenix here is still recognizably older than the other three men. Other vases showing similar embassy scenes include: Antikensammlungen 8770 (shown above), and Louvre G146 (shown right).

Phoenix also appears on several other vases. On a black-figure Tyrrhenian amphora, c. 570 BC, (London 1897.0727.2), Phoenix is shown as part of a scene depicting Polyxena's slaughter at the tomb of Achilles. While Neoptolemus cuts Polyxena's throat, Phoenix stands on the far right, with his back turned looking away (perhaps disapproving or unable to watch). As noted above, Phoenix appears with Odysseus and Neoptolemos on a red-figure volute-krater (c. 470 BC), in a scene depicting Neoptolemos' departure from Skyros (Ferrara 44701). Phoenix is probably also depicted on a red-figure kylix, by Euphronios, leading a procession, followed by a woman with hand to head (Thetis?) looking back, Ajax carrying Achilles's corpse, and a warrior (probably Odysseus) at the rear of the procession (J. Paul Getty Museum 77.AE.20).

Phoenix appears on both sides of an Athenian red-figure stamnos, c. 480 BC, attributed to the Triptolemos Painter (Antikenmuseum BS 477). The B. side is another embassy to Achilles scene. Phoenix, his long white hair tied up in back, stands on the right, behind the seated Achilles. On the A. side, Phoenix on the left, named by inscription, restrains either Ajax or Achilles, while Priam on the right, also depicted with long white hair tied up in the back, restrains Hector. If the warrior being restrained by Phoenix is Ajax, then this would appear to be Ajax's dual with Hector from Iliad 7, otherwise this might be Achilles's dual with Hektor, following the death of Patroclus, although the Iliad does not mention Phoenix's involvement in either dual. A related scene occurs on an Athenian red-figure amphora (c. 480 BC) by the Kleophrades Painter (Martin von Wagner Museum L508). On the A. side, Phoenix (named) restrains a warrior (Ajax?), while on the B. side, another old man (Priam?) restrains Hektor (named).
