= Orminium =

Orminium or Orminion (Ancient Greek: Ὁρμίνιον, Ὀρμίνιον, or Ὀρμένιον) was a town of Magnesia in ancient Thessaly. Strabo say that Orminium is situated at the foot of Mt. Pelion near the Pagasaean Gulf, at the distance of 27 stadia from Demetrias, on the road passing through Iolcus, which was 7 stadia from Demetrias and 20 from Orminium.

Its site is unlocated.
