= Areilycus =

Ancient Greek mythological figures

In Greek mythology, Areilycus (Ancient Greek: Ἀρηίλυκος, romanized: Arēïlykos, lit. 'warlike wolf' or 'wolf of Ares') was the name of two mythical personages in Homer's Iliad

- Areilycus, one was the father of Archesilaus and Prothoenor. He is more commonly known as Archilycus.
- Areilycus, son of Menoetius, who was wounded in the thigh while fleeing by Patroclus. The spear broke Areilycus's bone, and the text strongly implies that Areilycus dies from his wound. Areilycus is frequently referenced as one character in the Iliad whose death does not have any metaphor or symbolism about it, and whose involvement in the narrative seems to be a plain description of action.
