= Teutamides =

In Greek mythology, Teutamides (Ancient Greek: Τευταμίδης) or Teutamus (Tεύταμoς) was a king of Larissa, Thessaly. He was the son of Amyntor and a great-grandson of Pelasgus; his own son was Nanas. His other son, Lethus, is known as the father of the Trojan War participants Hippothous and Pylaeus. It was during the funerary games of Teutamides' father that Perseus accidentally killed Acrisius with a discus.
