= Clonius =

Various characters in Greek mythology

In Greek mythology, the name Clonius (/ˈkloʊniəs/; Ancient Greek: Κλονίος, romanized: Kloníos, lit. 'tumult', 'confused motion' or 'turmoil') may refer to:

- Clonius, one of the Achaean leaders in the Trojan War, son of either Alegenor, or of Alector and Acteis, or of Lacritus and Cleobule, and in the latter case brother of Leitus; he came from Boeotia and commanded nine ships. He was killed by Agenor.
- Clonius, an illegitimate son of Priam.
- Clonius, a companion of Aeneas, who was killed by Turnus.
- Clonius, another companion of Aeneas, who was killed by Messapus.
- Clonius, a defender of Thebes in the war of the Seven against Thebes, killed by Tydeus.
