= Peneleos =

Mythical character

In Greek mythology, Peneleos (Ancient Greek: Πηνελέως, romanized: Pēneléōs) or, less commonly, Peneleus (Πηνέλεος Pēnéleos), son of Hippalcimus (Hippalmus) and Asterope, was an Achaean soldier in the Trojan War.

== Mythology ==
Before the war began he was said to have sailed with the Argonauts; he also was one of the suitors of Helen, which obliged him to join in the campaign against Troy. He came from Boeotia and commanded 12 ships. It is also said that Peneleos was chosen to command the Boeotian troops because Tisamenus, son and successor of Thersander, was still too young.

When Poemander attempted to avoid serving in the Trojan War, he accidentally slew his own son Leucippus, and Peneleos was among those who escorted him to be purified by Elephenor on Chalcis.

Peneleos killed two Trojans, Ilioneus and Lycon, was wounded by Polydamas and was killed by Eurypylus (son of Telephus). He left a son Opheltes, whose own son (Peneleos' grandson) Damasichthon succeeded Autesion, son of Tisamenus, as the ruler over Thebes.

His descendant, Philotas of Thebes, was said to be the founder of Priene in Ionia.

== See also ==
- Thersanon
- Scamandrius
