= Boeotus =

In Greek mythology, Boeotus (/biːˈoʊtəs/; Ancient Greek: Βοιωτός, romanized: Boiōtós) may refer to the following personages:

- Boeotus, son of Poseidon and Arne.
- Boeotus, son of Itonus and the nymph Melanippe, another possible eponym of Boeotia. His father is apparently not the same as Itonus, son of the first Boeotus.
