= Arcesilaus (mythology) =

Son of Archilycus in Greek mythology

Arcesilaus (Ancient Greek: Ἀρκεσίλαος, romanized: Arkesilaos, lit. 'defender of the people' or 'one who prevails for the people') in Greek mythology, was a son of Lycus (or Areilycus) and Theobule, brother of Prothoenor, and was the leader of the Boeotians in the Trojan War. He led his people to Troy in ten ships, and was slain by Hector.

In one source though, this Arcesilaus is called a son of Alector and Cleobule, and thus half-brother to Leitus and Clonius. He was killed by Hector. Leitus brought his remains back to Boeotia and buried them near Lebadea, on the banks of River Hercyna.
