= Prothous =

In Greek mythology, Prothous (Ancient Greek: Πρόθοος Prothoös) may refer to:

- Prothous, an Arcadian prince as one of the 50 sons of the impious King Lycaon either by the naiad Cyllene, Nonacris or by unknown woman. He and his brothers were the most nefarious and carefree of all people. To test them, Zeus visited them in the form of a peasant. These brothers mixed the entrails of a child into the god's meal, whereupon the enraged Zeus threw the meal over the table. Aegaeon was killed, along with his brothers and their father, by a lightning bolt of the god.
- Prothous, son of Thestius and brother of Althaea. He was one of the Calydonian Boar Hunters.
- Prothous, son of the Aetolian Agrius, killed by Diomedes.
- Prothous of Argos, a warrior in the army of the Seven against Thebes. He cast lots to assign places in the chariot race at the funeral games of Opheltes.
- Prothous, a defender of Thebes against the Seven, killed by Tydeus.
- Prothous, son of Tenthredon and either Eurymache or Cleobule the daughter of Eurytus. He was one of the commander of the Magnetes who dwelt around mount Pelion and the river Peneus and one of the Greek leaders in the Trojan War. Prothous brought forty ships to Troy. According to one version, Prothous, together with Meges and a number of others, died as a result of a shipwreck near Cape Caphereus of Euboea; in another version, Prothous, Eurypylus and Guneus ended up in Libya and settled there.
- Prothous, one of the Suitors of Penelope who came from Same along with other 22 wooers. He, with the other suitors, was killed by Odysseus with the aid of Eumaeus, Philoetius, and Telemachus.
