= Menelaus =

King of Sparta, husband of Helen of Troy

- King of Sparta
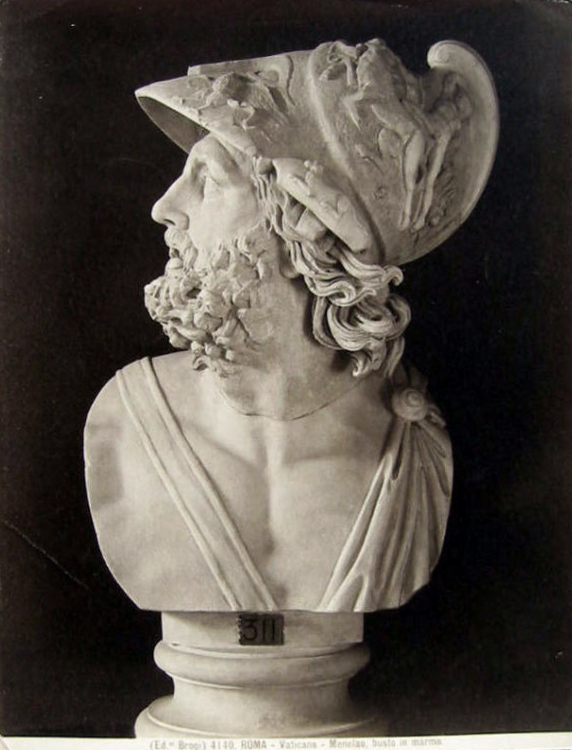
- Marble bust of Menelaus, Vatican Museums

Genealogy
- Parents: Atreus (father); Aerope (mother)
- Siblings: Agamemnon, Anaxibia
- Consorts: Helen; Pieris or Tereis; Cnossia
- Offspring: Hermione, Nicostratus, Pleisthenes, Aethiolas, Megapenthes, Xenodamus
- Dynasty: Atreid Dynasty

In Greek mythology, Menelaus (/ˌmɛnəˈleɪ.əs/; Ancient Greek: Μενέλαος, romanized: Menélaos) was a king of Sparta. According to the Iliad, the Trojan War began as a result of Menelaus' wife, Helen, fleeing to Troy with the Trojan prince Paris. Menelaus was a central figure in the Trojan War, leading the Spartan contingent of the Greek army, under his elder brother Agamemnon, king of Mycenae. Prominent in both the Iliad and Odyssey, Menelaus was also popular in Greek vase painting and Greek tragedy, the latter more as a hero of the Trojan War than as a member of the doomed House of Atreus.

== Description ==
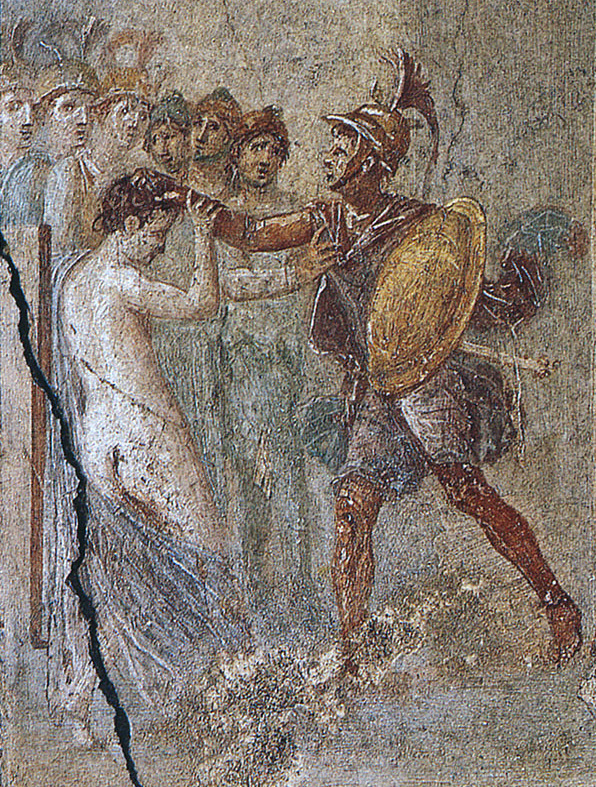
Menelaus captures Helen in Troy, detail of fresco in Pompeii

In the account of Dares the Phrygian, Menelaus was described as "of moderate stature, auburn-haired, and handsome. He had a pleasing personality."

Homer uses the epithet "ξανθός," transliterated as "xanthos," to describe Menelaus, a word often translated as fair-haired.

== Family ==
Menelaus was a descendant of Pelops son of Tantalus. He was the younger brother of Agamemnon, and the husband of Helen of Troy. According to the usual version of the story, followed by the Iliad and Odyssey of Homer, Agamemnon and Menelaus were the sons of Atreus, king of Mycenae, and Aerope, daughter of the Cretan king Catreus. However, according to another tradition, Agamemnon and Menelaus were the sons of Atreus's son Pleisthenes, with their mother being Aerope, Cleolla, or Eriphyle. According to this tradition Pleisthenes died young, with Agamemnon and Menelaus being raised by Atreus. Agamemnon and Menelaus had a sister Anaxibia (or Astyoche) who married Strophius, the son of Crisus.

According to the Odyssey, Menelaus had only one child by Helen, a daughter named Hermione; and an illegitimate son, Megapenthes, by a slave. Other sources mention other sons of Menelaus by either Helen, or slaves. A scholiast on Sophocles's Electra quotes Hesiod as saying that after Hermione, Helen also bore Menelaus a son Nicostratus, while according to a Cypria fragment, Menelaus and Helen had a son Pleisthenes. The mythographer Apollodorus, tells us that Megapenthes's mother was a slave "Pieris, an Aetolian, or, according to Acusilaus, ... Tereis", and that Menelaus had another illegitimate son Xenodamas by another slave girl, Cnossia, while according to the geographer Pausanias, Megapenthes and Nicostratus were sons of Menelaus by a slave. The scholiast on Iliad 3.175 mentions Nicostratus and Aethiolas as two sons of Helen (by Menelaus?) worshipped by the Lacedaemonians and another son of Helen by Menelaus, Maraphius, from whom descended the Persian Maraphions.

== Mythology ==
=== Accession and reign ===
Although early authors, such as Aeschylus, refer in passing to Menelaus's early life, detailed sources are quite late, post-dating 5th-century BC Greek tragedy. According to these sources, Menelaus's father, Atreus, had been feuding with his brother Thyestes over the throne of Mycenae. After a back-and-forth struggle that featured adultery, incest, and cannibalism, Thyestes gained the throne after his son Aegisthus murdered Atreus. As a result, Atreus's sons, Menelaus and Agamemnon, went into exile. They first stayed with King Polypheides of Sicyon, and later with King Oeneus of Calydon. But when they thought the time was ripe to dethrone Mycenae's hostile ruler, they returned. Assisted by King Tyndareus of Sparta, they drove Thyestes away, and Agamemnon took the throne for himself.

When it was time for Tyndareus's stepdaughter Helen to marry, many kings and princes came to seek her hand. Among the contenders were Odysseus, Menestheus, Ajax the Great, Patroclus, and Idomeneus. Most offered opulent gifts. Tyndareus would accept none of the gifts, nor would he send any of the suitors away for fear of offending them and giving grounds for a quarrel. Odysseus promised to solve the problem in a satisfactory manner if Tyndareus would support him in his courting of Tyndareus's niece Penelope, the daughter of Icarius. Tyndareus readily agreed, and Odysseus proposed that, before the decision was made, all the suitors should swear a most solemn oath to defend the chosen husband in any quarrel. Then it was decreed that straws were to be drawn for Helen's hand. The suitor who won was Menelaus (Tyndareus, not to displease the mighty Agamemnon offered him another of his daughters, Clytaemnestra). The rest of the suitors swore their oaths, and Helen and Menelaus were married, Menelaus becoming a ruler of Sparta with Helen after Tyndareus and Leda abdicated the thrones.

Their supposed palace (ἀνάκτορον) has been discovered (the excavations started in 1926 and continued until 1995) in Pellana, Laconia, to the north-west of modern (and classical) Sparta. Other archaeologists consider that Pellana is too far away from other Mycenaean centres to have been the "capital of Menelaus".

According to tradition Menelaus founded the port-city Menelai Portus on the coast of Marmarica in Northern Africa.

Regnal titles
Preceded by Tyndareus (second reign)	King of Sparta	Succeeded by Orestes

=== Trojan War ===
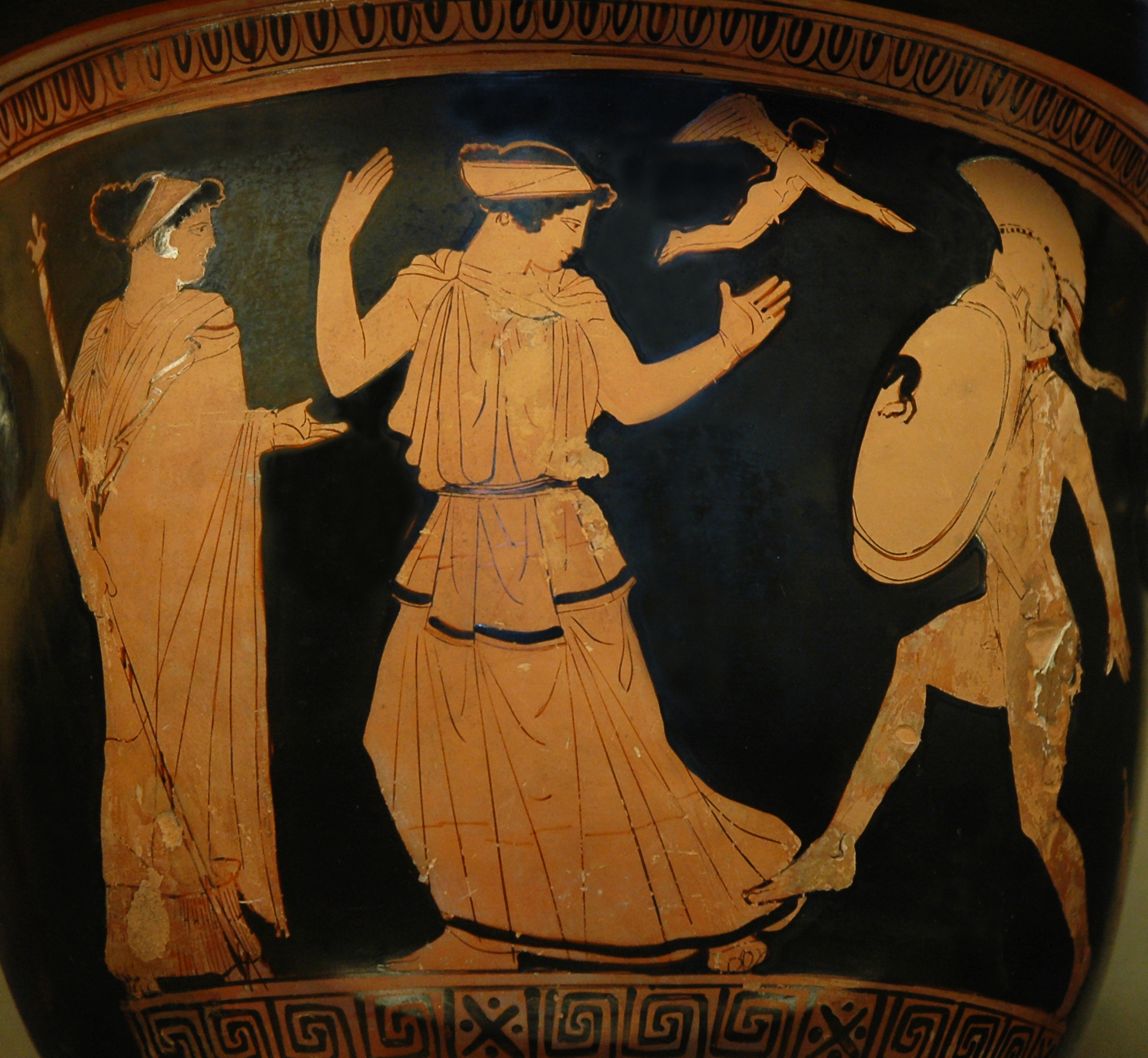
Menelaus regains Helen, detail of an Attic red-figure crater, c. 450–440 BC, found in Gnatia (now Egnazia, Italy).

According to legend, in return for awarding her a golden apple inscribed "to the fairest," Aphrodite promised Paris the most beautiful woman in all the world. After concluding a diplomatic mission to Sparta during the latter part of which Menelaus was absent to attend the funeral of his maternal grandfather Catreus in Crete, Paris ran off to Troy with Helen despite his brother Hector's prohibition. Invoking the oath of Tyndareus, Menelaus and Agamemnon raised a fleet of a thousand ships and went to Troy to secure Helen's return; the Trojans refused, providing a casus belli for the Trojan War.

Homer's Iliad is the most comprehensive source for Menelaus's exploits during the Trojan War. In Book 3, Paris challenges Menelaus to a duel for Helen's return. Menelaus soundly beats Paris, but before he can kill him and claim victory, Aphrodite spirits Paris away inside the walls of Troy. In Book 4, while the Greeks and Trojans squabble over the duel's winner, Athena inspires the Trojan Pandarus to shoot Menelaus with his bow and arrow. However, Athena never intended for Menelaus to die and she protects him from the arrow of Pandarus. Menelaus is wounded in the abdomen, and the fighting resumes. Later, in Book 17, Homer gives Menelaus an extended aristeia as the hero retrieves the corpse of Patroclus from the battlefield.

According to Hyginus, Menelaus killed eight men in the war, and was one of the Greeks hidden inside the Trojan Horse. During the sack of Troy, Menelaus killed Deiphobus, who had married Helen after the death of Paris.

Helen flees from Menelaus' sword, clinging to a statue of Athena. Etruscan bronze mirror, 4th century BC, from Cerveteri.

There are four versions of Menelaus's and Helen's reunion on the night of the sack of Troy:

- Menelaus sought out Helen in the conquered city. Raging at her infidelity, he raised his sword to kill her, but as he saw her weeping at his feet, begging for her life, Menelaus's wrath instantly left him. He took pity on her and decided to take her back as his wife.
- Menelaus resolved to kill Helen, but her irresistible beauty prompted him to drop his sword and take her back to his ship "to punish her at Sparta", as he claimed.
- According to the Bibliotheca, Menelaus raised his sword in front of the temple in the central square of Troy to kill her, but his wrath went away when he saw her rending her clothes in anguish, revealing her naked breasts.
- A similar version by Stesichorus in "Ilion's Conquest" narrated that Menelaus surrendered her to his soldiers to stone her to death, but when she ripped the front of her robes, the Achaean warriors were stunned by her beauty and the stones fell harmlessly from their hands as they stared at her.

=== After the war ===
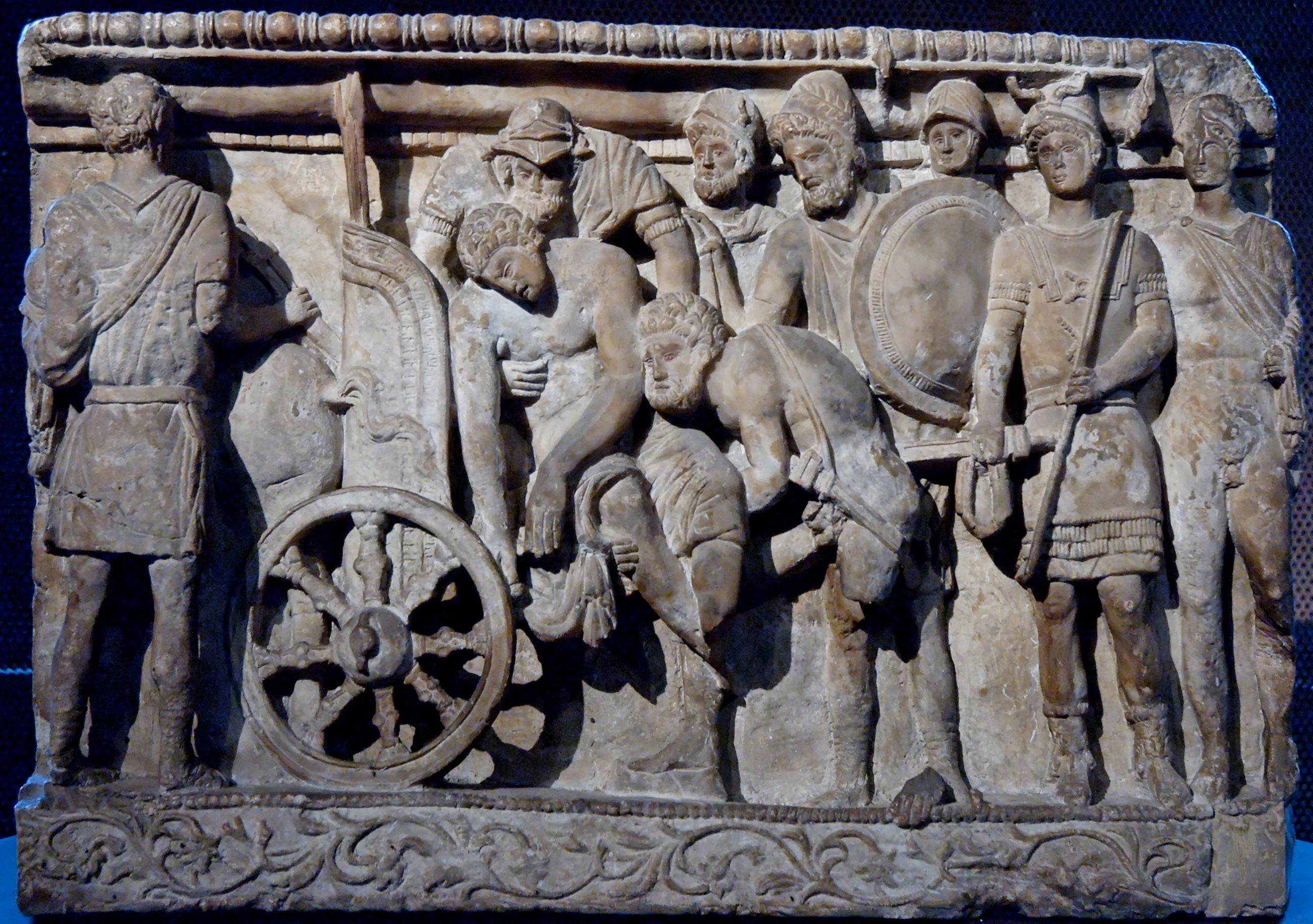
Menelaus and Meriones lifting Patroclus's corpse on a cart while Odysseus looks on; alabaster urn, Etruscan artwork from Volterra, 2nd century BC

As they prepared to sail home with the spoils of war, the goddess Athena caused a quarrel between Menelaus and his brother Agamemnon. The goddess, who had previously supported the Greeks, was angry with them because not all of them behaved prudently or justly. After an angry exchange, Agamemnon stayed at Troy to perform sacrifices whilst Menelaus set sail immediately.

Book 4 of the Odyssey provides an account of Menelaus's return from Troy and his homelife in Sparta. When visited by Odysseus's son Telemachus, Menelaus recounts his voyage home. As happened to many Greeks, Menelaus's homebound fleet was blown by storms to Crete and Egypt where they were becalmed, unable to sail away. They trapped Proteus and forced him to reveal how to make the voyage home. They made it back eight years after leaving Troy.

In Herodotus' account, it was not Helen but a phantom who went to Troy. She had spent the war in Egypt and was there reunited with her husband. Contrary winds detained the couple, leading Menelaus to sacrifice two Egyptian children in order to escape.

Once back in Sparta, he and Helen appear to have a harmonious married life—he holding no grudge at her having run away with a lover and she feeling no restraint in telling anecdotes of her life inside besieged Troy. However, some scholars detect underlying conflict. Menelaus undercuts Helen's tale of loyalty to Greece with a story of his own, where she tries to expose the soldiers hidden inside the Trojan horse.

Menelaus does seem to be pained that he and Helen have no male heir, and is shown to be fond of Megapenthes and Nicostratus, his sons by slave women.

Menelaus and Helen were worshipped at the Menelaion in Therapne. Of all the ancient authors, only Pausanias mentions that Menelaus and Helen were buried there after their deaths. According to another legend recorded by Ptolemy Chennus and Photios I of Constantinople, both of them were sacrificed by Iphigenia to Artemis in Taurus of Scythia. A Rhodian legend recorded by Pausanias states that after Menelaus' death, Helen was driven out by Megapenthes and Nicostratus, forcing her to flee to Rhodes where she was murdered by Polyxo.

According to Homer's Odyssey on the other hand, it was ordained that Menelaus would not die and would instead be taken to the Elysium. Per Euripides' Helen, Menelaus will spend his afterlife on the Isle of the Blessed. It has been noted Menelaus is undeniably unhappy despite this promised immortality in the Odyssey, which has similarities to Odysseus' imprisonment on Calypso's isle. As per Book 11 of the epic, his brother Agamemnon's ghost dwells separately in the Asphodel Meadows.

The Lindos Chronicle describes dedications attributed to Menelaus: a leather cap associated with Paris and a dagger, which Menelaus supposedly dedicated at the temple to Athena at Lindos.

== In vase painting ==
Menelaus appears in Greek vase painting in the 6th to 4th centuries BC, such as: Menelaus's reception of Paris at Sparta; his retrieval of Patroclus's corpse; and his reunion with Helen.

Ajax the Great retrieves the body of Achilles. To the right, Menelaus fights Paris. Attic black-figure amphora, c. 510 BC

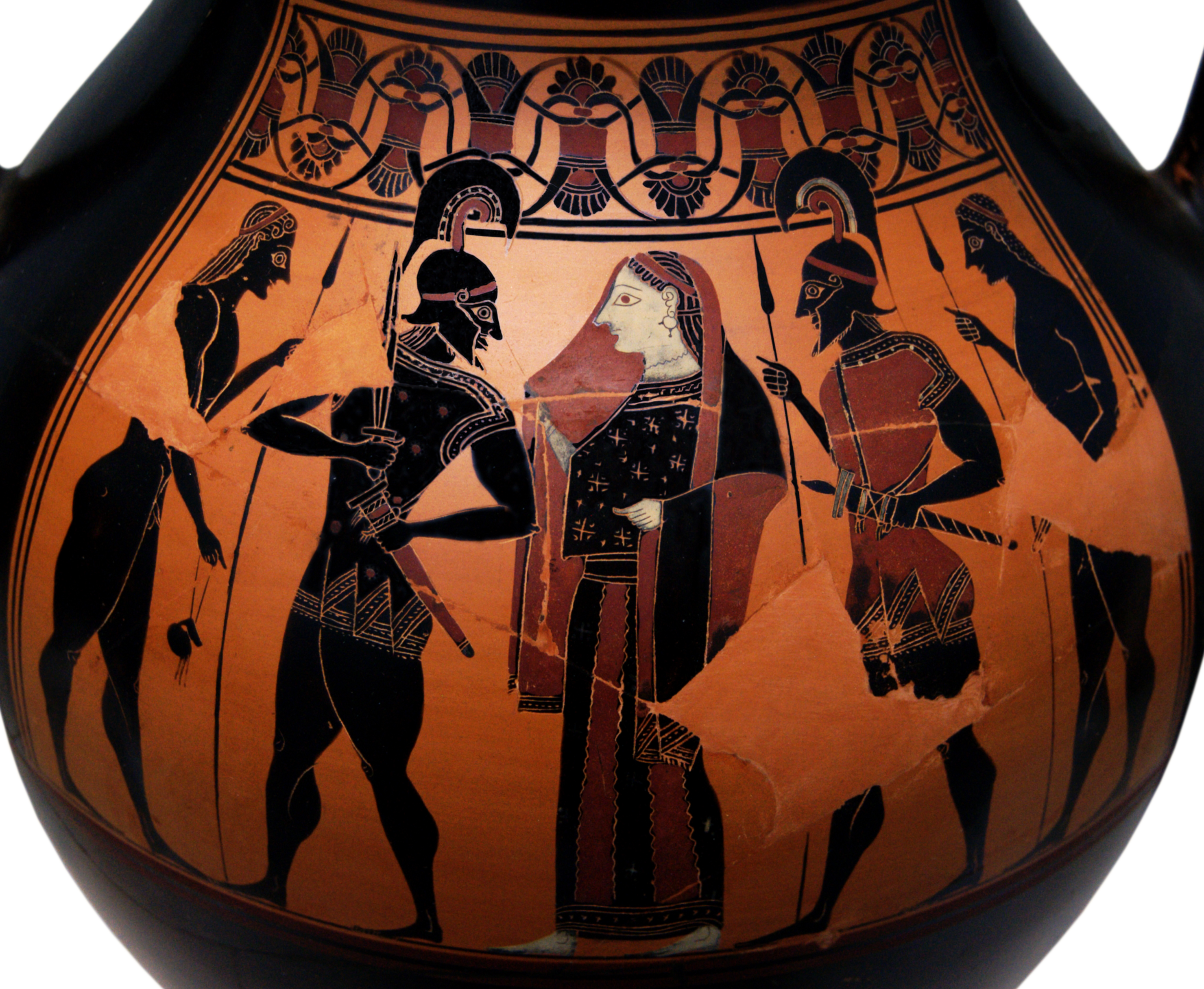
Menelaus reclaims Helen. Attic black-figure amphora, c. 550 BC

Menelaus (far-left) approaches Helen whilst Aphrodite stands between them. On the other side, Ajax the Lesser seizes Cassandra. Apulian red figure volute-krater, c. 330-310 BC

Menelaus held back by Eros, dropping his sword. Apulian red figure volute-krater, c. 350-340 BC

Menelaus leading Helen. Attic red figure kalpis, c. 480 BC

Eros flying towards Menelaus as he pursues Helen. Attic red figure column-krater, c. 460 BC

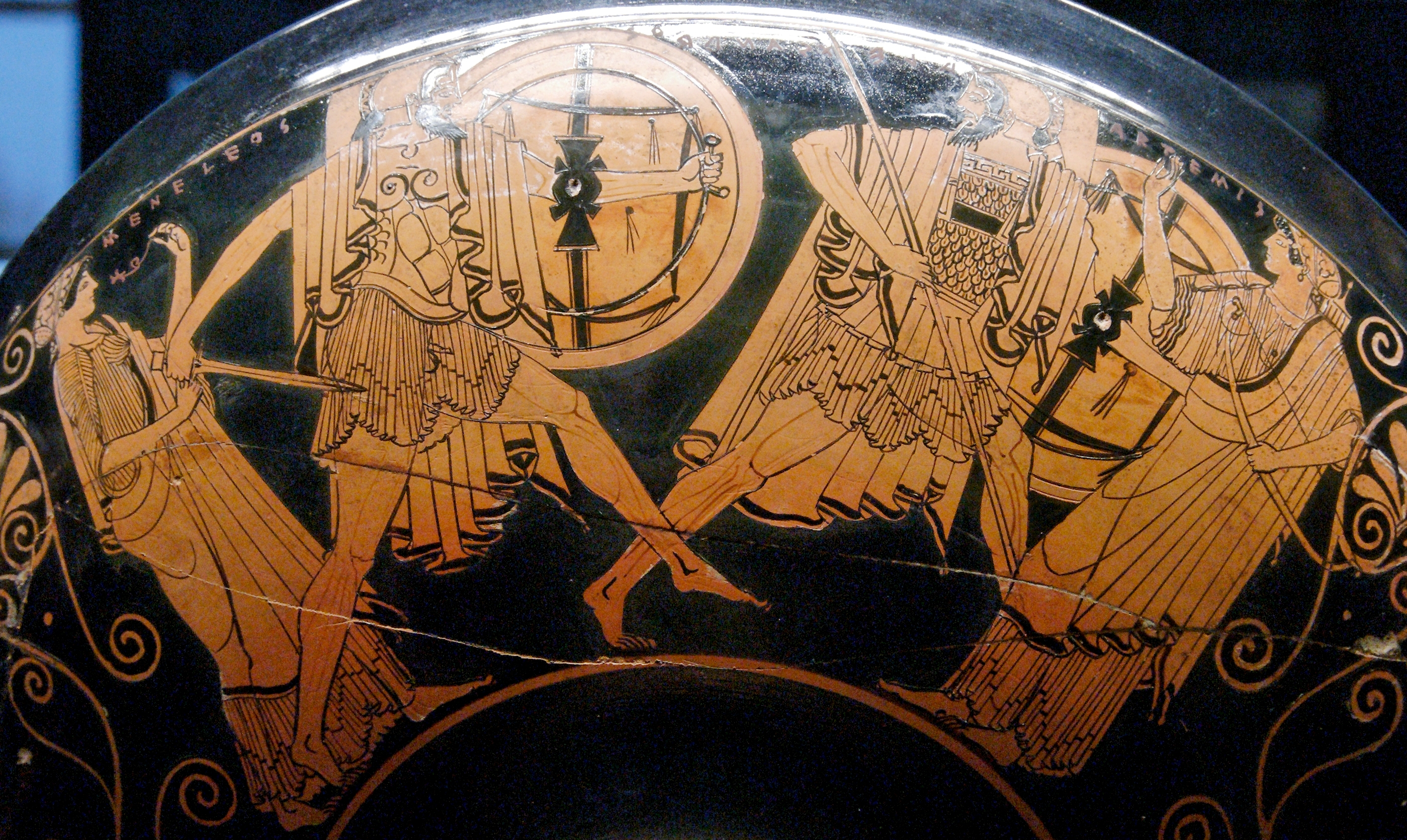
Menelaus pursues Paris. Attic red-figure kylix, c. 490–460 BC

Menelaus pursues Helen. Attic red figure hydria, c. 450-430 BC

== In Greek tragedy ==
Menelaus appears as a character in a number of 5th-century Greek tragedies: Sophocles's Ajax, and Euripides's Andromache, Helen, Orestes, Iphigenia at Aulis, and The Trojan Women.

== See also ==
- 1647 Menelaus, Jovian asteroid
- USS Menelaus (ARL-13)
- Menelaus (lunar crater)
