= List of Amazons =

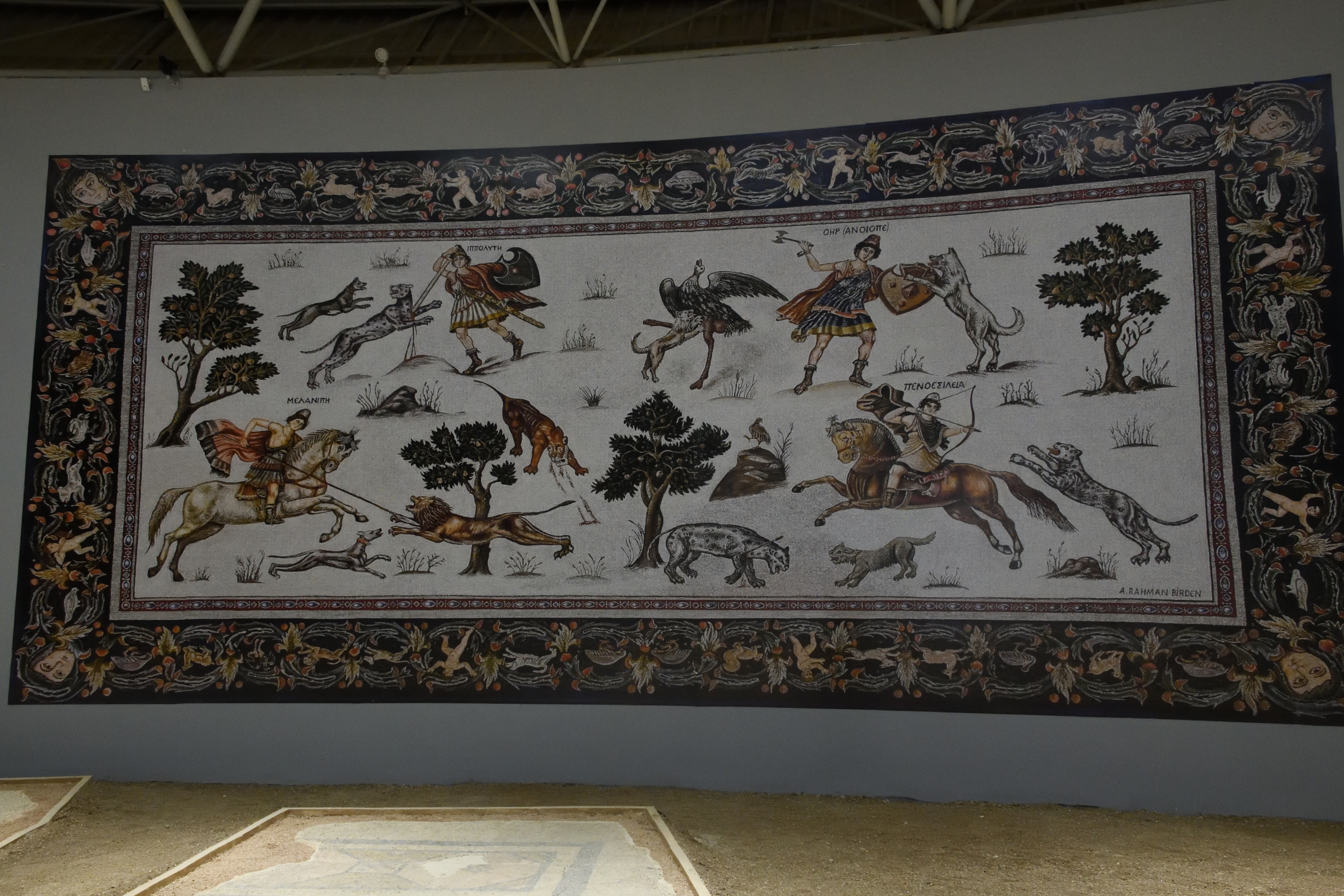
Reconstruction of the late antique Hunting Amazons mosaic

The Amazons were a group or race of female warriors in Ancient Greek mythology. Most of them are only briefly named in one or two sources, either as companions of Penthesilea at the Trojan War, or as being killed by Heracles during his 12 labours.

== Queens ==
- Otrera
- Hippolyta
- Penthesilea
- Andromache
- Lampedo and Marpesia
- Orithyia
- Myrina
- Eurypyle
- Thalestris

== Mythology ==
=== Labour of Heracles ===
Many stories about Heracles and his 12 labours mention different Amazons being killed by him. These include Alcippe, Asteria, Celaeno, Deianira, Eriboea, Eurybia, Marpe, Philippis, Phoebe, Prothoe, Tecmessa. Others, like Aella and Pantariste, fought Heracles but weren't killed.

=== Trojan War ===
John Tzetzes gives in his Posthomerica a list of Amazons who went with queen Penthesilea to the Trojan War and were killed in battle: Anchimache, Andro, Androdaixa, Antianeira, Aspidocharme, Chalcaor, Cnemis, Enchesimargos, Eurylophe, Gortyessa, Iodoce, Ioxeia, Oistrophe, Pharetre, Thorece, Toxoanassa, and Toxophone.

Quintus Smyrnaeus, in his Posthomerica, also gives a list of the companions of Penthesilea at Troy who were killed there by the Greek warriors. Achilles killed Antandre, Antibrote, Harmothoe, Hippothoe, and Polemusa; Diomedes killed Alcibie and Derimacheia, Idomeneus of Crete killed Bremusa, Podarces killed Clonie after she had killed his comrade Menippus, Ajax the Lesser killed Derinoe after she had killed Laogonus, and Meriones killed Evandre and Thermodosa.

== Hyginus' list ==
- Agave
- Antioche
- Clymene
- Dioxippe
- Glauce
- Iphinome
- Laomache
- Ocyale
- Polydora
- Theseis
- Xanthe

== Other named Amazons ==
- Alke
- Antiope
- Euryale
- Gryne
- Lyce
- Lysippe
- Melanippe
- Menippe
- Molpadia
- Myrto
- Mytilene
- Sinope

== Amazons named in non-literary sources ==
Some Amazons are not known from literary sources, but only from inscriptions on vases.

| Ainia; Ainippe; Alexandre; Alkaia; Alkinoa; Amynomene; Anaxilea; Androdameia; Andromeda; Antimache; Areto | Areximacha; Aristomache; Barkida; Charope; Chrysis; Creusa; Deinomache; Dolope; Doris; Echephyle; Eumache | Euope; Eurypyleia; Hegeso; Hippo; Hippomache; Hipponike; Hyp(s)opyle; Hypsepyle; Iole; Iphito; Kallie | Kepes; Kleoptoleme; Kydoime; Laodoke; Lykopis; Melousa; Mimnousa; Oigme; Xanthippe; Okypous | Peisianassa; Pisto; Pyrgomache; Teisipyle; Telepyleia; Thero; Thraso; Toxaris; Taxis; Toxophile |

== See also ==
- List of valkyrie names
