= Amazons =

Female warriors and hunters in Greek mythology

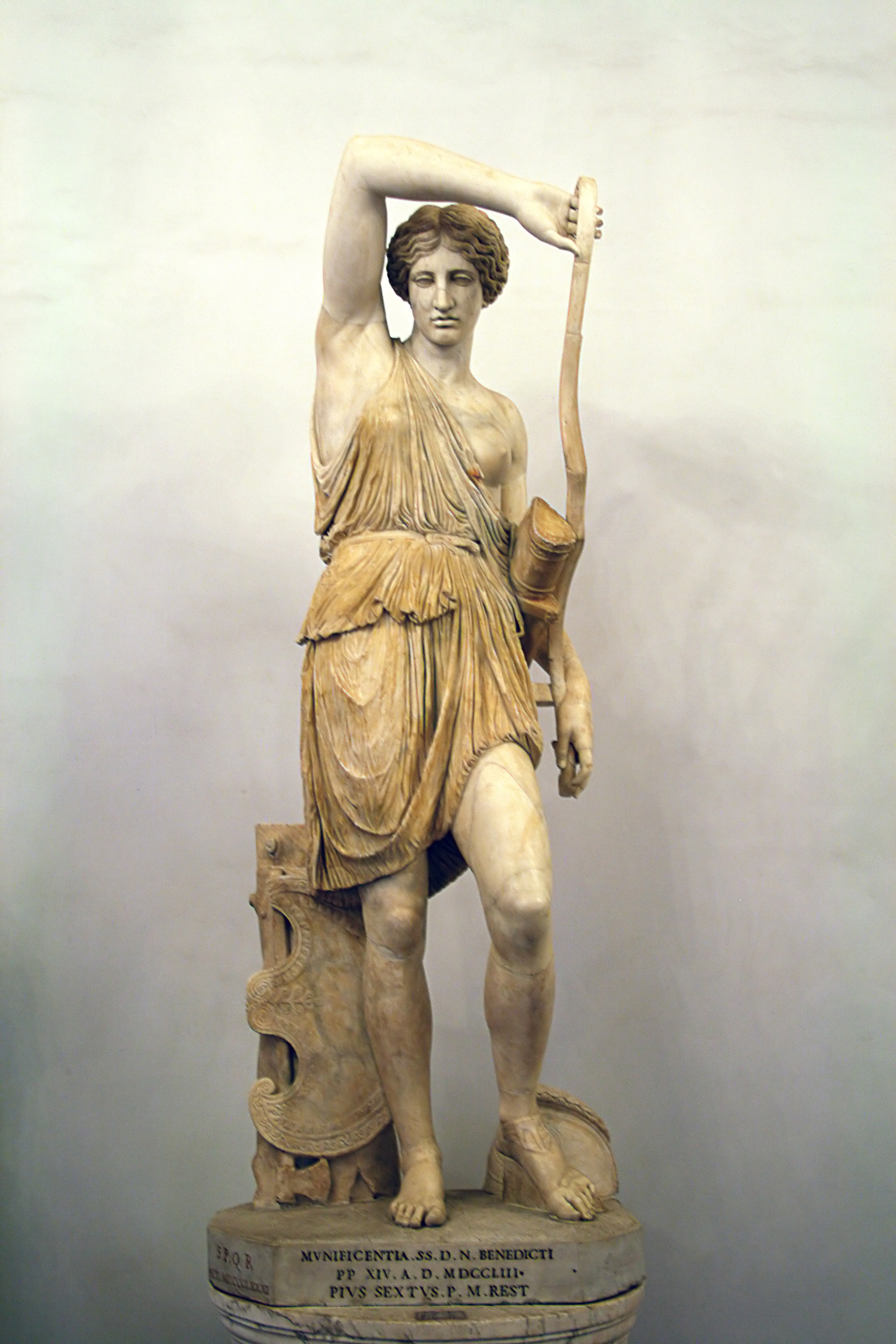
Wounded Amazon of the Capitoline Museums, Rome

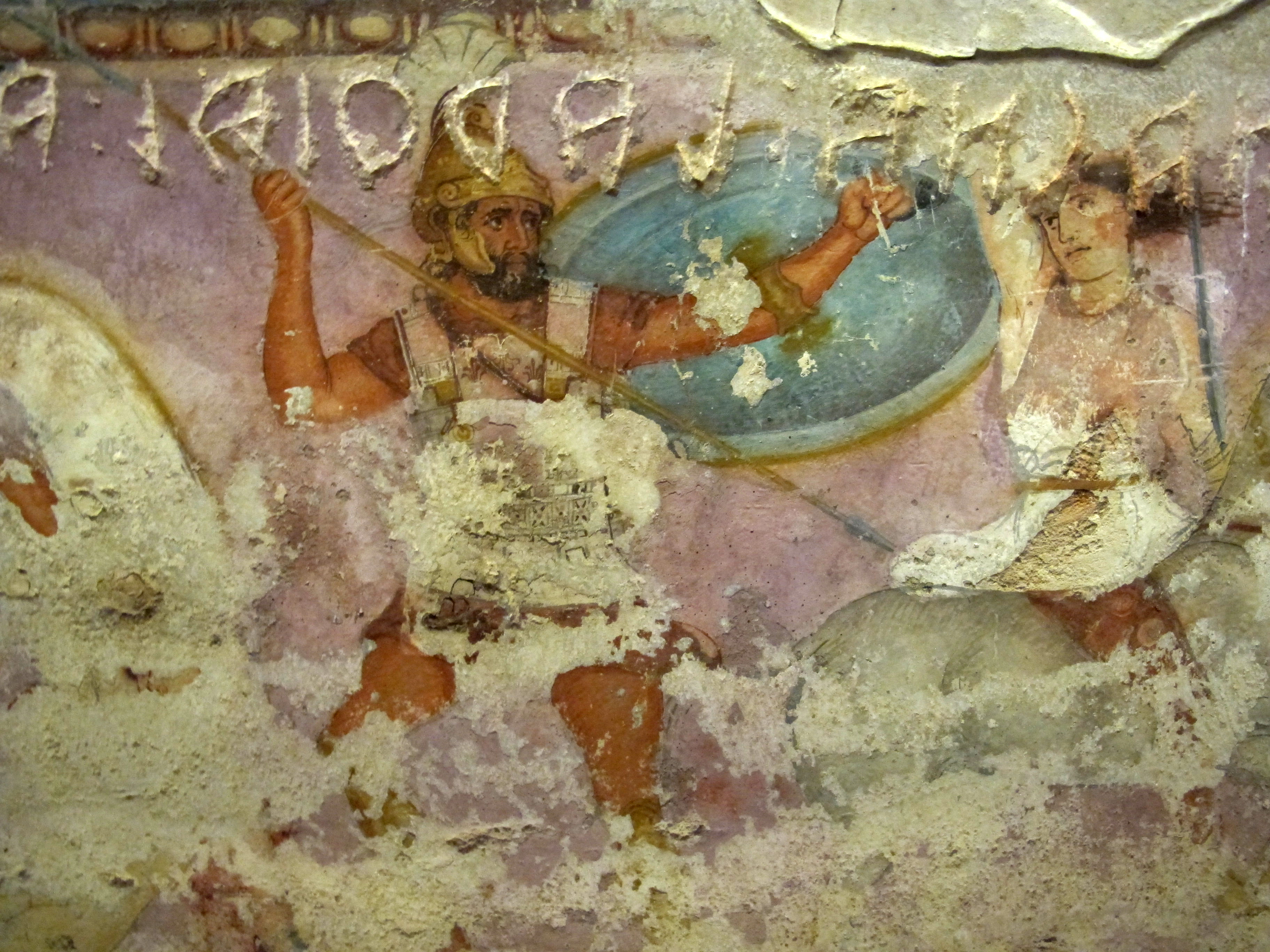
A Greek fighting an Amazon; detail from painted sarcophagus found in Italy, 350–325 BCE

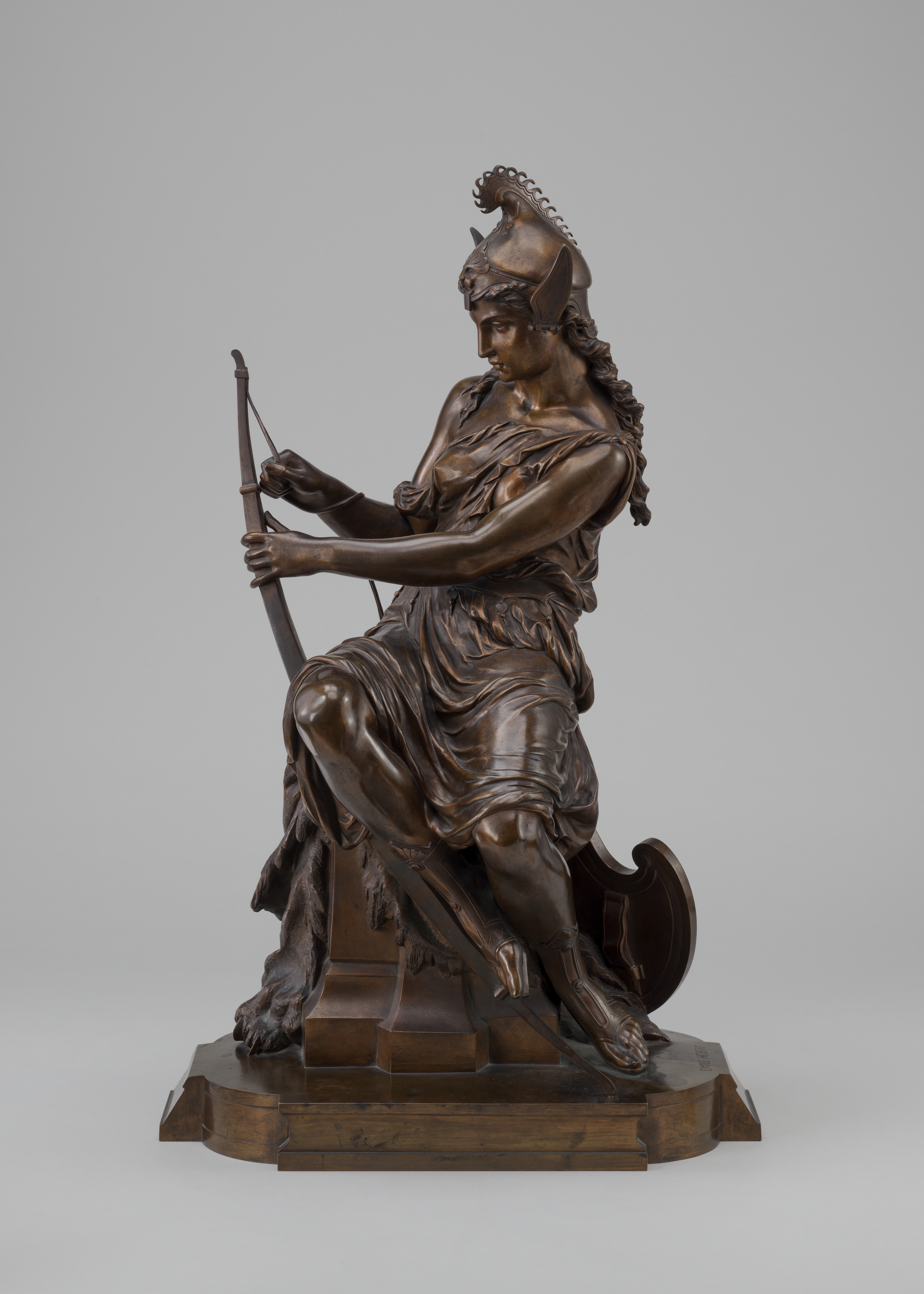
"Amazon preparing for battle" (Queen Antiope or Hippolyta) or "Armed Venus", by Pierre-Eugène-Emile Hébert, 1860, National Gallery of Art, Washington, D.C.

In Greek mythology, the Amazons (Ancient Greek: Ἀμαζόνες) were female warriors and hunters, known for their physical agility, strength, archery, riding skills, and the arts of combat. Their society was closed to men and they raised only their daughters, returning their sons to their fathers with whom they would only socialize briefly in order to reproduce. They were portrayed in a number of ancient epic poems and legends, such as the Labours of Heracles, the Argonautica and the Iliad.

Courageous and fiercely independent, the Amazons, commanded by their queen, regularly undertook extensive military expeditions into the far corners of the world, from Scythia to Thrace, Asia Minor, and the Aegean Islands, reaching as far as Arabia and Egypt. Besides military raids, the Amazons are also associated with the foundation of temples and the establishment of numerous ancient cities like Ephesos, Cyme, Smyrna, Sinope, Myrina, Magnesia, Pygela, etc.

The texts of the original myths envisioned the homeland of the Amazons at the periphery of the then-known world. Various claims to the exact place ranged from provinces in Asia Minor (Lycia, Caria, etc.) to the steppes around the Black Sea. However, authors most frequently referred to Pontus in northern Anatolia, on the southern shores of the Black Sea, as the independent Amazon kingdom where the Amazon queen resided at her capital Themiscyra, on the banks of the Thermodon river.

Decades of archaeological discoveries of burial sites of female warriors, including royalty, in the Eurasian Steppes suggest that the horse cultures of the Scythian and Sarmatian peoples likely inspired the Amazon myth. In 2019, a grave with multiple generations of female Scythian warriors, armed and in golden headdresses, was found near Voronezh in southwestern Russia. In 2017, another discovery was made in Armenia, where the grave of a woman buried with jewelry dating back to the Iron Age reflected injuries and musculature of a horse-back warrior who frequented battle.

== Name ==
=== Etymology ===
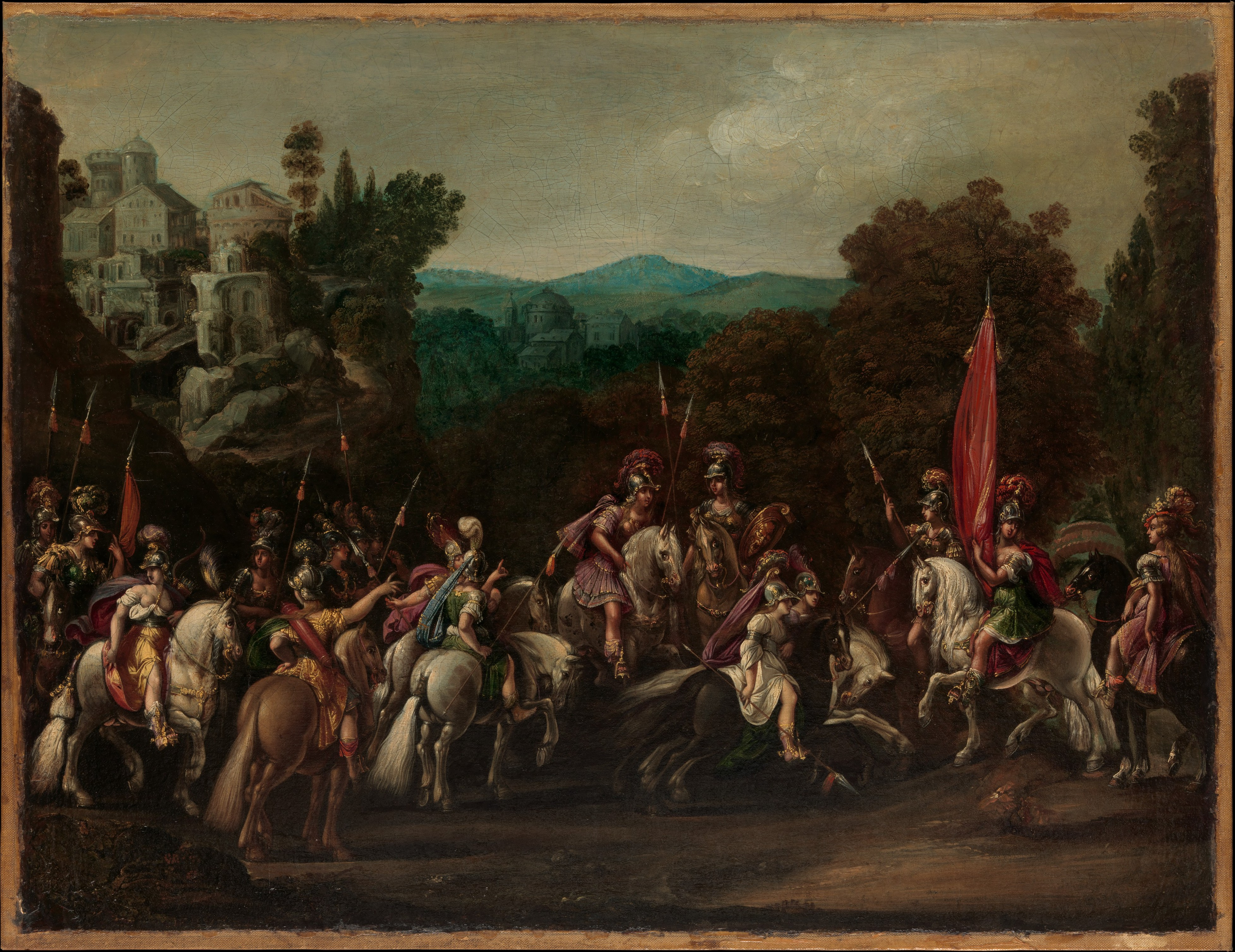
Departure of the Amazons, by Claude Deruet, 1620, Metropolitan Museum of Art, New York

The origin of the word is uncertain. It may be derived from an Iranian ethnonym *ha-mazan- 'warriors', a word attested indirectly through a derivation, a denominal verb in Hesychius of Alexandria's gloss "ἁμαζακάραν· πολεμεῖν. Πέρσαι" ("hamazakaran: 'to make war' in Persian"), where it appears together with the Indo-Iranian root *kar- 'make'.

It may alternatively be a Greek word descended from *n̥-mn̥gʷ-yō-nós 'man-/husband-less' (alpha privative combined with a derivation from *man- cognate with Proto-Balto-Slavic *mangjá-, found in Czech and South Slavic muž) has been proposed, an explanation deemed "unlikely" by Hjalmar Frisk. A further explanation proposes Iranian *ama-janah ('killers of manliness') as source.

Among the ancient Greeks, the term Amazon was popularly folk-etymologised as originating from the Greek ἀμαζός, amazos ('breastless'), from a- ('-less') and mazos, a variant of mastos ('breast'), connected with an etiological tradition once claimed by the Roman historian Mark Justin, who alleged that the Amazons had their right breast cut off or burnt out. There is no indication of such a practice in ancient works of art, in which the Amazons are always represented with both breasts, although one (often the right breast) would commonly be covered. According to Philostratus, the babies of Amazons were fed from both breasts, not only the left one. Author Adrienne Mayor suggests that the false etymology led to the myth.

=== Alternative terms ===
Herodotus used the terms Androktones (Ἀνδροκτόνες) 'manslayers' or 'mariticides', and Androleteirai (Ἀνδρολέτειραι) 'destroyers of men, murderesses'. Amazons are called Antianeirai (Ἀντιάνειραι) 'manlike', and Aeschylus used the term Styganor (Στυγάνωρ) 'men-loathers' (i.e., misandrists).

In his work Prometheus Bound and in The Suppliants, Aeschylus referred to the Amazons as 'the husbandless, flesh-devouring Amazons' (τὰς ἀνάνδρους κρεοβόρους τ᾽ Ἀμαζόνας; tas anandrous kreoborous t'Amazonas). In the Hippolytus tragedy, Phaedra calls Hippolytus, 'the son of the horse-loving Amazon' (τῆς φιλίππου παῖς Ἀμαζόνος βοᾷ Ἱππόλυτος; tis philippou pais Amazonos). In his Dionysiaca, Nonnus refers to Dionysos's Amazons as Androphonos (Ἀνδροφόνους), 'man-slaying'. Herodotus stated that, in the Scythian language, the Greek-named Amazons were known as Oiorpata (meaning likewise 'man-slaying'), a combination of the Scythian words oior ('man') and pata (a verb that meant 'to slay').

== Historiography ==
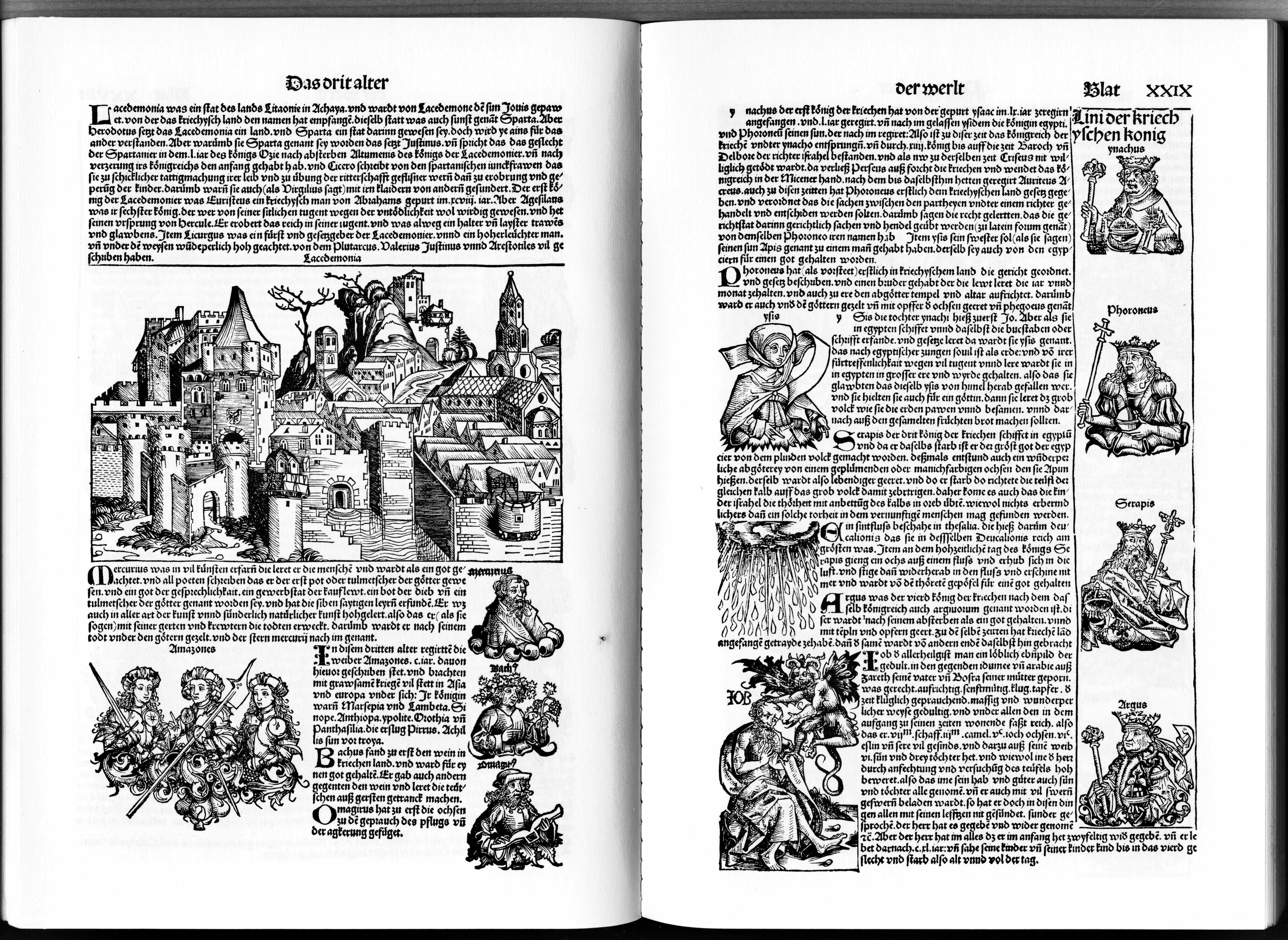
Amazons in the Nuremberg Chronicle by Hartmann Schedel, 1493

The ancient Greeks never had any doubts that the Amazons were, or had been, real. Greeks were not the only people enchanted by warlike women of nomadic cultures, such exciting tales also come from ancient Egypt, Persia, India, and China. Greek heroes of old had encounters with the queens of their martial society and fought them. However, their original home was not exactly known, thought to be in the obscure lands beyond the civilized world. As a result, many classical scholars consider Amazons to be entirely fictional figures, invented by Greek men to serve as "anti-women" or to symbolize Persians. Some authors preferred comparisons to cultures of Asia Minor or even Minoan Crete.

The most obvious historical candidates are Scythia (and more narrowly Sarmatia) in the Pontic–Caspian Steppe, and Lycia in Anatolia, in line with the accounts by Herodotus. In his Histories (5th century BCE), Herodotus claimed that the Sauromatae (predecessors of the Sarmatians), who ruled the lands between the Caspian Sea and the Black Sea, arose from a union of Scythians and Amazons. Herodotus also observed rather unusual customs among the Lycians of southwest Asia Minor. The Lycians followed matrilineal rules of descent, virtue, and status; they named themselves along their maternal family line and a child's status was determined by the mother's reputation. This remarkably high esteem of women and legal regulations based on maternal lines, still in effect in the 5th century BCE in the Lycian regions that Herodotus traveled to, suggested to him the idea that these people were descendants of the Amazons.

Modern historiography no longer relies exclusively on textual and artistic material, but also on the vast archaeological evidence of over a thousand nomad graves from steppe territories, from the Black Sea all the way to Mongolia. Discoveries of battle-scarred female skeletons buried with their weapons (bows and arrows, quivers, and spears) prove that women warriors were not merely figments of imagination, but the product of the horse-centered warrior lifestyle of Scytho-Sarmatians. However, it is not known for certain whether these people were the inspiration for the Amazons of Greek mythology.

== Mythology ==
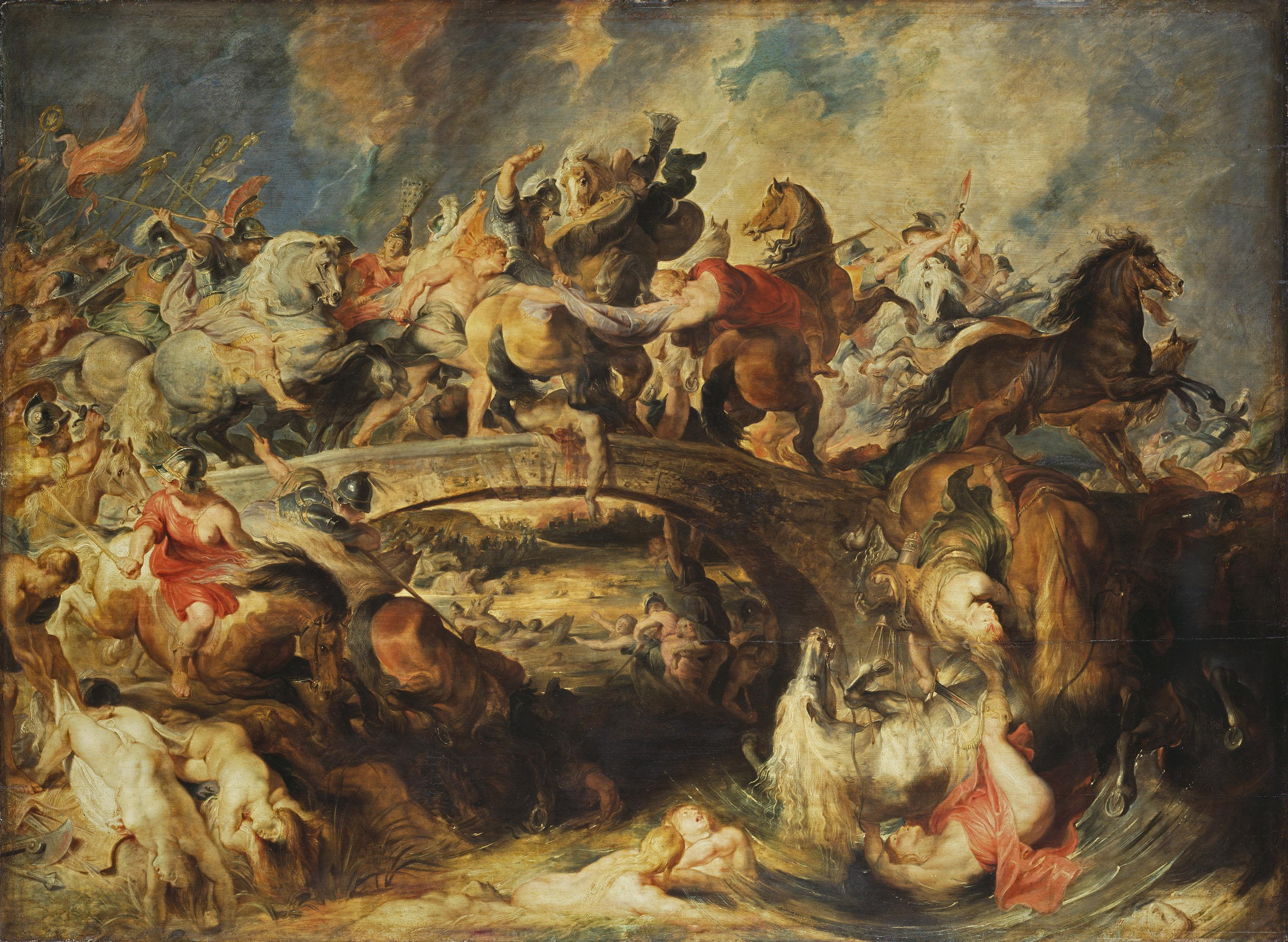
Battle of the Amazons, by Peter Paul Rubens, 1618, Alte Pinakothek, Munich

According to Apollonius of Rhodes the Amazons were the offspring of Ares, the god of war, and the nymph Harmonia of the Akmonian Wood.

Early records refer to two events in which Amazons appeared prior to the Trojan War (before 1250 BCE). Within the epic context, Bellerophon, Greek hero, and grandfather of the brothers and Trojan War veterans Glaukos and Sarpedon, faced Amazons during his stay in Lycia, when King Iobates sent Bellerophon to fight the Amazons, hoping they would kill him, yet Bellerophon slew them all. The youthful King Priam of Troy fought on the side of the Phrygians, who were attacked by Amazons at the Sangarios River.

=== Amazons in the Trojan War ===
There are Amazon characters in Homer's Trojan War epic poem, the Iliad, one of the oldest surviving texts in Europe (around 8th century BCE). The now lost epic Aethiopis (probably by Arctinus of Miletus, 6th century BCE), like the Iliad and several other epics, is one of the works that in combination form the Trojan War Epic Cycle. In one of the few references to the text, an Amazon force under queen Penthesilea, who was of Thracian birth, came to join the ranks of the Trojans after Hector's death and initially put the Greeks under serious pressure. Only after the greatest effort and the help of the reinvigorated hero Achilles, the Greeks eventually triumphed. Penthesilea died fighting the mighty Achilles in single combat. Homer himself deemed the Amazon myths to be common knowledge all over Greece, which suggests that they had already been known for some time before him. He was also convinced that the Amazons lived not at its fringes, but somewhere in or around Lycia in Asia Minor - a place well within the Greek world.

Troy is mentioned in the Iliad as the place of Myrine's death. Later identified as an Amazon queen, according to Diodorus (1st century BCE), the Amazons under her rule invaded the territories of the Atlantians, defeated the army of the Atlantian city of Cerne, and razed the city to the ground.

=== In Scythia ===
The Poet Bacchylides (6th century BCE) and the historian Herodotus (5th century BCE) located the Amazon homeland in Pontus at the southern shores of the Black Sea, and the capital Themiscyra at the banks of the Thermodon (modern Terme river), by the modern city of Terme. Herodotus also explains how it came to be that some Amazons would eventually be living in Scythia. A Greek fleet, sailing home upon defeating the Amazons in battle at the Thermodon river, included three ships crowded with Amazon prisoners. Once out at sea, the Amazon prisoners overwhelmed and killed the small crews of the prisoner ships and, despite not having even basic navigation skills, managed to escape and safely disembark at the Scythian shore. As soon as the Amazons had caught enough horses, they easily asserted themselves in the steppe in between the Caspian Sea and the Black Sea and, according to Herodotus, would eventually assimilate with the Scythians, whose descendants were the Sauromatae, the predecessors of the Sarmatians.

=== Amazon homeland ===
Strabo (1st century BCE) visits and confirms the original homeland of the Amazons on the plains by the Thermodon river. However, long gone and not seen again during his lifetime, the Amazons had allegedly retreated into the mountains. Strabo, however, added that other authors, among them Metrodorus of Scepsis and Hypsicrates claim that after abandoning Themiscyra, the Amazons had chosen to resettle beyond the borders of the Gargareans, an all-male tribe native to the northern foothills of the Caucasian Mountains. The Amazons and Gargareans had for many generations met in secrecy once a year during two months in spring, in order to produce children. These encounters would take place in accordance with ancient tribal customs and collective offers of sacrifices. All females were retained by the Amazons themselves, and males were returned to the Gargareans. 5th century BCE poet Magnes sings of the bravery of the Lydians in a cavalry-battle against the Amazons.

=== Heracles myth ===
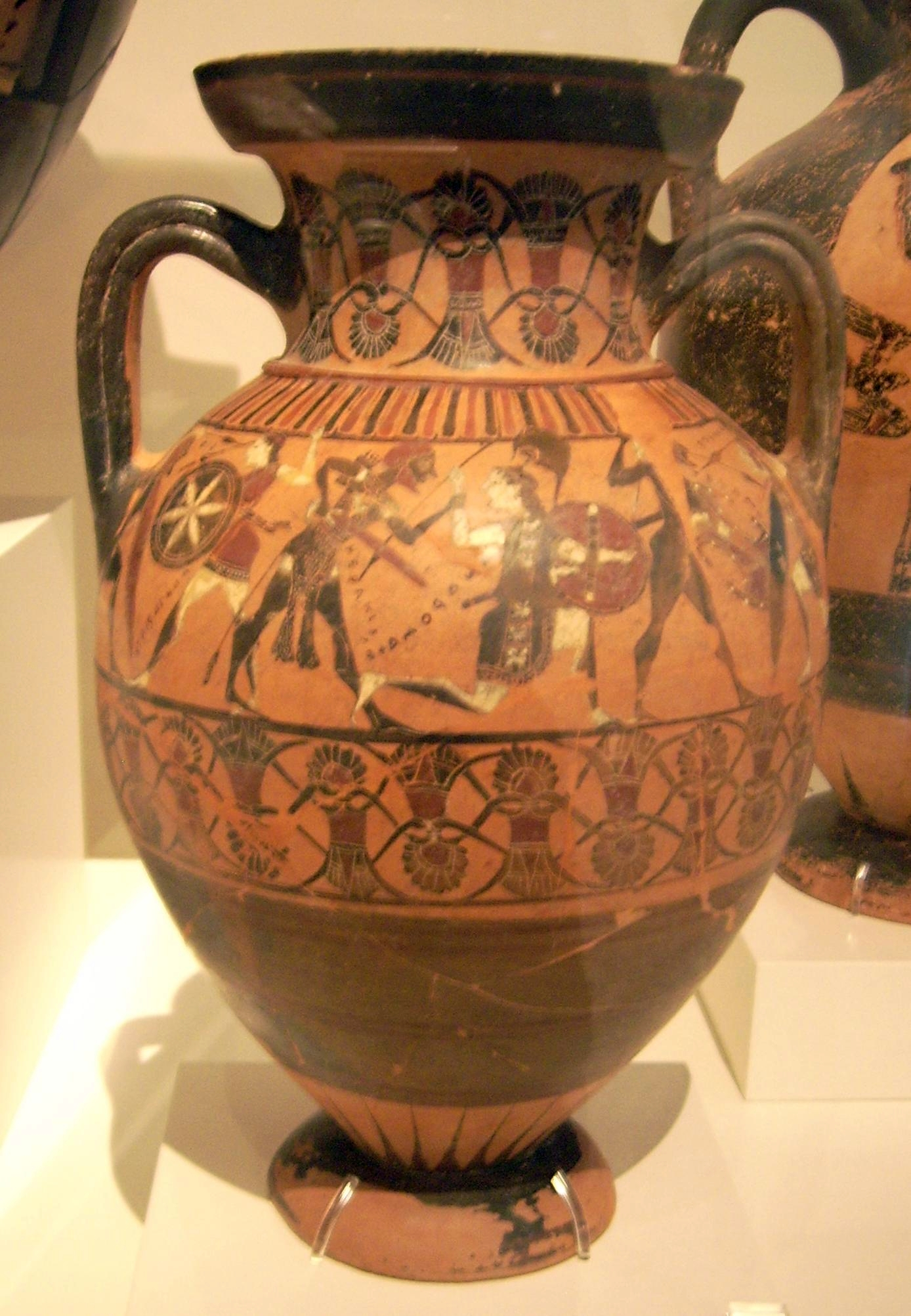
A Tyrrhenian amphora, depicting an Amazonomachy - Heracles fights Andromache, Telamon fights Ainipe and Iphis fights Panariste, c. 570 BCE, Museum of Fine Arts, Boston

Hippolyte was an Amazon queen killed by Heracles, who had set out to obtain the queen's magic belt in a task he was to accomplish as one of the Labours of Heracles. Although neither side had intended to resort to lethal combat, a misunderstanding led to the fight. In the course of this, Heracles killed the queen and several other Amazons. In awe of the strong hero, the Amazons eventually handed the belt to Heracles. In another version, Heracles does not kill the queen, but exchanges her kidnapped sister Melanippe for the belt.

=== Theseus myth ===
Queen Hippolyte was abducted by Theseus, who took her to Athens, where they got married and had a son, Hippolytus. In other versions, the kidnapped Amazon is called Antiope, the younger sister of Hippolyte and Penthesilea. In revenge, the Amazons invaded Greece, plundered some cities along the coast of Attica, and besieged and occupied Athens. Hippolyte, who fought on the side of Athens, according to another account was killed during the final battle along with all of the Amazons.

=== Amazons and Dionysus ===
According to Plutarch, the god Dionysus and his companions fought Amazons at Ephesus. The Amazons fled to Samos and Dionysus pursued them and killed a great number of them at a site since called Panaema (blood-soaked field). The Christian author Eusebius writes that during the reign of Oxyntes, one of the mythical kings of Athens, the Amazons burned down the temple at Ephesus.

In another myth Dionysus unites with the Amazons to fight against Cronus and the Titans. Polyaenus writes that after Dionysus has subdued the Indians, he allies with them and the Amazons and takes them into his service, who serve him in his campaign against the Bactrians. Nonnus in his Dionysiaca reports about the Amazons of Dionysus, but states that they do not come from Thermodon.

=== Amazons and Alexander the Great ===
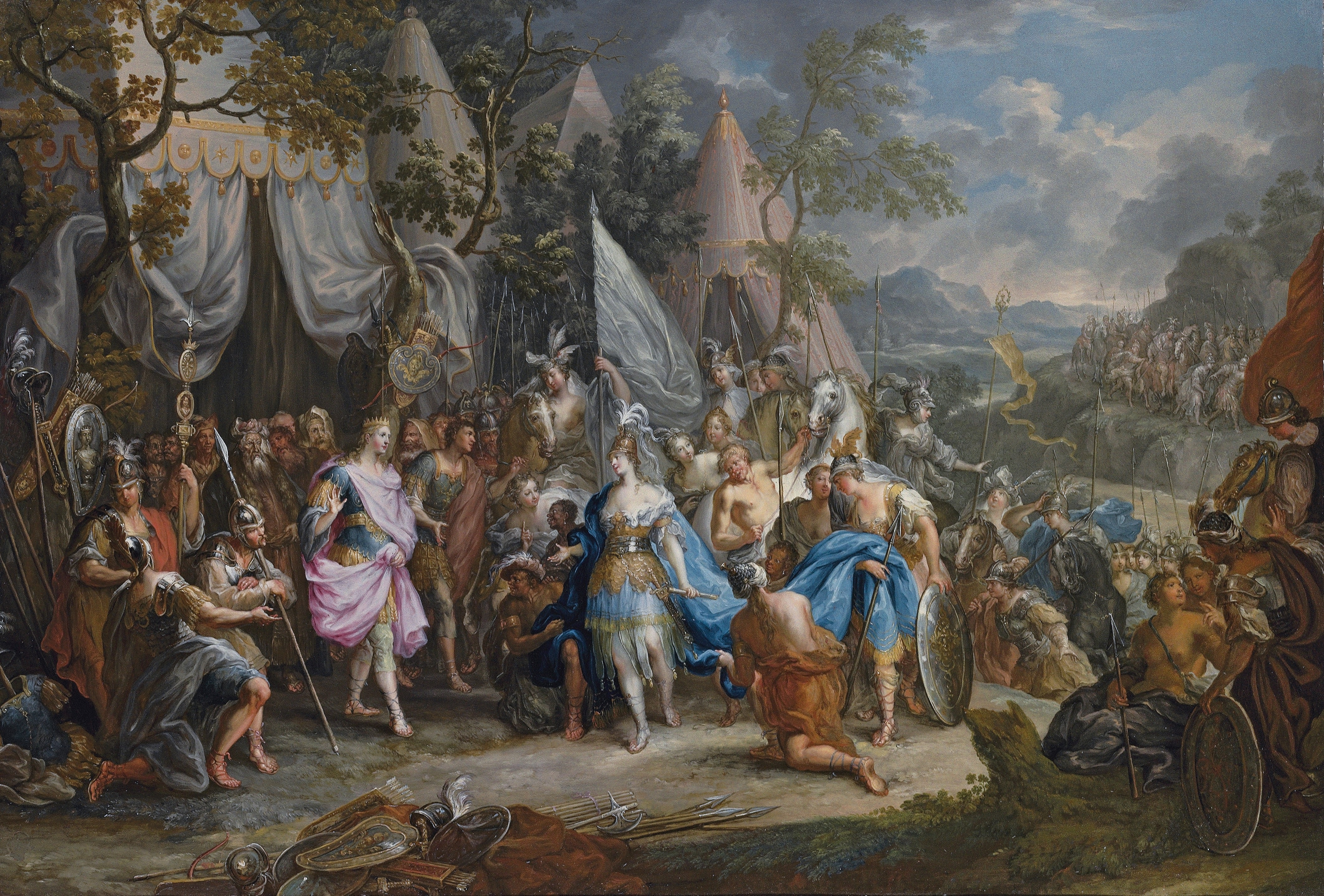
The Amazon Queen Thalestris in the camp of Alexander the Great, Johann Georg Platzer

Amazons are also mentioned by historians and biographers of Alexander the Great who reports Queen Thalestris's seeking him out in order to bear him a child. However, other biographers of Alexander, including Plutarch, dispute the claim. He noted a moment when Alexander's naval commander Onesicritus read an Amazon myth passage of his Alexander History to King Lysimachus of Thrace who had taken part in the original expedition. The king smiled at him and said: "And where was I, then?"

A story in the Alexander Romance involves his conquest of the Amazons, carried out mainly by an exchange of threatening letters.

The Talmud recounts that Alexander wanted to conquer a "kingdom of women" but reconsidered when the women told him:

If you kill us, people will say: Alexander kills women; and if we kill you, people will say: Alexander is the king whom women killed in battle.

=== Roman and ancient Egyptian records ===
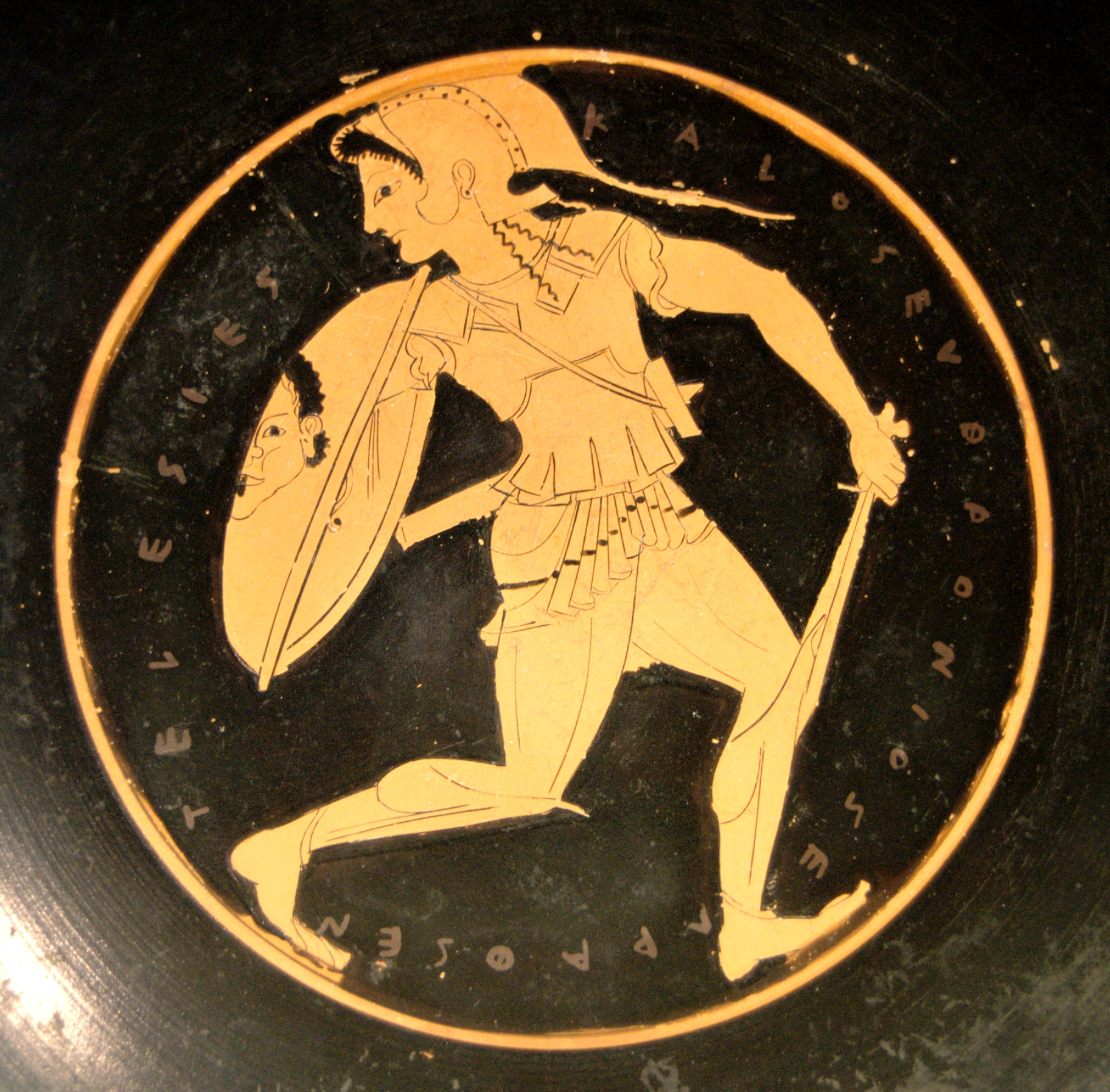
Armed Amazon, with a Gorgon head decorating her shield; Tondo of Attic red-figure kylix, c. 500 BCE, Staatliche Antikensammlungen, Berlin.

Virgil's characterization of the Volsci warrior maiden Camilla in the Aeneid borrows from the myths of the Amazons. Philostratus, in Heroica, writes that the Mysian women fought on horses alongside the men, just as the Amazons. The leader was Hiera, wife of Telephus. The Amazons are also said to have undertaken an expedition against the Island of Leuke, at the mouth of the Danube, where the ashes of Achilles were deposited by Thetis. The ghost of the dead hero so terrified the horses, that they threw off and trampled upon the invaders, who were forced to retreat.

The biographer Suetonius had Julius Caesar remark in his De vita Caesarum that the Amazons once ruled a large part of Asia. Appian provides a vivid description of Themiscyra and its fortifications in his account of Lucius Licinius Lucullus's Siege of Themiscyra in 71 BCE during the Third Mithridatic War.

An Amazon myth has been partly preserved in two badly fragmented versions around historical people in 7th century BCE Egypt. The Egyptian prince Petechonsis and allied Assyrian troops undertook a joint campaign into the Land of Women, to the Middle East at the border to India. Petechonsis initially fought the Amazons, but soon fell in love with their queen Sarpot and eventually allied with her against an invading Indian army. This story is said to have originated in Egypt independently of Greek influences.

=== Amazon queens ===
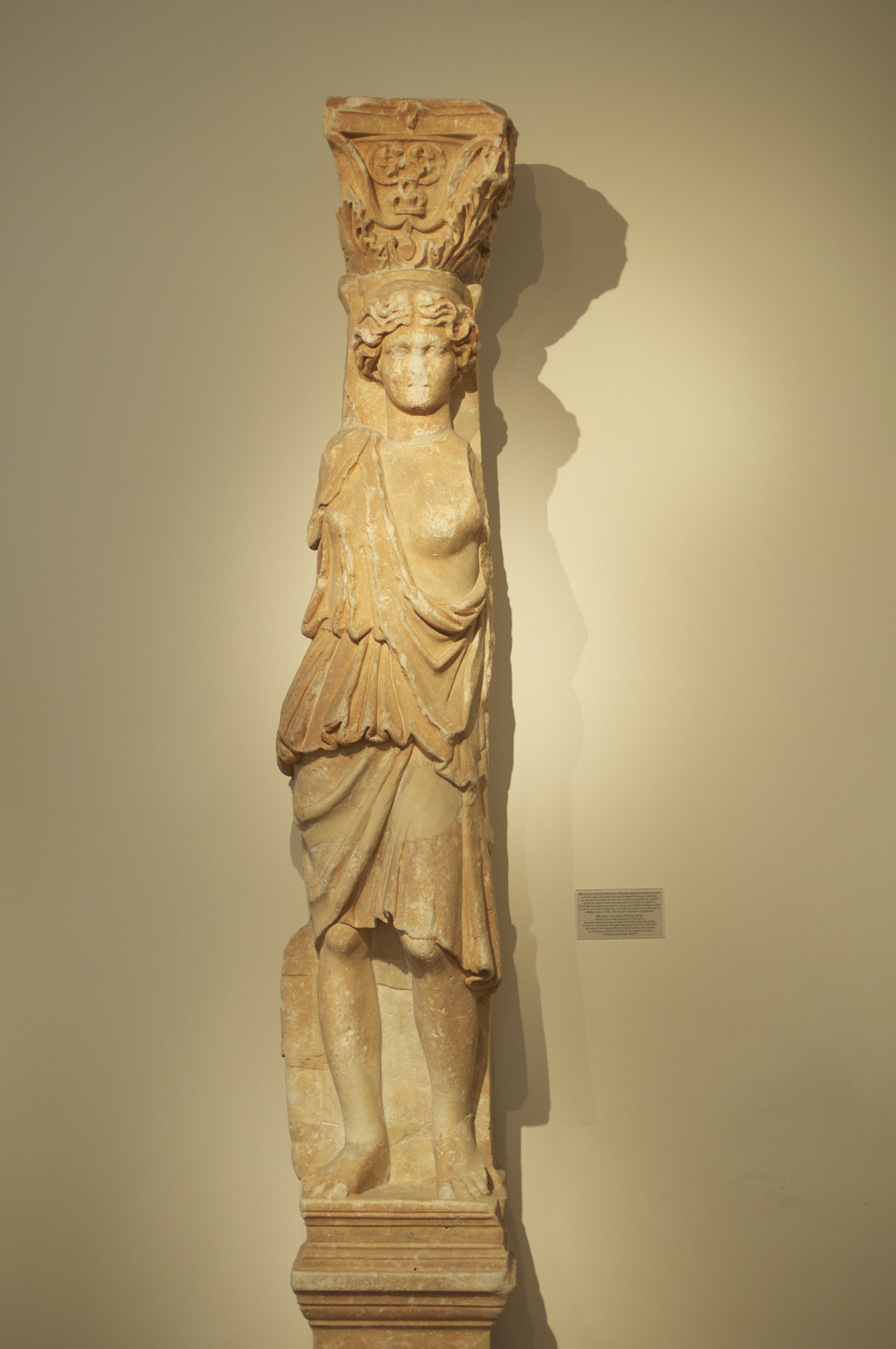
Caryatid Amazon from the Villa of Herodes Atticus, 2nd century CE, National Archaeological Museum, Athens

Sources provide names of individual Amazons, who are referred to as queens of their people, even as the head of a dynasty. Without a male companion, they are portrayed in command of their female warriors. Among the most prominent Amazon queens were:

- Otrera, daughter of the nymph Harmonia and god of war, Ares. She is the mother of Hippolyta, Antiope, Melanippe, and Penthesilea and the mythical founder of the Temple of Artemis in Ephesus.
- Hippolyta, daughter of Otrera and Ares. She is part of the Theseus and Heracles myths, in which Antiope is her sister. Alcippe, the only Amazon known to have sworn a chastity oath, belongs to her entourage.
- Penthesilea, who kills her sister Hippolyte in a hunting accident, comes to the aid of the hard-pressed Trojans with her warriors, is defeated by Achilles, who mourns her.
- Lampedo and Marpesia, queens of the Amazons mentioned by Justin
- Orithyia, daughter of Marpesia. Aligned with Sagillus, the king of Scythia due to the kidnapping of her sister, Antiope.
- Myrina, who leads a military expedition in Libya, defeats the Atlanteans, forms an alliance with the ruler of Egypt, and conquers numerous cities and islands.
- Thalestris, the last known Amazon queen. According to legend, she meets the Greek conqueror Alexander the Great in 330 BCE. Her home is the Thermodon region, or, variably, the Gates of Alexander, south of the Caspian Sea.

== Various authors and chroniclers ==
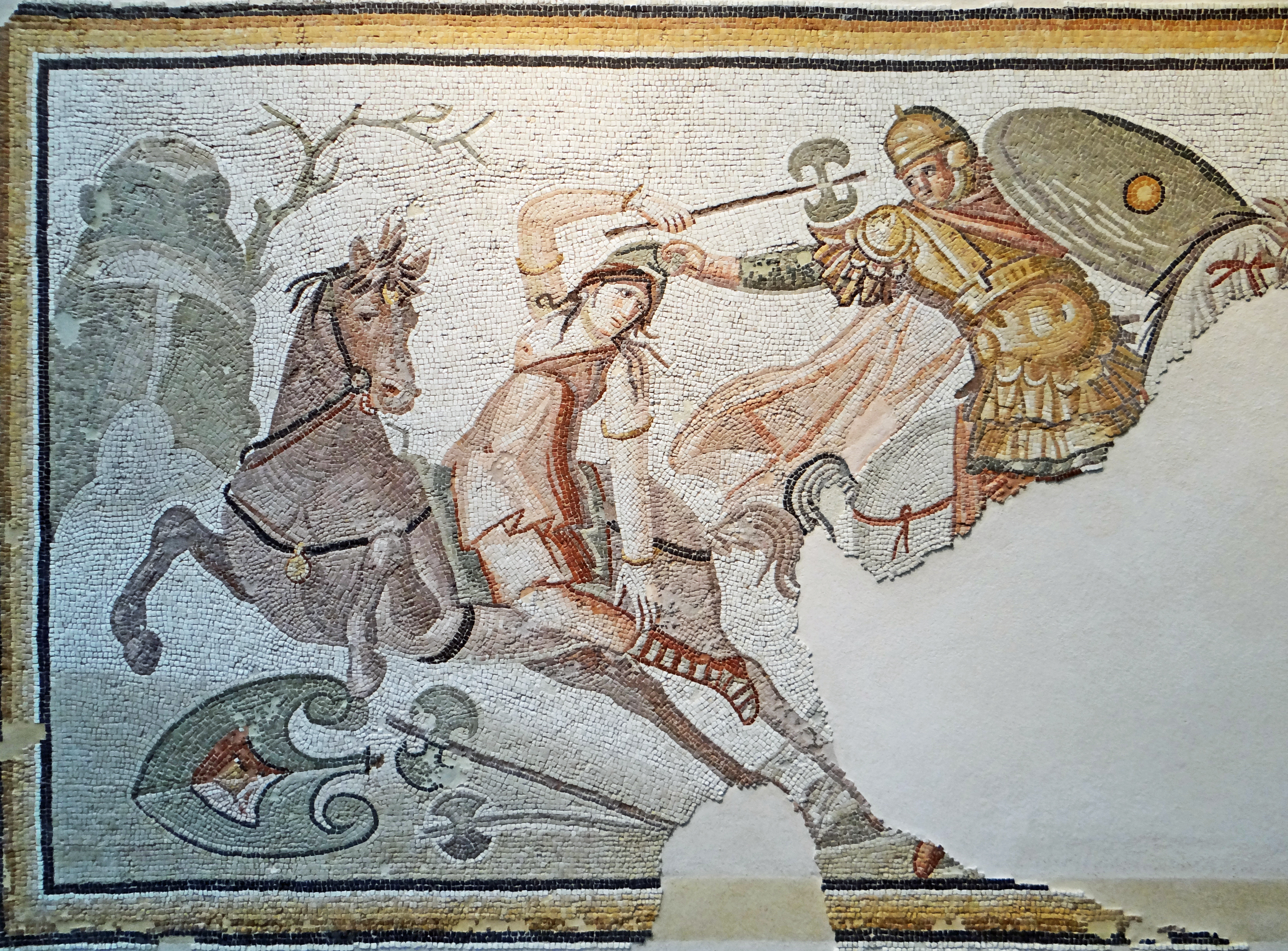
A hippeis rider seizes a mounted Amazonian warrior armed with a labrys by her Phrygian cap. Roman mosaic emblema (marble and limestone) from Daphne, a suburb of Antioch-on-the-Orontes (now Antakya in Turkey), second half of the 4th century CE, the Louvre, Paris.

=== Quintus Smyrnaeus ===
Quintus Smyrnaeus, author of the Posthomerica lists the attendant warriors of Penthesilea: "Clonie was there, Polemusa, Derinoe, Evandre, and Antandre, and Bremusa, Hippothoe, dark-eyed Harmothoe, Alcibie, Derimacheia, Antibrote, and Thermodosa glorying with the spear."

=== Diodorus Siculus ===
Diodorus Siculus lists twelve Amazons who challenged and died fighting Heracles during his quest for Hippolyta's girdle: Aella, Philippis, Prothoe, Eriboea, Celaeno, Eurybia, Phoebe, Deianeira, Asteria, Marpe, Tecmessa, and Alcippe. After Alcippe's death, a group attack followed. Diodorus also mentions Melanippe, whom Heracles set free after accepting her girdle and Antiope as ransom.

Diodorus lists another group with Myrina as the queen who commanded the Amazons in a military expedition in Libya, as well as her sister Mytilene, after whom she named the city of the same name. Myrina also named three more cities after the Amazons who held the most important commands under her, Cyme, Pitane, and Priene.

=== Justin and Paulus Orosius ===
Both Justin in his Epitome of Trogus Pompeius and Paulus Orosius give an account of the Amazons, citing the same names. Queens Marpesia and Lampedo shared the power during an incursion in Europe and Asia, where they were slain. Marpesia's daughter Orithyia succeeded them and was greatly admired for her skill on war. She shared power with her sister Antiope, but she was engaged in war abroad when Heracles attacked. Two of Antiope's sisters were taken prisoner, Melanippe by Heracles and Hippolyta by Theseus. Heracles latter restored Melanippe to her sister after receiving the queen's arms in exchange, though, on other accounts she was killed by Telamon. They also mention Penthesilea's role in the Trojan War.

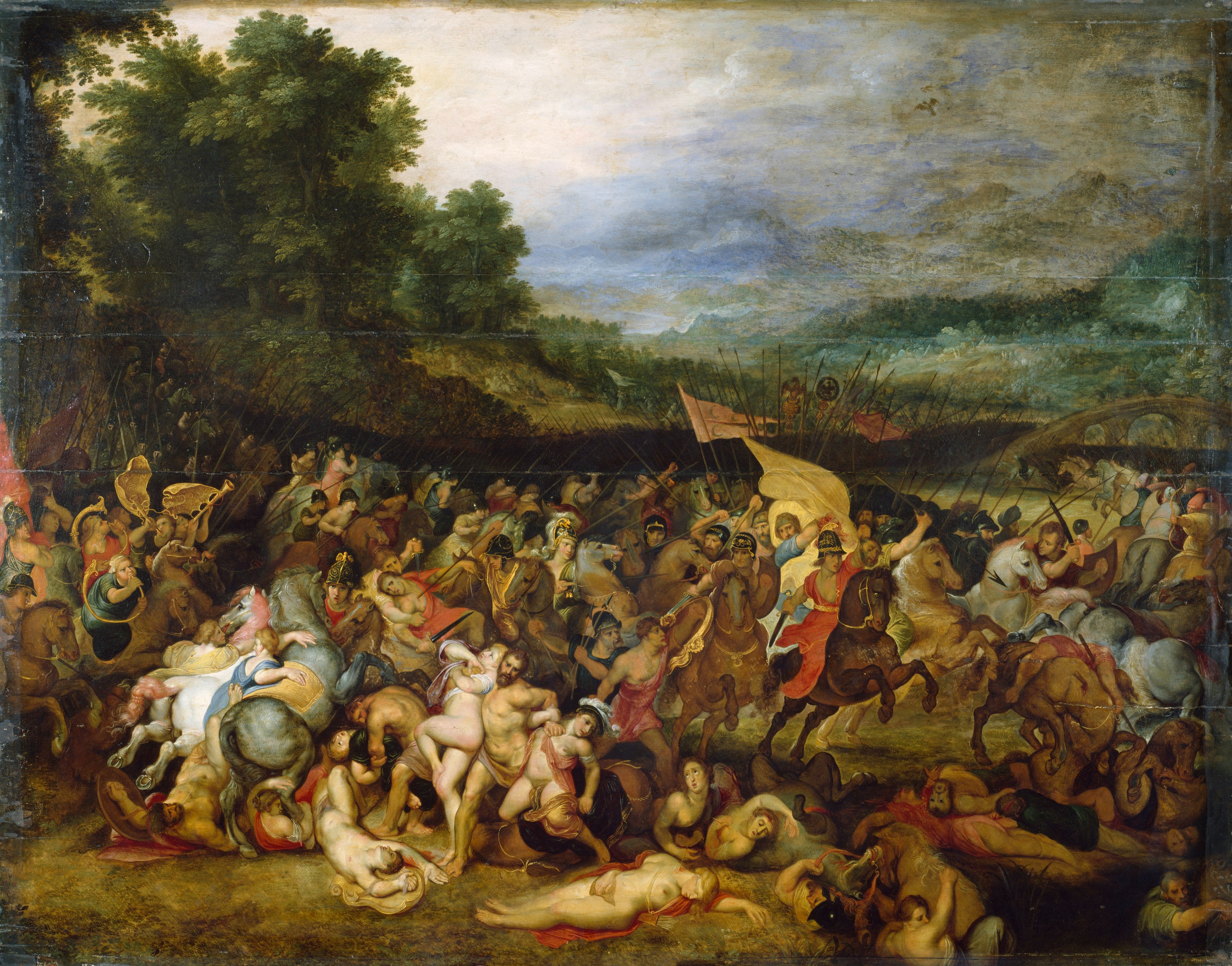
Battle of the Amazons by Rubens and Jan Brueghel, c. 1600, Sanssouci Picture Gallery, Potsdam

=== Hyginus ===
Another list of Amazons' names is found in Hyginus's Fabulae. Along with Hippolyta, Otrera, Antioche and Penthesilea, it attests the following names: Ocyale, Dioxippe, Iphinome, Xanthe, Hippothoe, Laomache, Glauce, Agave, Theseis, Clymene and Polydora.

Perhaps the most important is Queen Otrera, consort of Ares and mother by him of Hippolyta and Penthesilea. She is also known for building a temple to Artemis at Ephesus.

=== Valerius Flaccus ===
Another different set of names is found in Valerius Flaccus's Argonautica. He mentions Euryale, Harpe, Lyce, Menippe and Thoe. Of these Lyce also appears on a fragment, preserved in the Latin Anthology where she is said to have killed the hero Clonus of Moesia, son of Doryclus, with her javelin.

=== Palaephatus ===
Palaephatus, who himself might have been a fictional character, attempted to rationalize the Greek myths in his work On Unbelievable Tales. He suspected that the Amazons were probably men who were mistaken for women by their enemies because they wore clothing that reached their feet, tied up their hair in headbands, and shaved their beards. Probably the first in a long line of skeptics, he rejected any real basis for them, reasoning that because they did not exist during his time, most probably they did not exist in the past either. He himself contradicted this in his rationalizing of Oedipus and the Sphinx, portraying the latter as an Amazon woman named "Sphinx."

== Late Antiquity, Middle Ages, and Renaissance literature ==
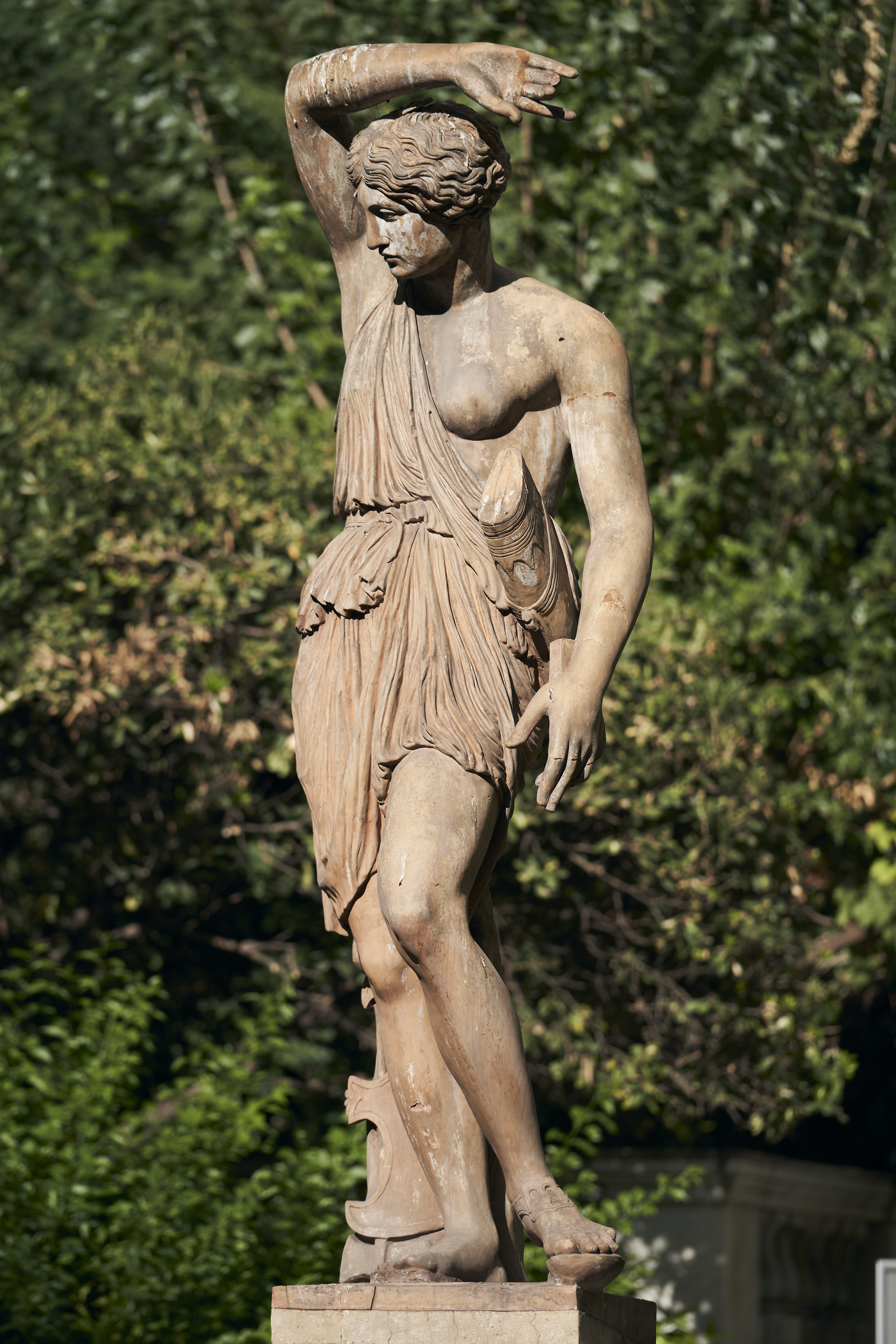
Clay statue of a Mattei-type Amazon, Numismatic Museum of Athens, Greece.

Stephanus of Byzantium (7th-century CE) provides numerous alternative lists of the Amazons, including for those who died in combat against Heracles, describing them as the "most prominent of their people". Both Stephanus and Eustathius connect these Amazons with the placename "Thibais", which they claim to have been derived from the Amazon Thiba's name. Several of Stephanus's Amazons served as eponyms for cities in Asia Minor, like Cyme and Smyrna or Amastris, who was believed to lend her name to the city previously known as Kromna, although in fact it was named after the historical Amastris. The city Anaea in Caria was named after an Amazon.

In his work Getica (on the origin and history of the Goths, c. 551 CE), Jordanes asserts that the Goths' ancestors, descendants of Magog, originally lived in Scythia, at the Sea of Azov between the Dnieper and Don Rivers. When the Goths were abroad campaigning against Pharaoh Vesosis, their women, on their own successfully fended off a raid by a neighboring tribe. Emboldened, the women established their own army under Marpesia, crossed the Don and invaded eastward into Asia. Marpesia's sister Lampedo remained in Europe to guard the homeland. They procreated with men once a year. These women conquered Armenia, Syria, and all of Asia Minor, even reaching Ionia and Aeolis, holding this vast territory for 100 years.

In Digenes Akritas, the twelfth century medieval epic of Basil, the Greco-Syrian knight of the Byzantine frontier, the hero battles and then commits adultery with the female warrior Maximo (killing her afterwards in one version of the epic), descended from some Amazons and taken by Alexander from the Brahmans.

John Tzetzes lists in Posthomerica twenty Amazons who fell at Troy. This list is unique in its attestation for all the names but Antianeira, Andromache, and Hippothoe. Other than these three, the remaining 17 Amazons were named as Toxophone, Toxoanassa, Gortyessa, Iodoce, Pharetre, Andro, Ioxeia, Oistrophe, Androdaixa, Aspidocharme, Enchesimargos, Cnemis, Thorece, Chalcaor, Eurylophe, Hecate, and Anchimache.

Famous medieval traveller John Mandeville mentions them in his book:

Beside the land of Chaldea is the land of Amazonia, that is the land of Feminye. And in that realm is all woman and no man; not as some may say, that men may not live there, but for because that the women will not suffer no men amongst them to be their sovereigns.

Medieval and Renaissance authors credit the Amazons with the invention of the battle-axe. This is probably related to the sagaris, an axe-like weapon associated with both Amazons and Scythian tribes by Greek authors (see also Thracian tomb of Aleksandrovo kurgan). Paulus Hector Mair expresses astonishment that such a "manly weapon" should have been invented by a "tribe of women", but he accepts the attribution out of respect for his authority, Johannes Aventinus.

Ariosto's Orlando Furioso contains a country of warrior women, ruled by Queen Orontea; the epic describes an origin much like that in Greek myth, in that the women, abandoned by a band of warriors and unfaithful lovers, rallied together to form a nation from which men were severely reduced, to prevent them from regaining power. The Amazons and Queen Hippolyta are also referenced in Geoffrey Chaucer's Canterbury Tales in "The Knight's Tale".

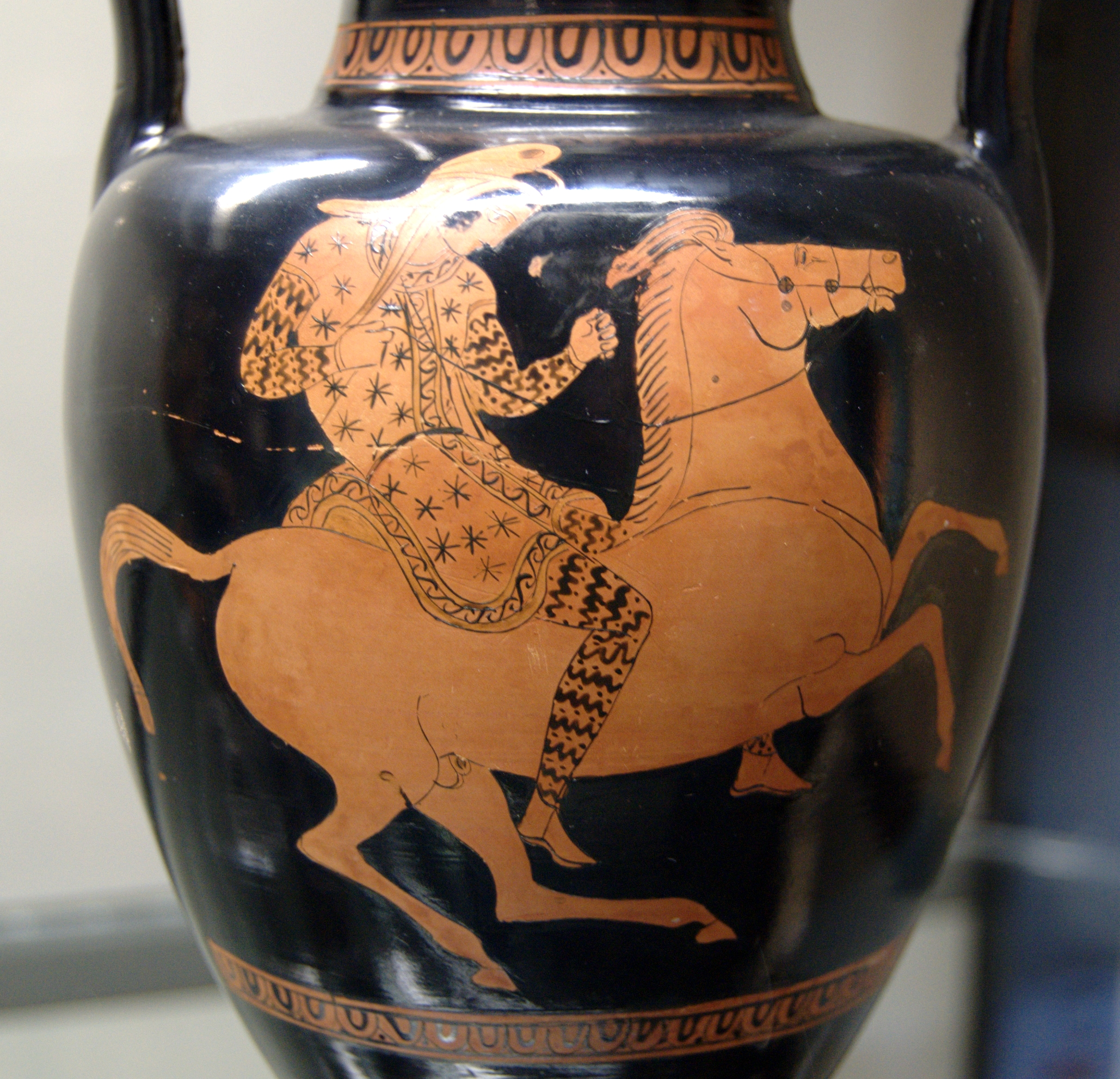
Amazon in Scythian attire, Attic vase, c. 420 BCE, Staatliche Antikensammlungen, Munich

Amazons continued to be subject of scholarly debate during the European Renaissance, and with the onset of the Age of Exploration, encounters were reported from ever more distant lands. In 1542, Francisco de Orellana reached the Amazon River, naming it after the Icamiabas, a tribe of warlike women he claimed to have encountered and fought on the Nhamundá River, a tributary of the Amazon. Afterwards the whole basin and region of the Amazon (Amazônia in Portuguese, Amazonía in Spanish) were named after the river. Amazons also figure in the accounts of both Christopher Columbus and Walter Raleigh.

== Amazons in art ==
Beginning around 550 BCE. depictions of Amazons as daring fighters and equestrian warriors appeared on vases. After the Battle of Marathon in 490 BCE the Amazon battle - Amazonomachy became popular motifs on pottery. By the sixth century BCE, public and privately displayed artwork used the Amazon imagery for pediment reliefs, sarcophagi, mosaics, pottery, jewelry and even monumental sculptures, that adorned important buildings like the Parthenon in Athens. Amazon motifs remained popular until the Roman imperial period and into Late antiquity.

Apart from the artistic desire to express the passionate womanhood of the Amazons in contrast with the manhood of their enemies, some modern historians interpret the popularity of Amazon in art as indicators of societal trends, both positive and negative. Greek and Roman societies, however, utilized the Amazon mythology as a literary and artistic vehicle to unite against a commonly held enemy. The metaphysical characteristics of Amazons were seen as personifications of both nature and religion. Roman authors like Virgil, Strabo, Pliny the Elder, Curtius, Plutarch, Arrian, and Pausanias advocated the greatness of the state, as Amazon myths served to discuss the creation of origin and identity for the Roman people. However, that changed over time. Amazons in Roman literature and art have many faces, such as the Trojan ally, the warrior goddess, the native Latin, the warmongering Celt, the proud Sarmatian, the hedonistic and passionate Thracian warrior queen, the subdued Asian city, and the worthy Roman foe.

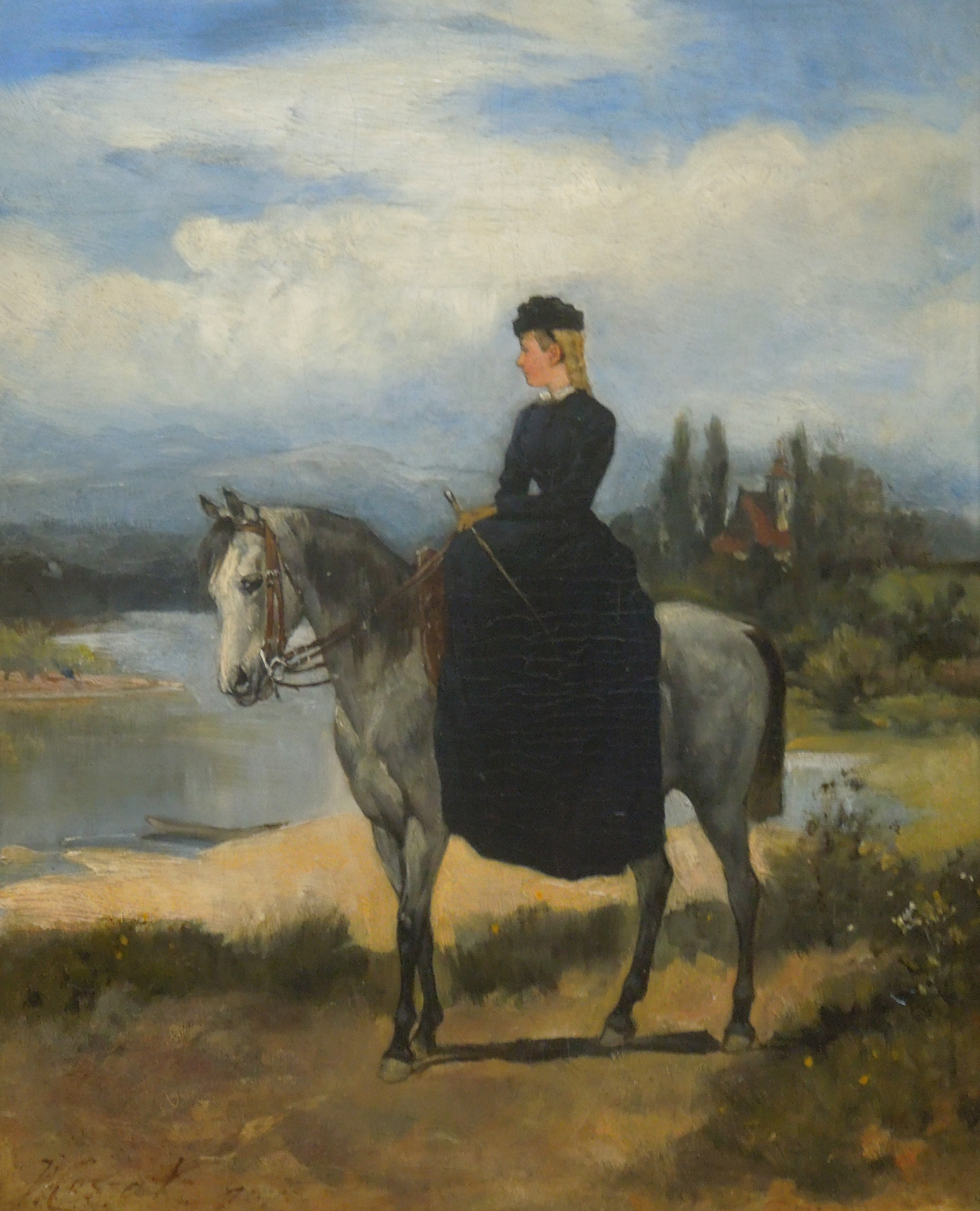
Juliusz Kossak, An Amazon, 1878

In Renaissance Europe, artists started to reevaluate and depict Amazons based on Christian ethics. Queen Elizabeth of England was associated with Amazon warrior qualities (the foremost ancient examples of feminism) during her reign and was indeed depicted as such. Though, as explained in Divina Virago by Winfried Schleiner, Celeste T. Wright has given a detailed account of the bad reputation Amazons had in the Renaissance. She notes that she has not found any Elizabethans comparing the Queen to an Amazon and suggests that they might have hesitated to do so because of the association of Amazons with enfranchisement of women, which was considered contemptible. Elizabeth was present at a tournament celebrating the marriage of the Earl of Warwick and Anne Russell at Westminster Palace on November 11, 1565, involving male riders dressed as Amazons. They accompanied the challengers carrying their heraldry. These riders wore crimson gowns, masks with long hair attached, and swords.

Peter Paul Rubens and Jan Brueghel depicted the Battle of the Amazons around 1598, a most dramatic baroque painting, followed by a painting of the Rococo period by Johann Georg Platzer, also titled Battle of the Amazons. In 19th-century European Romanticism German artist Anselm Feuerbach occupied himself with the Amazons as well. Of Faeurbach's painting, Gert Schiff wrote that:

It engendered all the aspirations of the Romantics: their desire to transcend the boundaries of the ego and of the known world; their interest in the occult in nature and in the soul; their search for a national identity, and the ensuing search for the mythic origins of the Germanic nation; finally, their wish to escape the harsh realities of the present through immersion in an idealized past.

== Maps ==
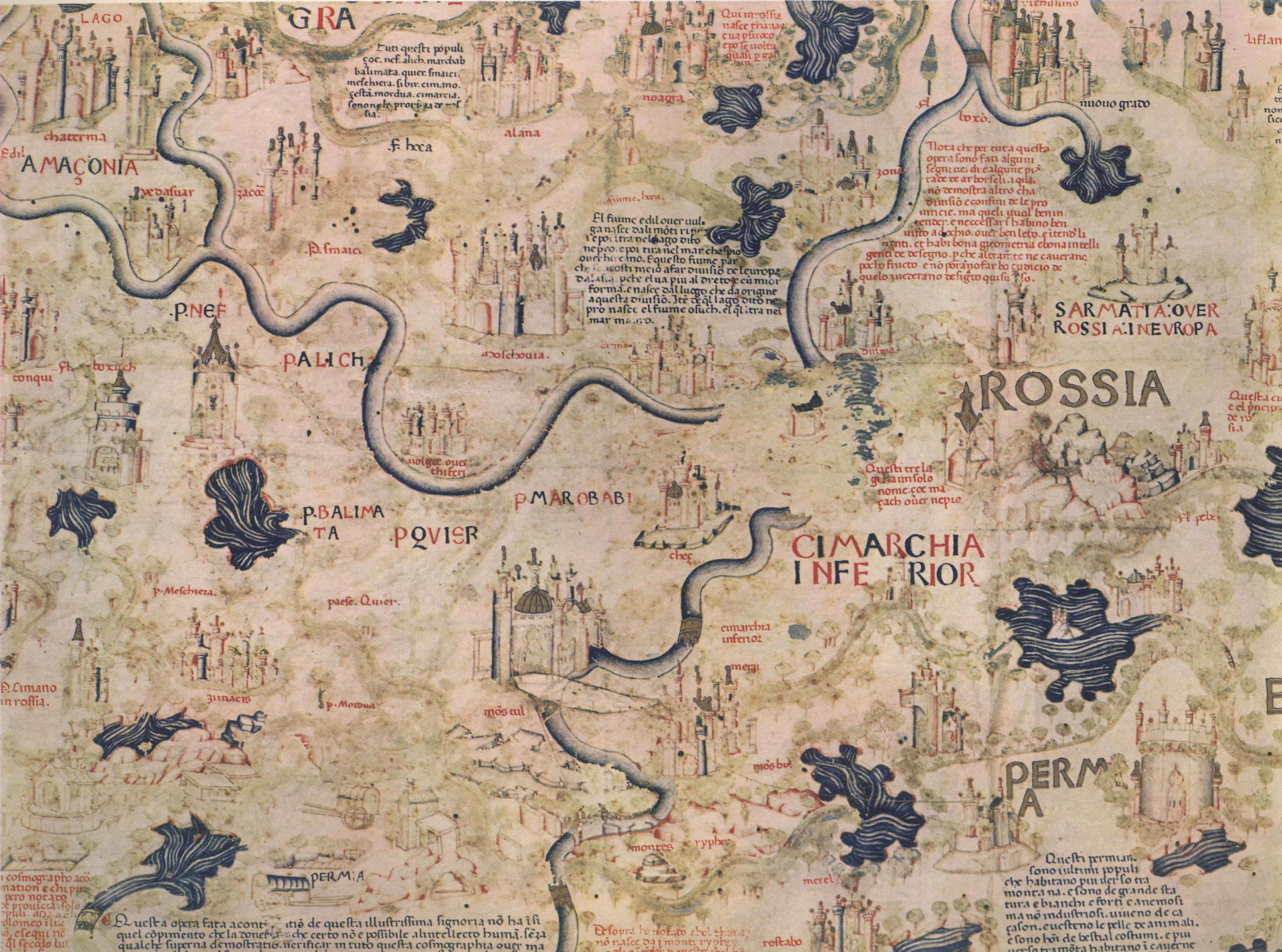
Fra Mauro map (XL) with location Ancient Greek: Ἀμαζόnia, romanized: Amazonia placed on the Middle Volga

The medieval Borgia Velletri map pictures females with bow and arrow and others with spear and shield, with the description "The land formerly of illustrious women", at the north (on the bottom) of Edilus fluuius maximus (the Volga river).

In the medieval Fra Mauro map, a land called Ancient Greek: Ἀμαζόnia, romanized: Amazonia is placed on the Middle Volga region.

== Archaeology ==
Speculation that the idea of Amazons, specifically the Amazons known to the Greeks, contains a core of reality is based on archaeological discoveries at kurgan burial sites in the steppes of southern Ukraine and Russia. The varied weapon artifacts found in graves of numerous high-ranking Scythian and Sarmatian warrior women have led scholars to conclude that the Amazonian legend has been inspired by the real world: About 20% of the warrior graves on the lower Don and lower Volga contained women dressed for battle similar to how men dressed. Armed women accounted for up to 25% of Sarmatian military burials. Russian archaeologist Vera Kovalevskaya asserts that when Scythian men were abroad fighting or hunting, women would have to be able to competently defend themselves, their animals, and their pastures. A 2024 report in The Observer described Bronze Age graves in Nakhchivan, Azerbaijan, where women were found buried with weapons including arrowheads, a bronze dagger, and a mace, presenting the finds as part of a broader pattern of female warrior burials in the Caucasus and Eurasian steppe.

In early 20th century Minoan archeology, a theory regarding Amazon origins in Minoan civilization was raised in an essay by Lewis Richard Farnell and John Myres. According to Myres, the tradition interpreted in the light of evidence furnished by supposed Amazon cults seems to have been very similar and may have even originated in Minoan culture.

== Modern legacy ==
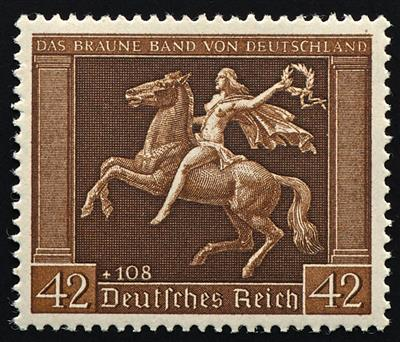
Amazon on a special stamp promoting the 1938 German "Brown Ribbon" horse races

The city of Samsun in modern-day Samsun Province, Turkey features an Amazon Village museum, to help bring attention to the legacy of the Amazons and to promote both academic interest and tourism. The Amazon warriors have been seen as a symbol of empowerment for feminist movements. The legacy has empowered and encouraged other women to build their strength and stand against societal norms. They have inspired countless amounts of women to stand up for themselves and what they believe. An annual Amazon Celebration Festival takes place in the Terme district.

During the Ottoman–Egyptian invasion of Mani in 1826, in the battle of Diros, the women of Mani defeated the Ottoman army and for this were given the name of 'The Amazons of Diros'.

From 1936 to 1939, annual propaganda events, called Night of the Amazons (Nacht der Amazonen) were performed in Nazi Germany at the Nymphenburg Palace Park in Munich. At one such open-air event, announced as evening highlights of the International Horse Racing Week of Munich-Riem, bare-breasted variety show girls, the SS Cavalry, and international guests performed, with 2,500 total participants. These revues served to promote an allegedly emancipated female role and a cosmopolitan and foreigner-friendly Nazi regime.

=== In literature and media ===
==== Literature and comics ====
- Amazon Queen Hippolyta appears in William Shakespeare's play A Midsummer Night's Dream and also in The Two Noble Kinsmen, which Shakespeare co-wrote with John Fletcher.
- The Amazon queen Penthesilea, and her sexual frenzy, are at the center of the drama Penthesilea by Heinrich von Kleist in 1808.
- Steven Pressfield's 2002 novel Last of the Amazons is a mythopoeia of Plutarch's texts, that surround Theseus's abduction of Queen Antiope and the Amazons' attack on Athens. An accurate and detailed though dramatized portrayal of the Archaic Greek world, its life, people, weapons, etc.
- William Moulton Marston, alongside his wife Elizabeth Holloway and their lover Olive Byrne, created their rendition of the mythical Amazons, whose members included the superheroine Wonder Woman, for DC Comics. Marston's Amazons are noteworthy for not just being physically superior to mortal men but also technologically superior, being able to create healing rays and undetectable jet planes that can be controlled through brain waves alone, although this element of Amazon society is applied inconsistently in appearances written after Marston's death.
- In Rick Riordan's The Heroes of Olympus, the Amazons appear in The Son of Neptune and The Blood of Olympus. They are the founders and owners of the Amazon corporation.

==== Film and television ====
- The postscript for the 1980 film 9 to 5 mentioned that Franklin Hart was abducted by a tribe of Amazons when helping Consolidated Companies' chairman of the board Russell Tinsworthy with a project in the Brazilian jungle.
- Amazons appear in the movies The Loves of Hercules (1960), Battle of the Amazons (1970), War Goddess (1973), Hundra (1983), Amazons (1986), Deathstalker II (1987), Ronal the Barbarian (2011), Hercules (2014) and DC Extended Universe films: Wonder Woman (2017), Justice League (2017), Wonder Woman 1984 (2020), Zack Snyder's Justice League (2021).
- Amazons in television series Hercules: The Legendary Journeys, Young Hercules, Kaos, Xena: Warrior Princess, The Legend of the Hidden City, Huntik: Secrets & Seekers and Supernatural.

==== Games ====
Amazons are featured in the following roleplay - and video games: Diablo, Heroes Unlimited, Aliens Unlimited, Amazon: Guardians of Eden, Flight of the Amazon Queen, A Total War Saga: Troy, Rome: Total War, Final Fantasy IV, Age of Wonders: Planetfall, Legend of Zelda series and Yu-Gi-Oh games.

=== Military units ===
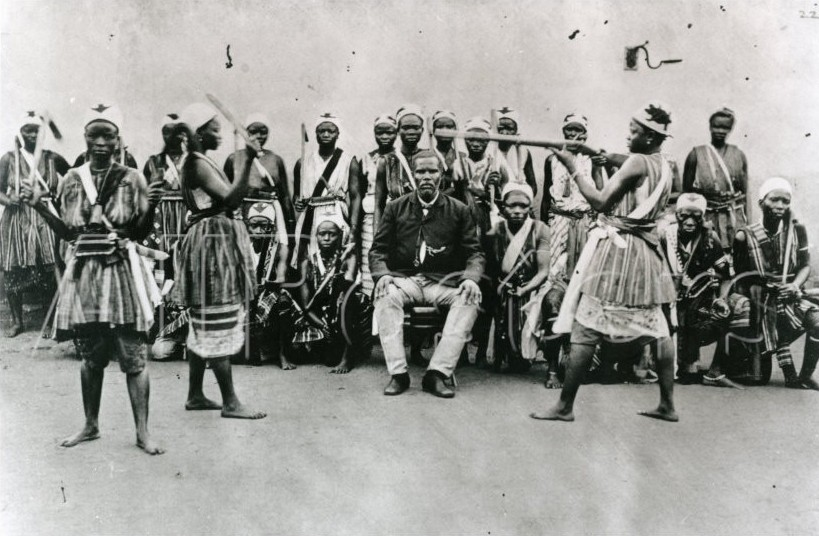
Dahomey Amazons, photo shot around 1890, author unknown

- Russian general and statesman Grigory Potemkin, and then favourite of Catherine the Great created an Amazons Company in 1787. Wives and daughters of the soldiers of the Greek Battalion of Balaklava were enlisted and formed this unit.
- The Mino, or Minon, (Our Mothers) were a late 19th to early 20th-century all-female official military regiment of the former Kingdom of Dahomey (present-day Benin). Since the early 18th-century women contingents had already joined the army, usually during deployment, in order to inflate the army size. However, women proved themselves courageous and effective in active combat, and a regular unit was established. Western observers, who had allegedly perceived certain Amazon-like physical and mental qualities in these women, came up with the trivial epithet Dahomey Amazons.

=== Social and religious activism ===
- During the period 1905–1913, members of the militant Suffragette movement were frequently referred to as "Amazons" in books and newspaper articles.
- In Ukraine Katerina Tarnovska leads a group called the Asgarda which claims to be a new tribe of Amazons. Tarnovska believes that the Amazons are the direct ancestors of Ukrainian women, and she has created an all-female martial art for her group, based on another form of fighting called Combat Hopak, but with a special emphasis on self-defense.

=== Science ===
The Neptune trojans, asteroids 60° ahead or beyond Neptune on its orbit, are individually named after mythological Amazons.

== See also ==
- Action heroine
- Amazons (DC Comics)
- Matriarchy
- List of Amazons
- List of female action heroes and villains
- List of women warriors in folklore
- Onna-bugeisha, female warrior in Japanese nobility
- Shieldmaiden, female warrior in northern Europe
- Timeline of women in ancient warfare
- Tomyris
- Urduja, from Philippine mythology
- Women in the military
- Women warriors in literature and culture

== Sources ==
=== Primary ===
- Homer. "Iliad". Tufts University.
- Diodorus Siculus. "Bibliotheca Historica, Books I-V". Tufts University.
- Herodotus. "The Histories". Tufts University.
- Bacchylides. "Epinicians". Tufts University.
- Aeschylus. "Prometheus Bound". Tufts University.
- Aeschylus. "Suppliant Women". Tufts University.
- Hygnius, Gaius Julius. "Fabulae". Theoi Project.

=== Secondary ===
- Hinge, George (2005). "Herodot zur skythischen Sprache. Arimaspen, Amazonen und die Entdeckung des Schwarzen Meeres". Glotta (in German). 81: 86–115.
- Mayor, Adrienne (2017). "Amazons in the Iranian World". Encyclopaedia Iranica.
- Shahbazi, A.S. (1989). "Amazons". Encyclopaedia Iranica.
