= Thalestris =

Mythical character

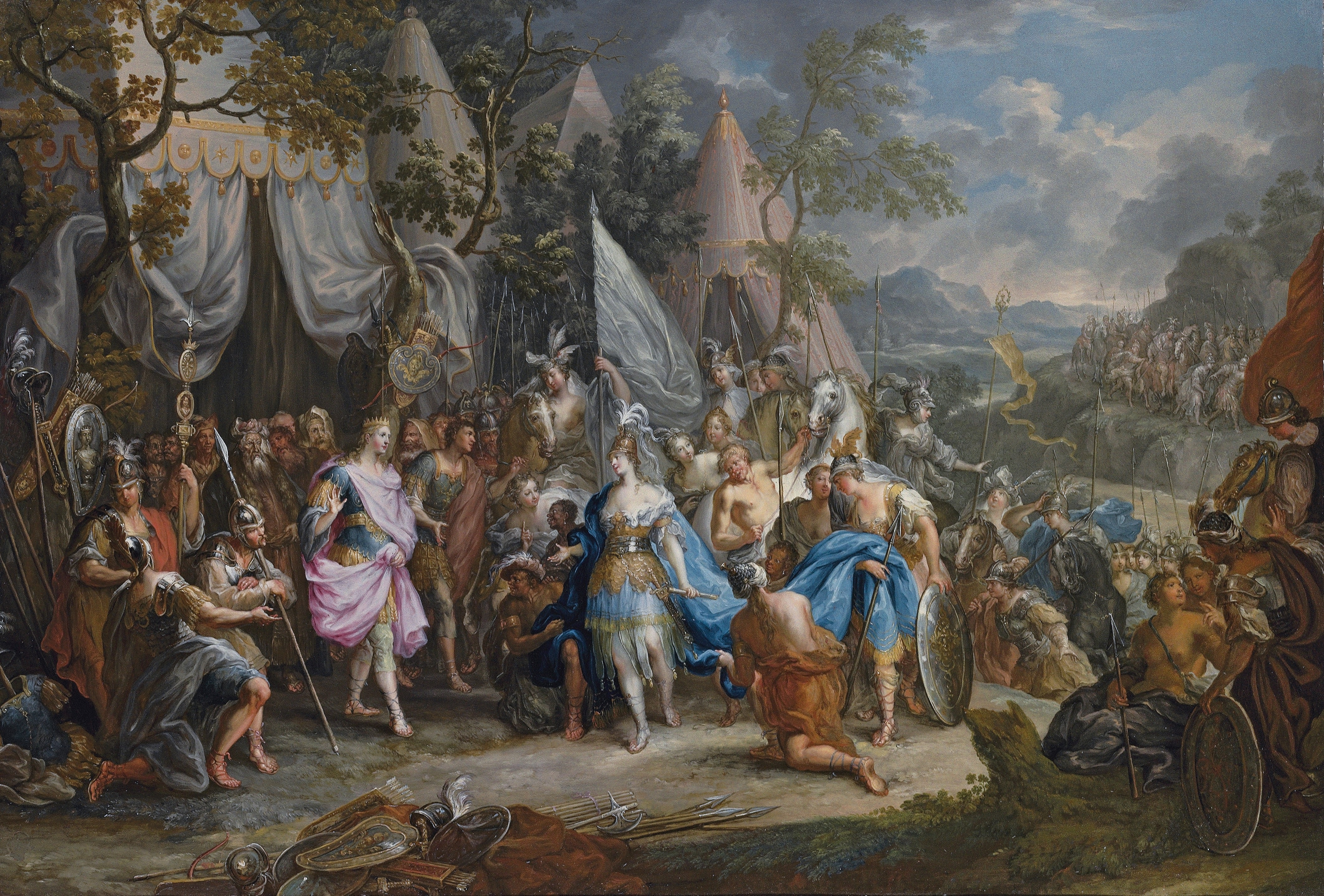
An 18th-century Rococo painting of The Amazon Queen Thalestris in the Camp of Alexander the Great, by Johann Georg Platzer

According to the mythological Greek Alexander Romance, Queen Thalestris (Ancient Greek: Θάληστρις; fl. 334 BC) of the Amazons brought 300 women to Alexander the Great, hoping to breed a race of children as strong and intelligent as he. According to the legend, she stayed with the Macedonian king for 13 days and nights in the hope that the great warrior would father a daughter by her.

== Sources ==
Several of Alexander's biographers dispute the claim, including Plutarch, a highly regarded secondary source. He mentions fourteen authors, some of whom believed the story (Onesicritus, Cleitarchus), while others took it to be only fiction (Aristobulus of Cassandreia, Chares of Mytilene, Ptolemy I of Egypt, Duris of Samos).

Plutarch also mentions when Alexander's secondary naval commander, Onesicritus, was reading the Amazon passage of his Alexander history to King Lysimachus of Thrace who was on the original expedition, the king smiled at him and said "And where was I, then?"

== Historicity ==
The story is rejected by modern scholars as legendary. Perhaps behind the legend lies the offering by a Scythian king of his daughter as a wife for Alexander, as the latter himself wrote in a letter to Antipater.

Another possibility is the story was inspired by the contingent of 100 women warriors sent by Atropates to Alexander in 324 BC. They were called Amazons, arriving on horse and carrying light battle axes and pelta shields. The king sent them back, fearing their presence might incite his male troops to molest them, but he gave them the message he would visit their queen to beget children by her, referencing the popular Amazon custom. These women have been interpreted as product of the Achaemenid custom to train female bodyguards, mere prostitutes playing roles, or true members of Eurasian tribes where women were trained for war, like Scythians themselves, It has been interpreted that Alexander sent them back not because they might be threatened, as his army was accustomed to travel with concubines, but because of the cultural clash of fighting alongside women.

== Modern references ==
Thalestris is also the name of a character in Mary Renault's historical novel The King Must Die, set in the time of the mythological Theseus, who lived - if he existed at all - a thousand years or more before Alexander. The Thalestris character is depicted by Renault as a skilled Amazonian bull-dancer and valiant warrior - which is presumably why the writer gave her the name of an Amazon queen.

In Alexander Pope’s mock heroic poem The Rape of the Lock, Thalestris is the name of a ‘fierce’ supporter of Belinda, whose lock of hair is stolen - a ‘Virago’ who urges Belinda into combat to regain the lock.

There is also a brief reference to the courtship between Alexander and Thalestris in Beaumarchais' Le Mariage De Figaro.
