= Harmonia (nymph) =

Nymph of Greek mythology

In Greek mythology, Harmonia (/hɑːrˈmoʊniə/; Ancient Greek: Ἁρμονία means 'harmony, concord') was a nymph, perhaps a naiad or dryad, in the glens of the Akmonian wood. She was the lover of Ares of whom she bore the warrior-women race of the Amazons.
