= The Battle of the Amazons (Rubens) =

Painting usually attributed to Peter Paul Rubens

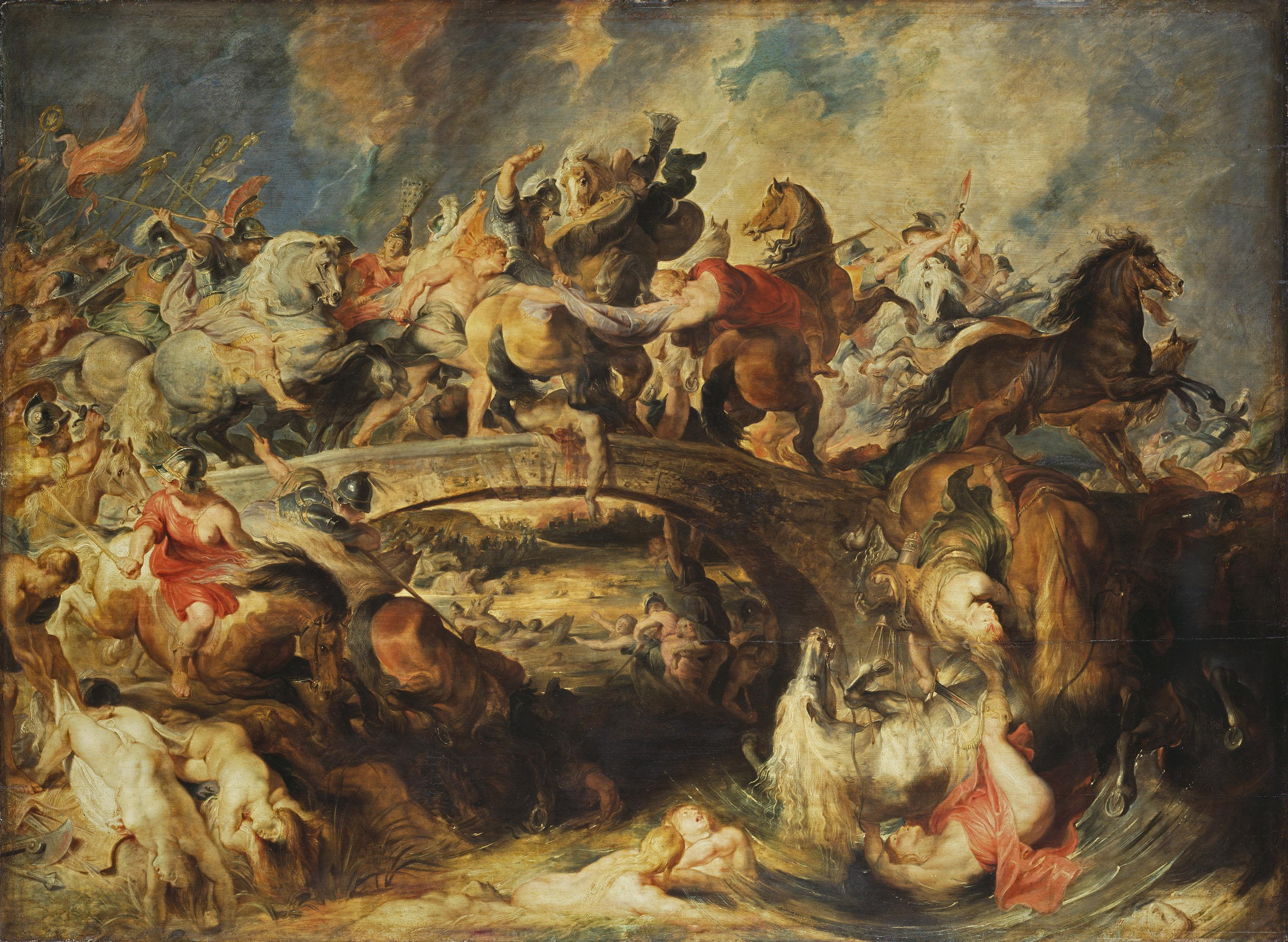
- Artist: Peter Paul Rubens
- Year: c. 1618
- Medium: oil on wood
- Dimensions: 121 cm × 165.5 cm (48 in × 65.2 in)
- Location: Alte Pinakothek; Munich

The Battle of the Amazons or Amazonomachia is an oil on wood painting produced around 1618. It shows an amazonomachy, i.e. a mythological battle between the ancient Greeks and the Amazons, a nation of all-female warriors.

The work by Rubens shows his huge admiration for Leonardo da Vinci's Battle of Anghiari, of which he owned a copy which he had touched up. It is in the collection of the Alte Pinakothek in Munich.

This painting was formerly in the collection of Cornelis van der Geest and can be seen in two paintings of his art gallery in the 1630s by Willem van Haecht.

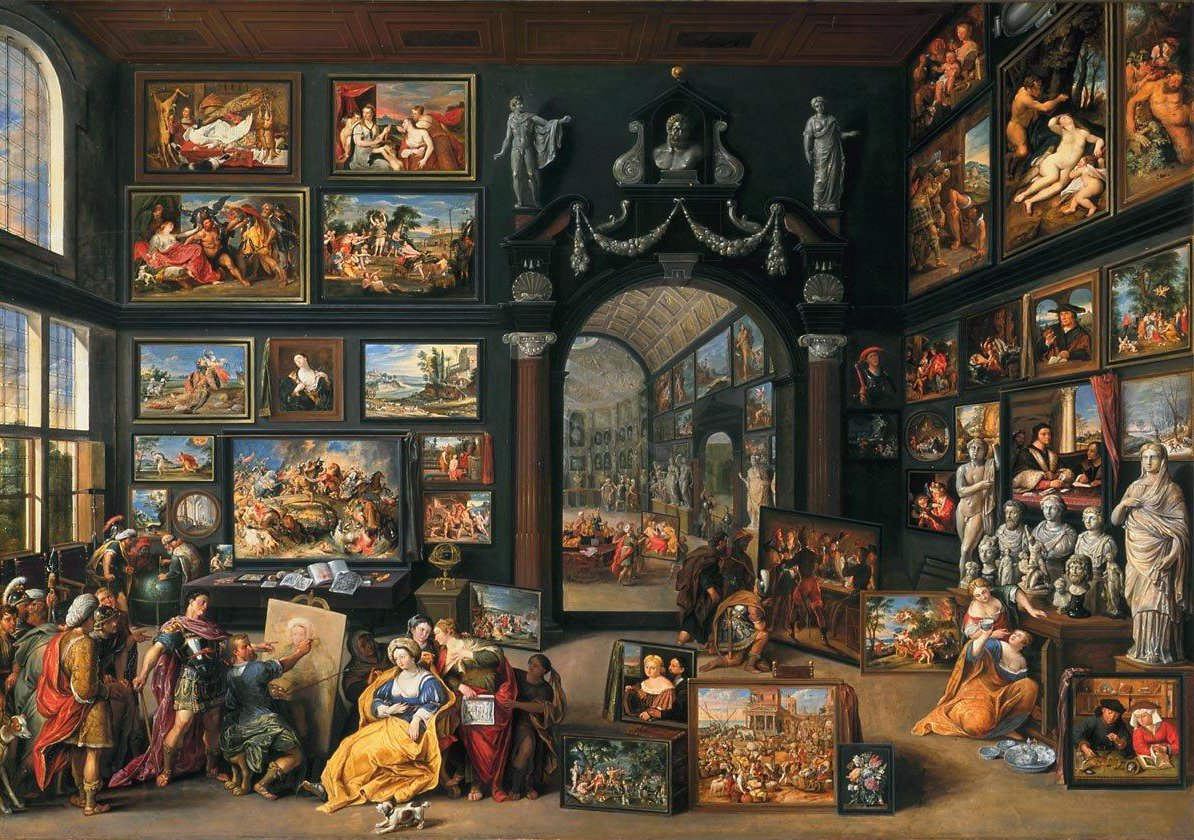
Apelles painting Campaspe, 1630

The Gallery of Cornelis van der Geest, 1628
