= Eurypyle (Amazon) =

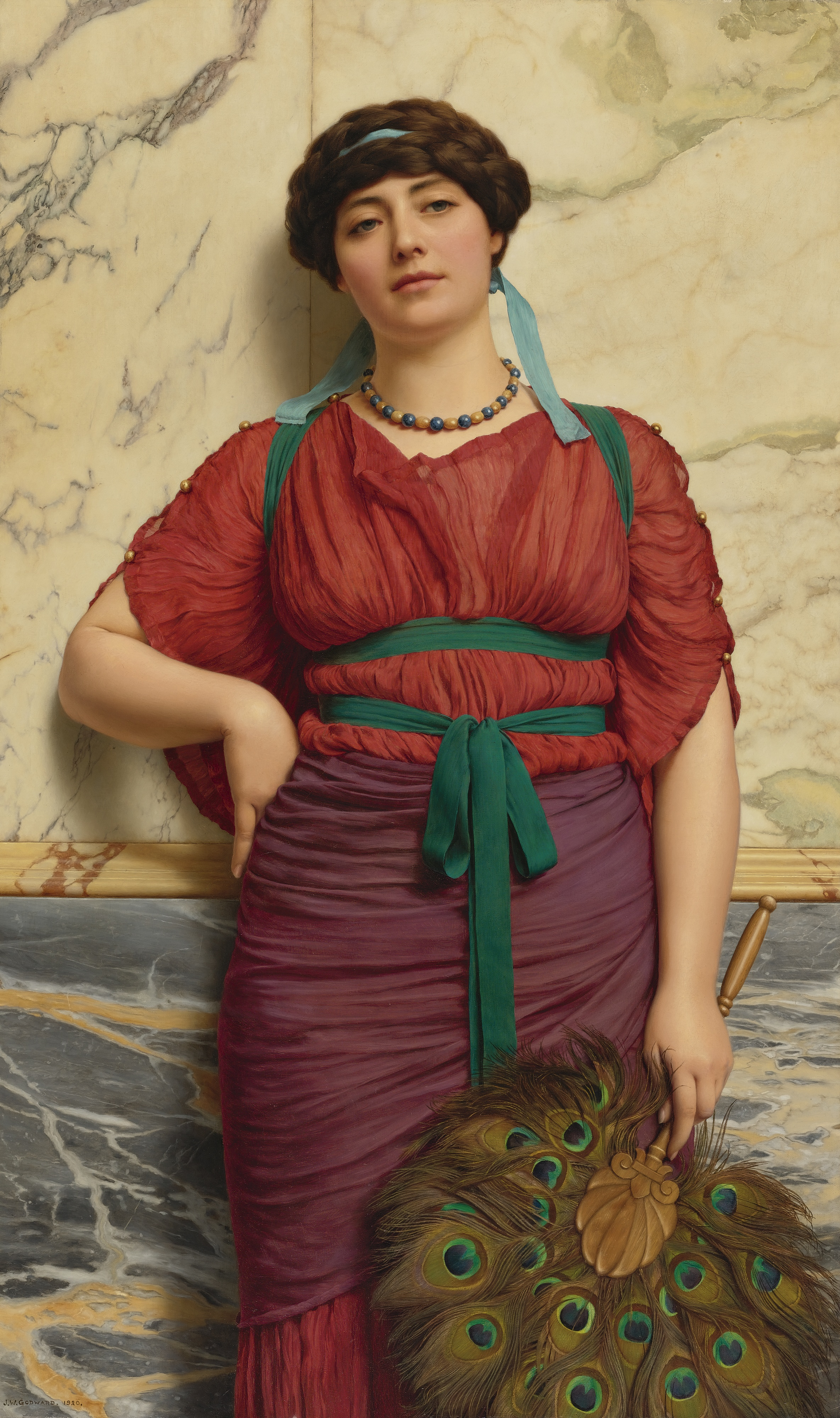
John William Godward - Eurypyle, 1920

Eurypyle (Ancient Greek: Εὐρυπύλη, lit. 'wide-gated' or 'wide gate') was a queen of the Amazons who was reported to have led an expedition against Ninun and Babylon.
