= Marpe =

Marpe may refer to:

- Marpe (Salwey), a river of North Rhine-Westphalia, Germany
- Marpe, one of the Amazons challenging Heracles according to Diodorus Siculus
- Detlev Marpe, German engineer
