= Polemusa =

In Greek mythology, Polemusa (Ancient Greek: Πολεμοῦσά, romanized: Polemousa, lit. 'make hostile' or 'make an enemy of') was one of the Amazons, a race of warrior-women. She came with their queen, Penthesilia to the Trojan War. Polemusa was killed by the hero Achilles during the siege of Troy.
