= Harmothoe (mythology) =

Harmothoe or Harmothoë (Ancient Greek: Ἁρμοθόη, romanized: Harmothóē, lit. 'fast-fitting', 'swift-joining' or 'nimble coordinator') is the name of two personages in Greek mythology.

- Harmothoe, the "dark-eyed" Amazonian warrior. She was one of Penthesilea's twelve companions at Troy. Harmothoe was killed in the Trojan War by the hero Achilles, according to Quintus Smyrnaeus's Fall of Troy.
- Harmothoë, the wife of Pandareus and mother of his children. She followed him to Sicily after he tried to steal from Zeus where they both died.
