= Tecmessa =

Figures in Greek mythology

The name Tecmessa (Ancient Greek: Τέκμησσα, romanized: Tékmēssa) refers to the following characters in Greek mythology:

- Tecmessa, daughter of Teleutas, King of Phrygia, or Teuthras, King of Teuthrania in Mysia, or Tethras or Teuthas. During the Trojan War, Telamonian Ajax kills Tecmessa's father and takes her captive; his reason for doing so may have been, as the 1st-century BC Roman poet, Horace, wrote, that Ajax was captivated by Tecmessa's beauty. In Sophocles' Ajax, Tecmessa unsuccessfully tries to dissuade Ajax from committing suicide. She is the first to find his corpse, which she promptly covers with her own clothing to prevent further heartache. Their infant son, Eurysaces, however, survives the incident.
- Tecmessa, one of the Amazons killed by Heracles in his quest for the girdle of Hippolyte.
