= Antibrote (mythology) =

Amazon in Greek mythology

In Greek mythology, Antibrote (Ancient Greek: Ἀντιβρότη, romanized: Antibrotē, lit. 'equal to man' or 'counterpart to mortals/ men') was one of the Amazons, a race of warrior-women. She was one of Penthesilea's twelve companions at Troy.

== Mythology ==
Antibrote was killed in the Trojan War by the hero Achilles, according to Quintus Smyrnaeus's Fall of Troy:
