= Xanthe (mythology) =

Female name of several Greek mythological figures

In Greek mythology, Xanthe (/ˈzænθiː/; Ancient Greek: Ξανθή or Ξάνθη, romanized: Xanthê, lit. 'blond-haired') or Xantho may refer to the following divinity and women:

- Xanthe, one of the 3,000 Oceanids, water-nymph daughters of the Titans Oceanus and his sister-wife Tethys.
- Xantho, one of the 50 Nereids, sea-nymph daughters of the 'Old Man of the Sea' Nereus and the Oceanid Doris.
- Xanthe, wife of Asclepius in the Messenian version of the story. Machaon was her son.
- Xanthe, one of the Amazons.
- Xantho, one of the maenads named in a vase painting.
