= Antandre =

In Greek mythology, Antandre (Ancient Greek: Ἀντάνδρη, romanized: Antandré, lit. 'she who precedes men' or 'equal to a man') was an Amazonian warrior. She was one of the Penthesilea's twelve companions at Troy.

== Mythology ==
Antandre was killed in the Trojan War by the hero Achilles, according to Quintus Smyrnaeus's Fall of Troy:

"But Peleus' son [i.e. Achilles] burst on the Amazons smiting Antandre..."
