= Euryale =

Set of mythological Greek characters

In Greek mythology, Euryale (/jʊəˈraɪəli/ yoor-EYE-ə-lee; Ancient Greek: Εὐρυάλη, lit. 'far-roaming"') was the name of several mythological figures, including:

- Euryale, one of the three Gorgon sisters.
- Euryale, daughter of Minos, mother of the great hunter Orion.
- Euryale, one of the Amazons
