= Prothoe (mythology) =

In Greek mythology, Prothoe or Prothoë (Ancient Greek: Προθόη, romanized: Prothoē, lit. 'running ahead', 'rushing forward' or 'first in swiftness') may refer to two distinct women:

- Prothoë, one of the nurses of the god Dionysus who accompanied and supported him during his legendary campaign in India.
- Prothoë, one of the Amazons. Before meeting Heracles, she was renowned for having won seven individual duels against her opponents, but she was eventually defeated and killed by the hero in the battle.
