= Hypsicrates =

1st century BC Greek historian

Hypsicrates (Ancient Greek: Ὑψικράτης) the historian was a Greek writer in Rome who flourished in the 1st century BC. His work does not survive, but scholars have conjectures about the writer and his work. He was associated probably with Pontus and wrote a history of the area that was possibly used by Strabo. He may be the same Hypsicrates who served as a slave for Julius Caesar and was freed by Caesar in 47 BC.

Historian Adrienne Mayor has suggested that Hypsicrates may be Hypsicratea, the concubine or wife of King Mithradates of Pontus, who may have disguised herself as a man after Mithdradates’ death. Archaeological evidence and the writings of Plutarch confirm that she was sometimes referred to as Hypsicrates, the male version of her name, during Mithradates’ lifetime.
