= Derinoe =

In Greek mythology, Derinoe (Ancient Greek: Δηρινόη, romanized: Dērinóē, lit. 'battle-minded' or 'she of the warring mind') was one of the Amazons, a race of warrior-women. She came with their queen, Penthesilia to the Trojan War.

== Mythology ==
During the siege of Troy, Derinoe killed the Achaean warrior Laogonus and was in turn smote in the throat and shoulder by the spear of Ajax the Lesser.
