= Bremusa =

In Greek Mythology, Bremusa (Ancient Greek: Βρεμούσα, lit. 'furious woman', 'raging one' or 'roaring female') was one of a group of 12 Amazonian warriors. She was born in Themiskyra in 1204 BC and fought with Penthesilea.

== Mythology ==
Bremusa was killed outside of Troy by Idomeneus of Crete.

"Then with his lance Idomeneus thrust out, and by the right breast stabbed Bremusa. Stilled for ever was the beating of her heart. She fell, as falls a graceful-shafted pine hewn mid the hills by woodmen: heavily, sighing through all its boughs, it crashes down. So with a wailing shriek she fell, and death unstrung her every limb: her breathing soul mingled with multitudinous-sighing winds."
