= Greek Battalion of Balaklava =

Military unit of the Imperial Russian Army

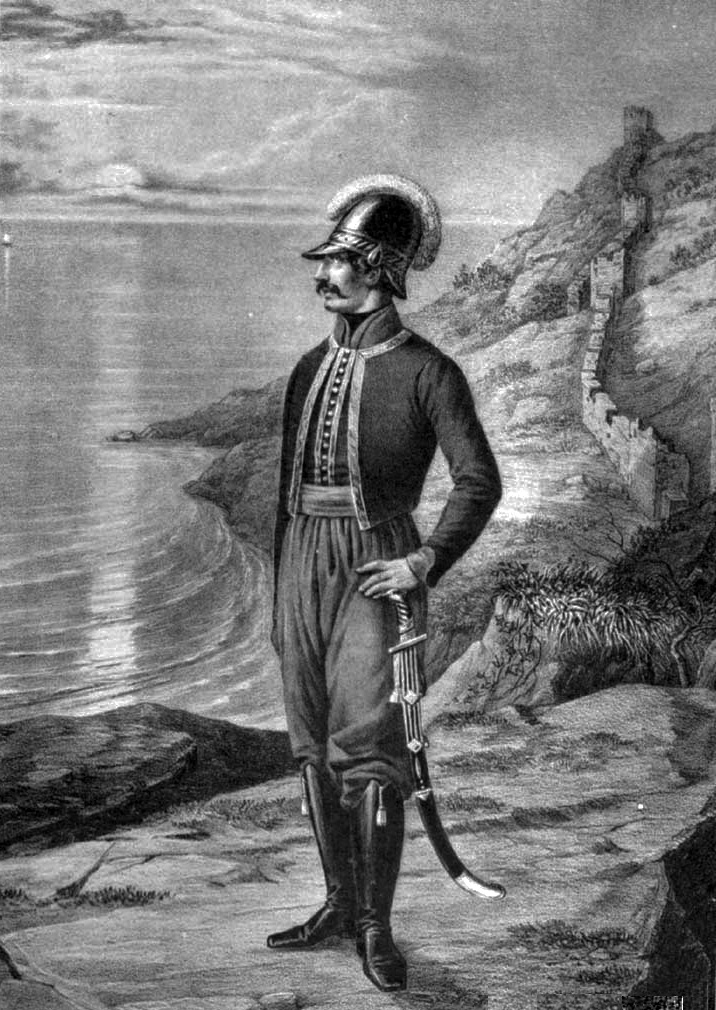
- Officer of the Greek Battalion of Balaklava
- Active: 1775–1859
- Disbanded: 1859
- Country: Russian Empire
- Allegiance: Tsar of Russia
- Branch: Imperial Russian Army
- Type: Battalion
- Garrison/HQ: Balaklava
- Engagements: Russo-Turkish War (1768–1774); Russo-Turkish War (1787–1792); Russo-Turkish War (1806–1812); Napoleonic Wars; French invasion of Russia; Crimean War

Commanders
- Notable commanders: Stefanos Beis Mavromichalis; Konstantinos Zaponis; Theodosis Reveliotis; Lykourgos Katsonis

The Greek Battalion of Balaklava was a military unit of the Imperial Russian Army which participated in the Russo-Turkish wars of 1768–1774, 1787–1792 and 1806–1812. It consisted of Greek expatriates who were living in the Balaklava area.

== History ==
Initially the battalion was named "Greek Infantry Regiment" and in 1797 was renamed to "Greek Balaklava Battalion". Its Greek soldiers were from the Peloponnese, the Aegean islands, the Ionian Islands and the Venetian dominions in Albania. They were experienced in guerrilla warfare and contributed significantly to the Russian annexation of Crimea and the expulsion of the Ottomans from the area.

In the 1787-1789 war they fought also at sea with the Dnieper oared flotilla and the Black Sea Fleet. The battalion's contribution was crucial in the battles for the capture of Kaffa (Feodosiya) (1783) and the siege of the fortress of Sudak. They participated in the Russian suppression of the Tatar uprising of 1777-1778 which was supported by the Ottoman Empire and of the Tatar rebellion during the 1812 war against Napoleon. In the 1853-1856 Crimean War they opposed the British occupation of the city and port of Balaklava.

The base of the Greek Infantry Regiment was Balaklava after the imperial decree of February 18, 1784. The soldiers settled in Balaklava with their families, a total number of about 500 adults in 1778, increased to about 1,700 in 1802.

According to the April 4, 1797 imperial decree the battalion was composed of three companies, each having 100 soldiers. Including officers and other staff its total force amounted to 396 people. The soldiers were issued red and green uniforms and weaponry of the same type. The battalion’s organisation and operation was modeled on the armed divisions of the Don Cossacks, since these were closer to the Greek character and ethnic traditions. Among the battalion’s commanders were Captain Stefanos Beis Mavromichalis (1775-1779, 1794-1801), Major Konstantinos Zaponis (1790-1794), General Theodosis Reveliotis (1809-1831) and Lieutenant Colonel Lykourgos Katsonis, son of Lambros Katsonis, (1831-1859).

The battalion was disbanded in 1859.

== The "Amazons" of the Battalion ==
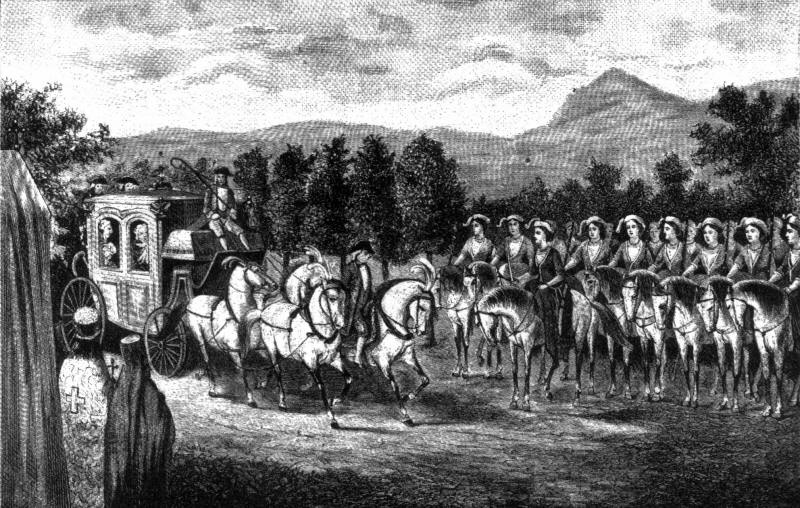
The Amazons Company salute Catherine II the Great in Crimea (1787)

In 1787 Catherine the Great embarked on a long inspection tour in Tauris which lasted from January to July. Diplomatic delegates of England, France and Austria were invited to accompany her. The tour was intended to show the economic and military abilities of the New Russia and also the newly acquired territory. For the occasion, Grigory Potemkin, one of the Russia's highest officials and Catherine's favourite, formed a military unit of women as a re-enactment of the mythic Amazons, led by a queen, who supposedly fought in the Russian plains. Under the orders of the commander K.G. Zaponis and his friend Pavlos Sarantis (Sarantov), some one hundred female family members of the Greek soldiers were enlisted and formed an "Amazons battalion" headed by Eleni Ivanovna Sarantova, the wife of the Greek Ioannis Sarantis. The latter was Potemkin's friend and later was appointed councillor in Crimea's Court. The women were given intensive military training in riding, swordplay and firing guns. On May 24 (June 4) 1787, the "Amazon's battalion" gave an official reception to Catherine in the village Kadıköy, on horseback, in colourful uniforms and armed with long barrel rifles. Other Greeks, including a priest, from the nearby Balaklava took part in the reception ceremony. It seems that the spectacle impressed the foreign noble visitors as Joseph the II expressed his gratification with warm embraces and a visit to the camp of the battalion while other diplomats noted it as part of the spectacular events that Potemkin organized in order to impress Catherine and foreign guests. Eleni Sarantova was granted the rank of captain and presented with a diamond bracelet. The battalion was awarded 10,000 rubles. It escorted Catherine on her tour and was dissolved after its completion.

== Sources ==
- Moschuri, I. V. (2013). "Служащие поселенного в Балаклаве Греческого пехотного полка: греки или арнауты?" [Servicemen in the Greek Infantry Regiment of Balaklava: Greeks or Albanians?]. Греки Балаклавы и Севастополя [Greeks of Balaklava and Sevastopol] (PDF) (in Russian). Moscow: Indrik. pp. 71–76. ISBN 978-5-91674-250-3.
- Pappas, Nicholas Charles (1991). Greeks in Russian Military Service in the Late 18th and Early 19th Centuries. Thessaloniki: Institute for Balkan Studies.
- Pinchuk, S. A. (2013). "Балаклавский греческий пехотный батальон в первой четверти XIX в." [The Greek Infantry Battalion of Balaklava in the First Quarter of the 19th c.]. Греки Балаклавы и Севастополя [Greeks of Balaklava and Sevastopol] (PDF) (in Russian). Moscow: Indrik. pp. 77–106. ISBN 978-5-91674-250-3.
- Pryakhin, Yu. D. (2013). "Некоторые аспекты по явления в Крыму Греческого пехотного полка, его размещения в Балаклаве, службы воинов-греков" [Some Aspects of the Appearance in the Crimea of the Greek Infantry Regiment, its Deployment in Balaklava, the Service of Greek Soldiers]. Греки Балаклавы и Севастополя [Greeks of Balaklava and Sevastopol] (PDF) (in Russian). Moscow: Indrik. pp. 57–70. ISBN 978-5-91674-250-3.
