= Brown ribbon =

Type of award for winning various contests

Brown ribbon

A brown ribbon is a type of award given to winners of various contests. At county and state fairs in the United States, a brown ribbon is the award for placing eighth in a contest. In Nazi Germany, the "Brown Ribbon" was an annual July horse race run in Munich from 1934 to 1944.

== Usage as an awareness ribbon ==
Brown ribbons also represent anti-tobacco and colorectal cancer (brown is the alternate color, dark blue is the official colorectal cancer ribbon color).

Brown ribbons have also been proposed by comedian George Carlin, meaning "Eat shit motherfucker", as a cynical response to the preponderance of other ribbons as symbols of political or social movements.

Internet comedy blogger Allie Brosh of Hyperbole and a Half has suggested her fans wear a brown ribbon to raise awareness of her blog, as well as to support 'terminally adult people all over the world'.

P. J. O'Rourke has indirectly suggested a brown ribbon campaign to fight diarrhea:

"Political means could be used to prevent almost all deaths from childhood diarrhea. Diarrhea is spread by contaminated water. Public sanitation is, like personal security, national defense, and rule of law, one of the few valid reasons for politics to exist. Lowly, semicomic diarrhea kills 2,866,000 people a year worldwide, 2,474,000 of them children under the age of five. This is ten times the number of people who die from AIDS. But no one is wearing a brown ribbon on his tuxedo lapel at the Academy Awards or marching up the Mall in Washington carrying a sign reading DIARRHEA -- IT CAN BE CONTAINED."

Brown ribbons are worn in South Africa in protest against farm attacks. These brutal attacks targeting farmers increases every year (South African Farm Attacks).
