= Johann Georg Platzer =

Austrian painter and draughtsman (1704–1761)

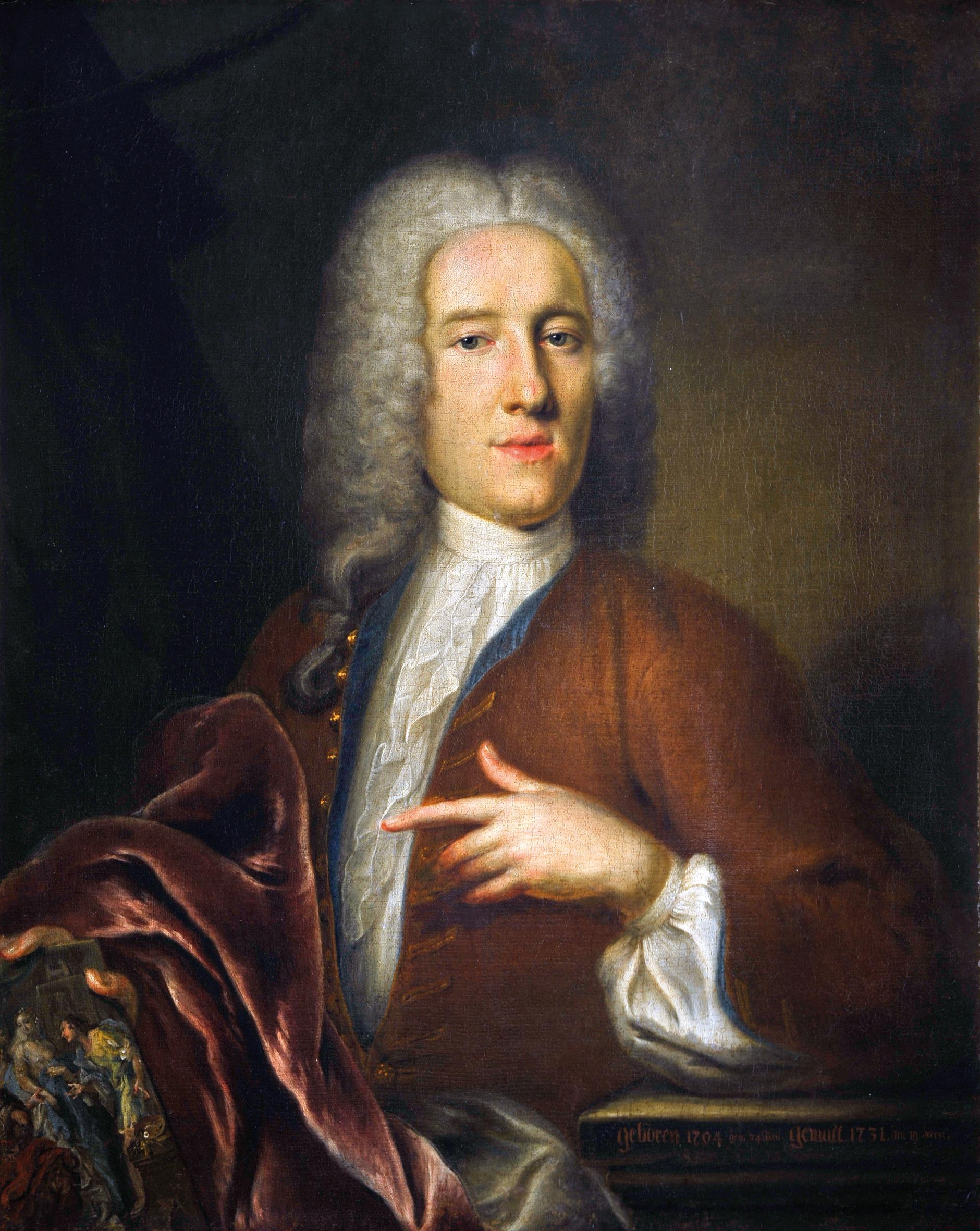
- Johann Georg Platzer, Self-portrait, 1731
- Born: 24 June 1704; Eppan, County of South Tyrol, Austria
- Died: 10 December 1761 (aged 57); Eppan, County of South Tyrol, Austria
- Known for: Painter, draughtsman, sculptor and print-maker
- Movement: Orientalist; Rococo

Johann Georg Platzer (1704–1761) was a prolific Austrian Rococo painter and draughtsman.

== Life and career ==
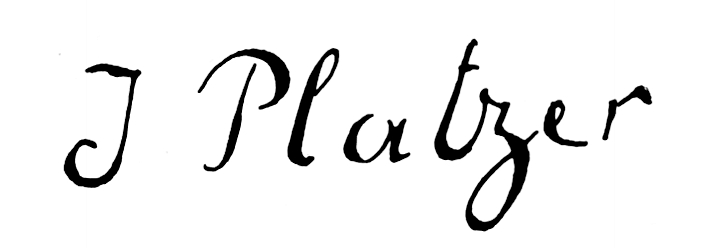
Johann Georg Platzer's signature

Platzer was born in Eppan in the County of Tyrol, and came from a family of painters. He painted primarily historical and mythical scenes. The Joanneum Alte Galerie in Graz houses the largest collection of Platzer's work under a single roof. Platzer worked with his uncle as a court painter in Passau. He returned to Eppan where he continued to work until his death in 1761.

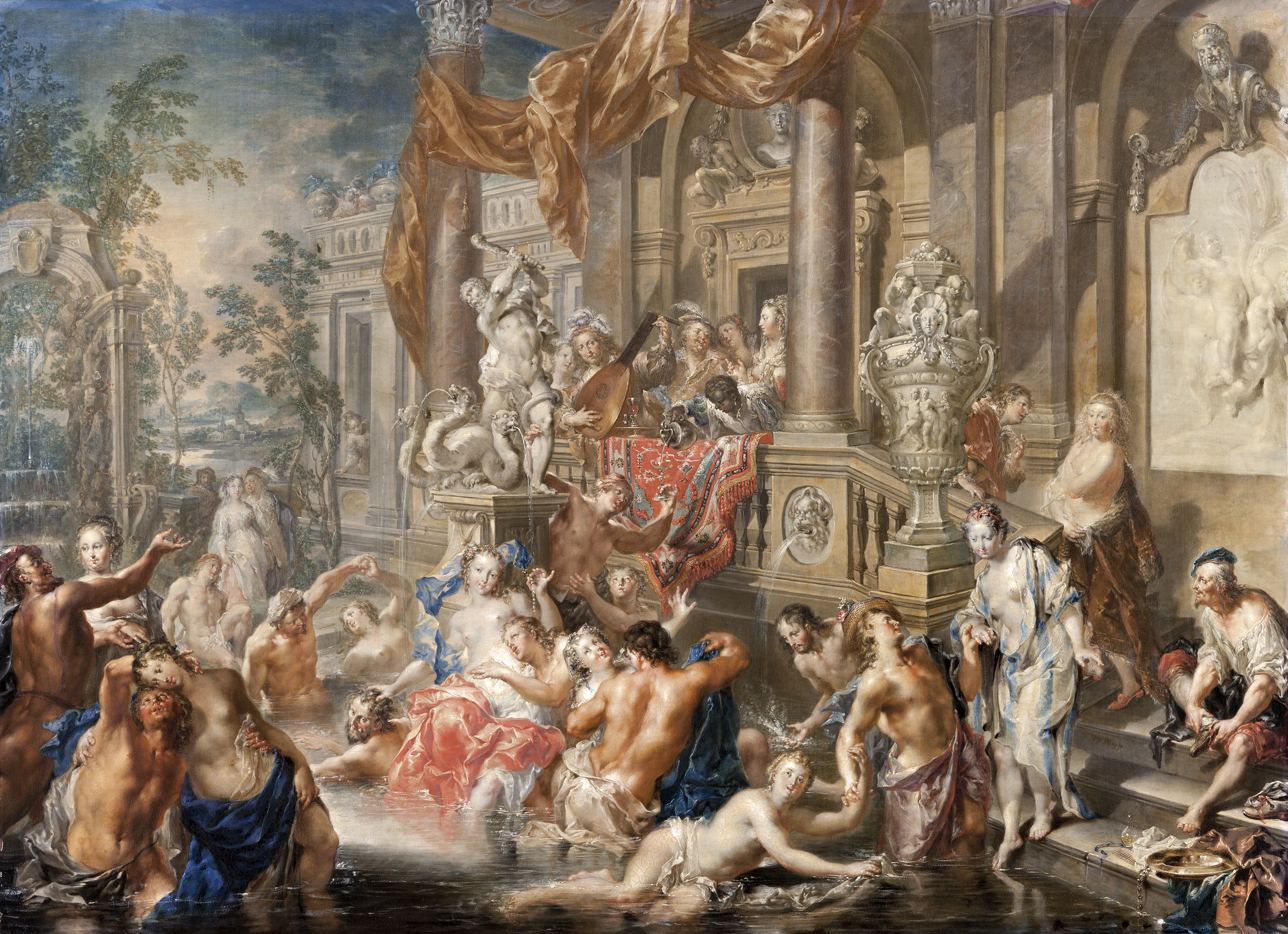
Fountain scene in front of a palace, 1730s.

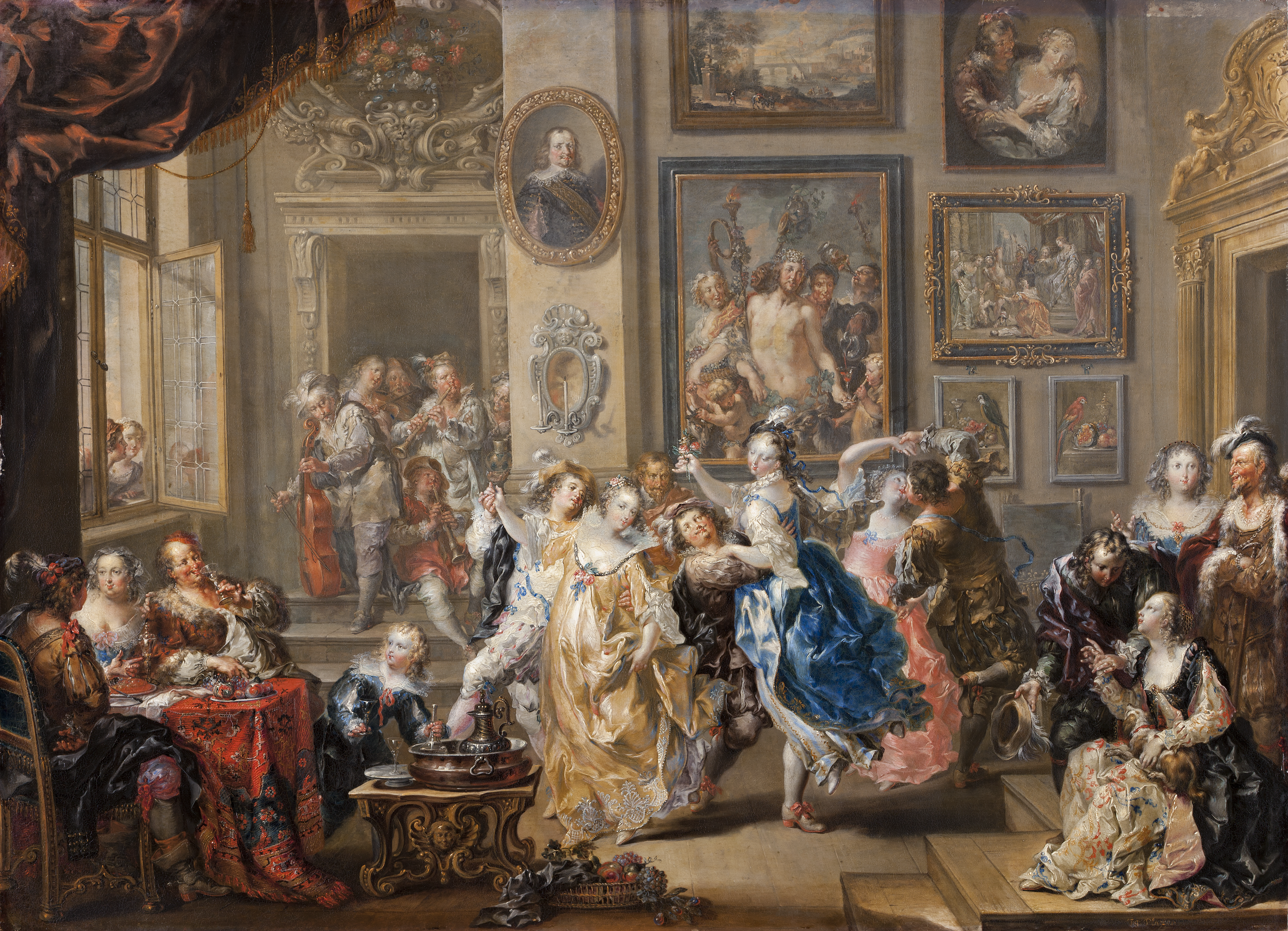
Dancing scene with palace interior, 1730s.

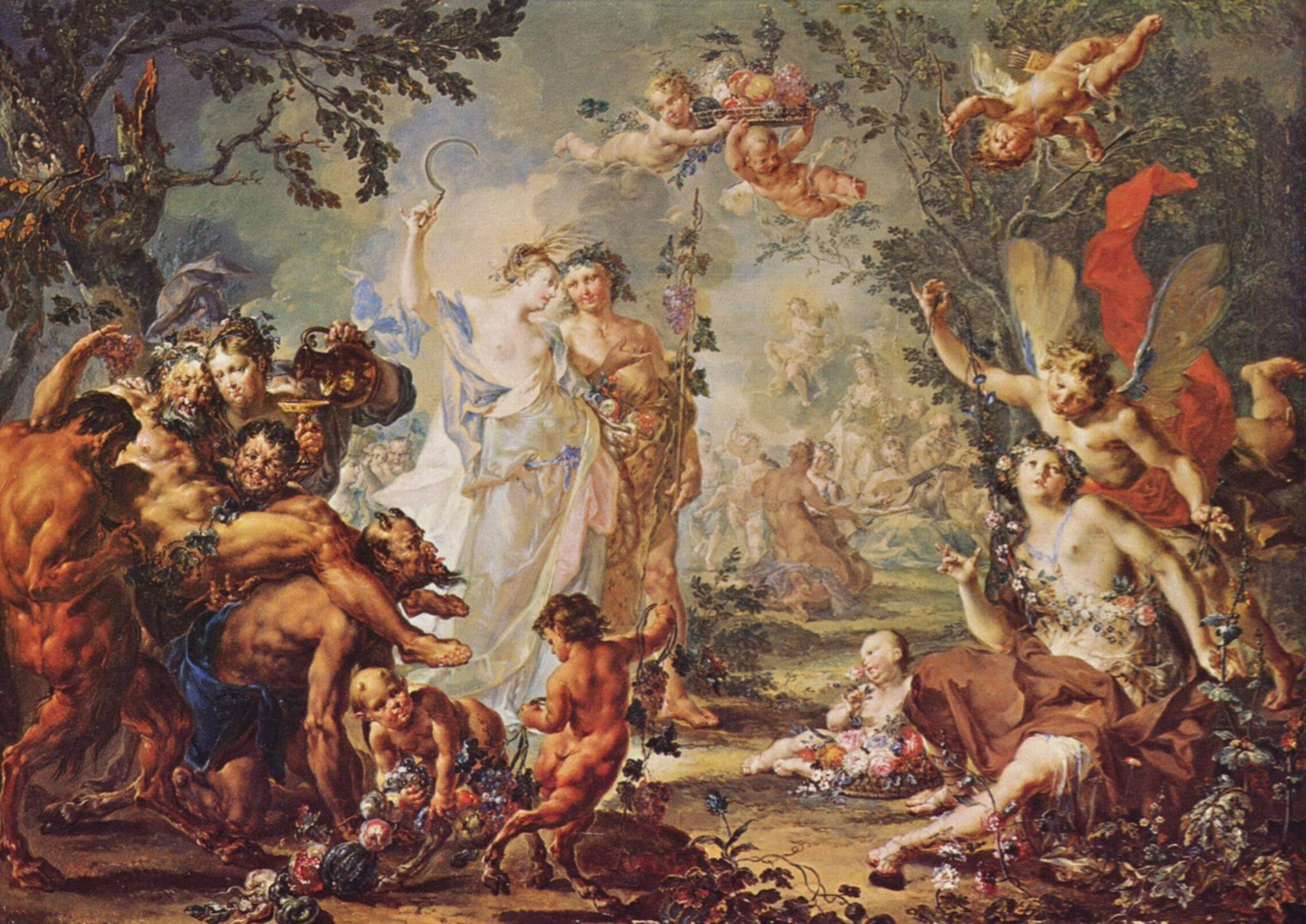
Allegory of the Four Seasons, 1750.

== See also ==
- List of Orientalist artists
