= Aesymnus (mythology) =

In Greek mythology, Aesymnus (Ancient Greek: Αἴσυμνος, romanized: Aisymnos, lit. 'one who rules with justice', 'judge' or 'one who allots a just portion'') was a Greek warrior in the Trojan War.

== Mythology ==
Aesymnus was slain by Hector just before the Trojans attack the Greek ship's camp in the tenth year of the battle.

"Who then was first to be slain, and who last by Hector, Priam's son, when Zeus vouchsafed him glory? Asaeus first, and Autonous, and Opites and Dolops, son of Clytius, and Opheltius, and Agelaus, and Aesymnus, and Orus, and Hipponous, staunch in fight. These leaders of the Danaans he slew and thereafter fell upon the multitude, and even as when the West Wind driveth the clouds of the white South Wind, smiting them with a violent squall, and many a swollen wave rolleth onward, and on high the spray is scattered beneath the blast of the wandering wind; even so many heads of the host were laid low by Hector."

== Legacy ==
Aesymnus' name inspired 231666 Aisymnos, a Jupiter trojan.
