= Asaeus =

Achaean warrior in Greed mythology

In Greek mythology, Asaeus (Ancient Greek: Ἀσαῖον) was an Achaean warrior who was slain in the Trojan War by the hero Hector, son of King Priam and Queen Hecuba of Troy.
