= Opites =

Warrior in Greek mythology

In Greek mythology, Opites (Ancient Greek: Ὀπίτην) was an Achaean warrior who participated in the Trojan War. He was slain by the Trojan hero Hector during the siege of Troy.
