= List of minor planets: 231001–232000 =

The following is a partial list of minor planets, running from minor-planet number 231001 through 232000, inclusive. The primary data for this and other partial lists is based on JPL's "Small-Body Orbital Elements" and data available from the Minor Planet Center. Critical list information is also provided by the MPC, unless otherwise specified from Lowell Observatory. A detailed description of the table's columns and additional sources are given on the main page including a complete list of every page in this series, and a statistical break-up on the dynamical classification of minor planets.

Also see the summary list of all named bodies in numerical and alphabetical order, and the corresponding naming citations for the number range of this particular list. New namings may only be added to this list after official publication, as the preannouncement of names is condemned by the Working Group for Small Bodies Nomenclature of the International Astronomical Union.

| Near-Earth obj. | MBA (inner) | MBA (outer) | Centaur |
| Mars-crosser | MBA (middle) | Jupiter trojan | Trans-Neptunian obj. |
| Unclassified |

== 231001–231100 ==
| Designation | | | Discovery | | | Properties | | Ref |
| Permanent | Provisional | Named after | Date | Site | Discoverer(s) | Category | Diam. | Ref |
|---|---|---|---|---|---|---|---|---|
| 231001 | 2005 EV_{5} | — | March 1, 2005 | Kitt Peak | Spacewatch | · | 5.3 km | MPC · JPL |
| 231002 | 2005 ED_{10} | — | March 2, 2005 | Kitt Peak | Spacewatch | · | 3.4 km | MPC · JPL |
| 231003 | 2005 EJ_{15} | — | March 3, 2005 | Kitt Peak | Spacewatch | · | 3.2 km | MPC · JPL |
| 231004 | 2005 EK_{21} | — | March 3, 2005 | Catalina | CSS | · | 7.0 km | MPC · JPL |
| 231005 | 2005 EU_{22} | — | March 3, 2005 | Catalina | CSS | AEG | 3.0 km | MPC · JPL |
| 231006 | 2005 EE_{24} | — | March 3, 2005 | Catalina | CSS | · | 5.0 km | MPC · JPL |
| 231007 | 2005 EU_{33} | — | March 4, 2005 | Catalina | CSS | · | 2.5 km | MPC · JPL |
| 231008 | 2005 EP_{36} | — | March 4, 2005 | Catalina | CSS | · | 3.5 km | MPC · JPL |
| 231009 | 2005 ES_{40} | — | March 1, 2005 | Kitt Peak | Spacewatch | THM | 4.7 km | MPC · JPL |
| 231010 | 2005 ET_{41} | — | March 1, 2005 | Kitt Peak | Spacewatch | · | 4.2 km | MPC · JPL |
| 231011 | 2005 EJ_{47} | — | March 3, 2005 | Kitt Peak | Spacewatch | · | 2.6 km | MPC · JPL |
| 231012 | 2005 ED_{61} | — | March 4, 2005 | Catalina | CSS | · | 2.0 km | MPC · JPL |
| 231013 | 2005 EV_{64} | — | March 4, 2005 | Socorro | LINEAR | THM | 2.9 km | MPC · JPL |
| 231014 | 2005 EF_{68} | — | March 7, 2005 | Socorro | LINEAR | · | 6.3 km | MPC · JPL |
| 231015 | 2005 EN_{72} | — | March 2, 2005 | Catalina | CSS | · | 4.4 km | MPC · JPL |
| 231016 | 2005 EQ_{72} | — | March 2, 2005 | Catalina | CSS | EOS | 3.2 km | MPC · JPL |
| 231017 | 2005 EH_{80} | — | March 3, 2005 | Catalina | CSS | LIX | 5.4 km | MPC · JPL |
| 231018 | 2005 ER_{85} | — | March 4, 2005 | Socorro | LINEAR | EOS | 3.3 km | MPC · JPL |
| 231019 | 2005 EP_{86} | — | March 4, 2005 | Socorro | LINEAR | · | 6.0 km | MPC · JPL |
| 231020 | 2005 EW_{100} | — | March 3, 2005 | Catalina | CSS | VER | 3.6 km | MPC · JPL |
| 231021 | 2005 EZ_{101} | — | March 3, 2005 | Catalina | CSS | · | 3.9 km | MPC · JPL |
| 231022 | 2005 EW_{131} | — | March 9, 2005 | Anderson Mesa | LONEOS | · | 4.7 km | MPC · JPL |
| 231023 | 2005 EP_{138} | — | March 9, 2005 | Socorro | LINEAR | · | 4.8 km | MPC · JPL |
| 231024 | 2005 EM_{149} | — | March 10, 2005 | Kitt Peak | Spacewatch | · | 7.0 km | MPC · JPL |
| 231025 | 2005 EU_{152} | — | March 10, 2005 | Kitt Peak | Spacewatch | THM | 3.1 km | MPC · JPL |
| 231026 | 2005 EN_{189} | — | March 11, 2005 | Mount Lemmon | Mount Lemmon Survey | TEL | 2.1 km | MPC · JPL |
| 231027 | 2005 EZ_{196} | — | March 11, 2005 | Anderson Mesa | LONEOS | · | 4.5 km | MPC · JPL |
| 231028 | 2005 EZ_{215} | — | March 8, 2005 | Anderson Mesa | LONEOS | · | 5.3 km | MPC · JPL |
| 231029 | 2005 ET_{221} | — | March 12, 2005 | Socorro | LINEAR | · | 5.8 km | MPC · JPL |
| 231030 | 2005 EQ_{223} | — | March 12, 2005 | Kitt Peak | Spacewatch | THM | 3.7 km | MPC · JPL |
| 231031 | 2005 EM_{225} | — | March 9, 2005 | Catalina | CSS | · | 5.1 km | MPC · JPL |
| 231032 | 2005 EL_{226} | — | March 9, 2005 | Catalina | CSS | EOS | 3.4 km | MPC · JPL |
| 231033 | 2005 EH_{238} | — | March 11, 2005 | Kitt Peak | Spacewatch | THM | 3.5 km | MPC · JPL |
| 231034 | 2005 EG_{253} | — | March 10, 2005 | Siding Spring | SSS | · | 6.2 km | MPC · JPL |
| 231035 | 2005 EW_{253} | — | March 11, 2005 | Mount Lemmon | Mount Lemmon Survey | HYG | 3.3 km | MPC · JPL |
| 231036 | 2005 EY_{266} | — | March 13, 2005 | Kitt Peak | Spacewatch | HYG | 3.3 km | MPC · JPL |
| 231037 | 2005 ER_{275} | — | March 8, 2005 | Kitt Peak | Spacewatch | · | 3.8 km | MPC · JPL |
| 231038 | 2005 EJ_{279} | — | March 9, 2005 | Socorro | LINEAR | TIR | 3.6 km | MPC · JPL |
| 231039 | 2005 EL_{280} | — | March 10, 2005 | Catalina | CSS | · | 2.9 km | MPC · JPL |
| 231040 Kakaras | 2005 EX_{282} | Kakaras | March 10, 2005 | Moletai | K. Černis, Zdanavicius, J. | · | 6.0 km | MPC · JPL |
| 231041 | 2005 EB_{291} | — | March 10, 2005 | Catalina | CSS | · | 4.5 km | MPC · JPL |
| 231042 Johnhayes | 2005 EF_{296} | Johnhayes | March 9, 2005 | Kitt Peak | M. W. Buie | · | 2.7 km | MPC · JPL |
| 231043 | 2005 FV_{6} | — | March 30, 2005 | Catalina | CSS | · | 3.7 km | MPC · JPL |
| 231044 | 2005 GG_{2} | — | April 1, 2005 | Catalina | CSS | · | 4.9 km | MPC · JPL |
| 231045 | 2005 GJ_{4} | — | April 1, 2005 | Kitt Peak | Spacewatch | · | 5.4 km | MPC · JPL |
| 231046 | 2005 GZ_{29} | — | April 4, 2005 | Catalina | CSS | HYG | 4.4 km | MPC · JPL |
| 231047 | 2005 GM_{31} | — | April 4, 2005 | Catalina | CSS | · | 3.8 km | MPC · JPL |
| 231048 | 2005 GT_{34} | — | April 1, 2005 | Anderson Mesa | LONEOS | · | 2.8 km | MPC · JPL |
| 231049 | 2005 GP_{43} | — | April 5, 2005 | Palomar | NEAT | · | 5.9 km | MPC · JPL |
| 231050 | 2005 GH_{47} | — | April 5, 2005 | Mount Lemmon | Mount Lemmon Survey | · | 3.5 km | MPC · JPL |
| 231051 | 2005 GW_{60} | — | April 8, 2005 | Lulin | Lulin | · | 5.2 km | MPC · JPL |
| 231052 | 2005 GV_{68} | — | April 2, 2005 | Catalina | CSS | · | 5.5 km | MPC · JPL |
| 231053 | 2005 GT_{119} | — | April 11, 2005 | Kitt Peak | Spacewatch | H | 800 m | MPC · JPL |
| 231054 | 2005 GN_{220} | — | April 5, 2005 | Palomar | NEAT | · | 5.7 km | MPC · JPL |
| 231055 | 2005 GE_{222} | — | April 9, 2005 | Kitt Peak | Spacewatch | · | 4.7 km | MPC · JPL |
| 231056 | 2005 JG_{63} | — | May 3, 2005 | Kitt Peak | Deep Lens Survey | H | 880 m | MPC · JPL |
| 231057 | 2005 JG_{167} | — | May 12, 2005 | Catalina | CSS | · | 2.6 km | MPC · JPL |
| 231058 | 2005 LJ_{34} | — | June 10, 2005 | Kitt Peak | Spacewatch | · | 3.1 km | MPC · JPL |
| 231059 | 2005 NP_{7} | — | July 5, 2005 | Junk Bond | D. Healy | V | 830 m | MPC · JPL |
| 231060 | 2005 NM_{46} | — | July 5, 2005 | Mount Lemmon | Mount Lemmon Survey | MAS | 730 m | MPC · JPL |
| 231061 | 2005 NF_{67} | — | July 2, 2005 | Catalina | CSS | · | 1.0 km | MPC · JPL |
| 231062 | 2005 OY_{5} | — | July 28, 2005 | Palomar | NEAT | V | 920 m | MPC · JPL |
| 231063 | 2005 OC_{19} | — | July 31, 2005 | Palomar | NEAT | · | 1.0 km | MPC · JPL |
| 231064 | 2005 OF_{19} | — | July 31, 2005 | Palomar | NEAT | · | 1.4 km | MPC · JPL |
| 231065 | 2005 OG_{28} | — | July 30, 2005 | Palomar | NEAT | · | 1.1 km | MPC · JPL |
| 231066 | 2005 OR_{28} | — | July 31, 2005 | Palomar | NEAT | · | 1.8 km | MPC · JPL |
| 231067 | 2005 PD_{1} | — | August 1, 2005 | Siding Spring | SSS | V | 790 m | MPC · JPL |
| 231068 | 2005 PQ_{15} | — | August 4, 2005 | Palomar | NEAT | · | 880 m | MPC · JPL |
| 231069 | 2005 QN_{9} | — | August 25, 2005 | Palomar | NEAT | · | 1.3 km | MPC · JPL |
| 231070 | 2005 QN_{19} | — | August 25, 2005 | Campo Imperatore | CINEOS | · | 900 m | MPC · JPL |
| 231071 | 2005 QG_{22} | — | August 27, 2005 | Kitt Peak | Spacewatch | NYS | 1.4 km | MPC · JPL |
| 231072 | 2005 QK_{23} | — | August 27, 2005 | Anderson Mesa | LONEOS | NYS | 1.5 km | MPC · JPL |
| 231073 | 2005 QD_{37} | — | August 25, 2005 | Palomar | NEAT | · | 1.1 km | MPC · JPL |
| 231074 | 2005 QQ_{46} | — | August 26, 2005 | Haleakala | NEAT | V | 1.2 km | MPC · JPL |
| 231075 | 2005 QD_{50} | — | August 26, 2005 | Palomar | NEAT | (2076) | 1.3 km | MPC · JPL |
| 231076 | 2005 QJ_{50} | — | August 26, 2005 | Palomar | NEAT | · | 1.4 km | MPC · JPL |
| 231077 | 2005 QS_{50} | — | August 26, 2005 | Palomar | NEAT | · | 1.2 km | MPC · JPL |
| 231078 | 2005 QS_{51} | — | August 27, 2005 | Anderson Mesa | LONEOS | · | 1.8 km | MPC · JPL |
| 231079 | 2005 QY_{70} | — | August 29, 2005 | Socorro | LINEAR | · | 1.1 km | MPC · JPL |
| 231080 | 2005 QN_{80} | — | August 28, 2005 | Anderson Mesa | LONEOS | · | 1.5 km | MPC · JPL |
| 231081 | 2005 QT_{82} | — | August 29, 2005 | Anderson Mesa | LONEOS | · | 900 m | MPC · JPL |
| 231082 | 2005 QK_{96} | — | August 27, 2005 | Palomar | NEAT | · | 1.4 km | MPC · JPL |
| 231083 | 2005 QW_{113} | — | August 27, 2005 | Palomar | NEAT | · | 1.4 km | MPC · JPL |
| 231084 | 2005 QJ_{165} | — | August 31, 2005 | Palomar | NEAT | · | 1.8 km | MPC · JPL |
| 231085 | 2005 QX_{170} | — | August 29, 2005 | Palomar | NEAT | · | 1.4 km | MPC · JPL |
| 231086 | 2005 QA_{178} | — | August 31, 2005 | Palomar | NEAT | V | 960 m | MPC · JPL |
| 231087 | 2005 QO_{180} | — | August 28, 2005 | Kitt Peak | Spacewatch | · | 710 m | MPC · JPL |
| 231088 | 2005 RM_{8} | — | September 8, 2005 | Socorro | LINEAR | · | 1.0 km | MPC · JPL |
| 231089 | 2005 RZ_{10} | — | September 10, 2005 | Anderson Mesa | LONEOS | · | 1.0 km | MPC · JPL |
| 231090 | 2005 RJ_{11} | — | September 10, 2005 | Anderson Mesa | LONEOS | · | 1.3 km | MPC · JPL |
| 231091 | 2005 RQ_{14} | — | September 1, 2005 | Kitt Peak | Spacewatch | MAS | 660 m | MPC · JPL |
| 231092 | 2005 RB_{29} | — | September 12, 2005 | Haleakala | NEAT | · | 1.2 km | MPC · JPL |
| 231093 | 2005 RL_{31} | — | September 12, 2005 | Haleakala | NEAT | · | 1.6 km | MPC · JPL |
| 231094 | 2005 SO_{10} | — | September 26, 2005 | Catalina | CSS | (2076) | 1.4 km | MPC · JPL |
| 231095 | 2005 SK_{22} | — | September 23, 2005 | Kitt Peak | Spacewatch | · | 1.1 km | MPC · JPL |
| 231096 | 2005 SN_{23} | — | September 23, 2005 | Catalina | CSS | · | 1.4 km | MPC · JPL |
| 231097 | 2005 SB_{25} | — | September 25, 2005 | Catalina | CSS | · | 970 m | MPC · JPL |
| 231098 | 2005 SW_{26} | — | September 23, 2005 | Kitt Peak | Spacewatch | · | 770 m | MPC · JPL |
| 231099 | 2005 SQ_{31} | — | September 23, 2005 | Kitt Peak | Spacewatch | · | 1.2 km | MPC · JPL |
| 231100 | 2005 SF_{41} | — | September 24, 2005 | Kitt Peak | Spacewatch | · | 1.1 km | MPC · JPL |

== 231101–231200 ==
back to top

| Designation | | | Discovery | | | Properties | | Ref |
| Permanent | Provisional | Named after | Date | Site | Discoverer(s) | Category | Diam. | Ref |
|---|---|---|---|---|---|---|---|---|
| 231101 | 2005 SV_{50} | — | September 24, 2005 | Kitt Peak | Spacewatch | · | 2.3 km | MPC · JPL |
| 231102 | 2005 SZ_{69} | — | September 27, 2005 | Palomar | NEAT | · | 1.0 km | MPC · JPL |
| 231103 | 2005 SM_{70} | — | September 28, 2005 | Socorro | LINEAR | · | 1.1 km | MPC · JPL |
| 231104 | 2005 SF_{101} | — | September 25, 2005 | Kitt Peak | Spacewatch | · | 1.8 km | MPC · JPL |
| 231105 | 2005 SA_{102} | — | September 25, 2005 | Kitt Peak | Spacewatch | V | 1.1 km | MPC · JPL |
| 231106 | 2005 SZ_{116} | — | September 28, 2005 | Palomar | NEAT | · | 1.1 km | MPC · JPL |
| 231107 | 2005 SO_{117} | — | September 28, 2005 | Palomar | NEAT | · | 1.1 km | MPC · JPL |
| 231108 | 2005 SR_{124} | — | September 29, 2005 | Kitt Peak | Spacewatch | V | 870 m | MPC · JPL |
| 231109 | 2005 SB_{131} | — | September 29, 2005 | Mount Lemmon | Mount Lemmon Survey | · | 1.0 km | MPC · JPL |
| 231110 | 2005 SV_{132} | — | September 29, 2005 | Kitt Peak | Spacewatch | MAS | 780 m | MPC · JPL |
| 231111 | 2005 SD_{144} | — | September 25, 2005 | Kitt Peak | Spacewatch | · | 1.3 km | MPC · JPL |
| 231112 | 2005 SU_{147} | — | September 25, 2005 | Kitt Peak | Spacewatch | · | 1.1 km | MPC · JPL |
| 231113 | 2005 SA_{153} | — | September 25, 2005 | Kitt Peak | Spacewatch | · | 1.6 km | MPC · JPL |
| 231114 | 2005 SU_{156} | — | September 26, 2005 | Kitt Peak | Spacewatch | · | 1.6 km | MPC · JPL |
| 231115 | 2005 ST_{161} | — | September 27, 2005 | Kitt Peak | Spacewatch | NYS | 1.3 km | MPC · JPL |
| 231116 | 2005 SQ_{164} | — | September 27, 2005 | Palomar | NEAT | V | 1.0 km | MPC · JPL |
| 231117 | 2005 SX_{187} | — | September 29, 2005 | Anderson Mesa | LONEOS | · | 1.1 km | MPC · JPL |
| 231118 | 2005 SY_{191} | — | September 29, 2005 | Mount Lemmon | Mount Lemmon Survey | · | 1.3 km | MPC · JPL |
| 231119 | 2005 SN_{193} | — | September 29, 2005 | Kitt Peak | Spacewatch | · | 1.3 km | MPC · JPL |
| 231120 | 2005 SF_{209} | — | September 30, 2005 | Palomar | NEAT | MAR | 1.1 km | MPC · JPL |
| 231121 | 2005 SA_{213} | — | September 30, 2005 | Mount Lemmon | Mount Lemmon Survey | · | 1.8 km | MPC · JPL |
| 231122 | 2005 SY_{214} | — | September 30, 2005 | Catalina | CSS | · | 3.2 km | MPC · JPL |
| 231123 | 2005 SD_{216} | — | September 30, 2005 | Palomar | NEAT | MAS | 910 m | MPC · JPL |
| 231124 | 2005 SH_{231} | — | September 30, 2005 | Mount Lemmon | Mount Lemmon Survey | MAS | 850 m | MPC · JPL |
| 231125 | 2005 SP_{232} | — | September 30, 2005 | Mount Lemmon | Mount Lemmon Survey | · | 1.3 km | MPC · JPL |
| 231126 | 2005 SC_{234} | — | September 29, 2005 | Kitt Peak | Spacewatch | · | 930 m | MPC · JPL |
| 231127 | 2005 SX_{245} | — | September 30, 2005 | Mount Lemmon | Mount Lemmon Survey | · | 890 m | MPC · JPL |
| 231128 | 2005 SM_{251} | — | September 24, 2005 | Palomar | NEAT | · | 1.4 km | MPC · JPL |
| 231129 | 2005 SN_{259} | — | September 25, 2005 | Catalina | CSS | · | 1.1 km | MPC · JPL |
| 231130 | 2005 SG_{264} | — | September 24, 2005 | Kitt Peak | Spacewatch | fast | 2.3 km | MPC · JPL |
| 231131 | 2005 SM_{278} | — | September 24, 2005 | Kitt Peak | Spacewatch | · | 1.4 km | MPC · JPL |
| 231132 | 2005 TV_{13} | — | October 1, 2005 | Goodricke-Pigott | R. A. Tucker | · | 1.4 km | MPC · JPL |
| 231133 | 2005 TW_{40} | — | October 1, 2005 | Mount Lemmon | Mount Lemmon Survey | · | 2.1 km | MPC · JPL |
| 231134 | 2005 TU_{45} | — | October 5, 2005 | Mauna Kea | D. J. Tholen | APO +1km | 1.3 km | MPC · JPL |
| 231135 | 2005 TE_{48} | — | October 6, 2005 | Catalina | CSS | · | 990 m | MPC · JPL |
| 231136 | 2005 TV_{71} | — | October 3, 2005 | Catalina | CSS | · | 1.1 km | MPC · JPL |
| 231137 | 2005 TM_{77} | — | October 6, 2005 | Catalina | CSS | NYS | 1.3 km | MPC · JPL |
| 231138 | 2005 TA_{104} | — | October 8, 2005 | Socorro | LINEAR | · | 1.2 km | MPC · JPL |
| 231139 | 2005 TF_{131} | — | October 7, 2005 | Kitt Peak | Spacewatch | NYS | 1.2 km | MPC · JPL |
| 231140 | 2005 TJ_{135} | — | October 5, 2005 | Kitt Peak | Spacewatch | · | 1.9 km | MPC · JPL |
| 231141 | 2005 TJ_{141} | — | October 8, 2005 | Kitt Peak | Spacewatch | · | 800 m | MPC · JPL |
| 231142 | 2005 TC_{151} | — | October 8, 2005 | Kitt Peak | Spacewatch | · | 850 m | MPC · JPL |
| 231143 | 2005 TP_{159} | — | October 9, 2005 | Kitt Peak | Spacewatch | · | 1.4 km | MPC · JPL |
| 231144 | 2005 UE_{4} | — | October 24, 2005 | Goodricke-Pigott | R. A. Tucker | · | 1.2 km | MPC · JPL |
| 231145 | 2005 UF_{4} | — | October 24, 2005 | Goodricke-Pigott | R. A. Tucker | MAS | 1 km | MPC · JPL |
| 231146 | 2005 UT_{14} | — | October 22, 2005 | Kitt Peak | Spacewatch | · | 1.4 km | MPC · JPL |
| 231147 | 2005 UH_{15} | — | October 22, 2005 | Kitt Peak | Spacewatch | MAS | 710 m | MPC · JPL |
| 231148 | 2005 UX_{15} | — | October 22, 2005 | Kitt Peak | Spacewatch | · | 1.0 km | MPC · JPL |
| 231149 | 2005 UV_{16} | — | October 22, 2005 | Kitt Peak | Spacewatch | · | 1.3 km | MPC · JPL |
| 231150 | 2005 UJ_{29} | — | October 23, 2005 | Catalina | CSS | · | 1.5 km | MPC · JPL |
| 231151 | 2005 UR_{41} | — | October 27, 2005 | Cordell-Lorenz | D. T. Durig | NYS | 1.6 km | MPC · JPL |
| 231152 | 2005 UM_{44} | — | October 22, 2005 | Kitt Peak | Spacewatch | · | 1.0 km | MPC · JPL |
| 231153 | 2005 UK_{48} | — | October 22, 2005 | Kitt Peak | Spacewatch | V | 850 m | MPC · JPL |
| 231154 | 2005 UQ_{48} | — | October 22, 2005 | Kitt Peak | Spacewatch | · | 2.4 km | MPC · JPL |
| 231155 | 2005 UF_{51} | — | October 23, 2005 | Catalina | CSS | (5) | 1.8 km | MPC · JPL |
| 231156 | 2005 UF_{61} | — | October 25, 2005 | Catalina | CSS | (883) | 1.1 km | MPC · JPL |
| 231157 | 2005 UO_{63} | — | October 25, 2005 | Mount Lemmon | Mount Lemmon Survey | (5) | 1.1 km | MPC · JPL |
| 231158 | 2005 UW_{66} | — | October 22, 2005 | Palomar | NEAT | · | 1.8 km | MPC · JPL |
| 231159 | 2005 UG_{68} | — | October 22, 2005 | Palomar | NEAT | V | 1.1 km | MPC · JPL |
| 231160 | 2005 UV_{68} | — | October 23, 2005 | Palomar | NEAT | · | 1.4 km | MPC · JPL |
| 231161 | 2005 UT_{73} | — | October 23, 2005 | Palomar | NEAT | NYS | 1.8 km | MPC · JPL |
| 231162 | 2005 UU_{73} | — | October 23, 2005 | Palomar | NEAT | NYS | 1.5 km | MPC · JPL |
| 231163 | 2005 UJ_{76} | — | October 24, 2005 | Palomar | NEAT | · | 1.8 km | MPC · JPL |
| 231164 | 2005 UZ_{78} | — | October 25, 2005 | Catalina | CSS | NYS | 1.4 km | MPC · JPL |
| 231165 | 2005 UA_{79} | — | October 25, 2005 | Catalina | CSS | · | 1.3 km | MPC · JPL |
| 231166 | 2005 UX_{102} | — | October 22, 2005 | Kitt Peak | Spacewatch | · | 2.6 km | MPC · JPL |
| 231167 | 2005 UB_{106} | — | October 22, 2005 | Kitt Peak | Spacewatch | · | 1.2 km | MPC · JPL |
| 231168 | 2005 UB_{109} | — | October 22, 2005 | Palomar | NEAT | · | 1.2 km | MPC · JPL |
| 231169 | 2005 UT_{113} | — | October 22, 2005 | Kitt Peak | Spacewatch | · | 1.1 km | MPC · JPL |
| 231170 | 2005 UA_{122} | — | October 24, 2005 | Kitt Peak | Spacewatch | · | 1.7 km | MPC · JPL |
| 231171 | 2005 UQ_{142} | — | October 25, 2005 | Mount Lemmon | Mount Lemmon Survey | MAS | 780 m | MPC · JPL |
| 231172 | 2005 UZ_{143} | — | October 26, 2005 | Kitt Peak | Spacewatch | · | 770 m | MPC · JPL |
| 231173 | 2005 UX_{152} | — | October 26, 2005 | Kitt Peak | Spacewatch | · | 2.2 km | MPC · JPL |
| 231174 | 2005 UH_{153} | — | October 26, 2005 | Kitt Peak | Spacewatch | NYS | 1.2 km | MPC · JPL |
| 231175 | 2005 UG_{160} | — | October 22, 2005 | Catalina | CSS | · | 930 m | MPC · JPL |
| 231176 | 2005 UU_{170} | — | October 24, 2005 | Kitt Peak | Spacewatch | · | 1.3 km | MPC · JPL |
| 231177 | 2005 UK_{194} | — | October 22, 2005 | Kitt Peak | Spacewatch | MAS | 840 m | MPC · JPL |
| 231178 | 2005 UX_{206} | — | October 27, 2005 | Kitt Peak | Spacewatch | MAS | 760 m | MPC · JPL |
| 231179 | 2005 UQ_{214} | — | October 27, 2005 | Palomar | NEAT | · | 1.4 km | MPC · JPL |
| 231180 | 2005 UU_{215} | — | October 25, 2005 | Kitt Peak | Spacewatch | NYS | 1.4 km | MPC · JPL |
| 231181 | 2005 UX_{226} | — | October 25, 2005 | Kitt Peak | Spacewatch | KON | 3.0 km | MPC · JPL |
| 231182 | 2005 UF_{230} | — | October 25, 2005 | Kitt Peak | Spacewatch | · | 850 m | MPC · JPL |
| 231183 | 2005 UO_{230} | — | October 25, 2005 | Catalina | CSS | · | 1.4 km | MPC · JPL |
| 231184 | 2005 UL_{252} | — | October 26, 2005 | Kitt Peak | Spacewatch | · | 1.7 km | MPC · JPL |
| 231185 | 2005 UZ_{263} | — | October 27, 2005 | Kitt Peak | Spacewatch | · | 970 m | MPC · JPL |
| 231186 | 2005 UH_{273} | — | October 28, 2005 | Mount Lemmon | Mount Lemmon Survey | · | 1.5 km | MPC · JPL |
| 231187 | 2005 UG_{305} | — | October 26, 2005 | Kitt Peak | Spacewatch | V | 780 m | MPC · JPL |
| 231188 | 2005 UR_{354} | — | October 29, 2005 | Catalina | CSS | · | 2.6 km | MPC · JPL |
| 231189 | 2005 UH_{360} | — | October 25, 2005 | Kitt Peak | Spacewatch | · | 3.4 km | MPC · JPL |
| 231190 | 2005 UO_{368} | — | October 27, 2005 | Kitt Peak | Spacewatch | · | 1.8 km | MPC · JPL |
| 231191 | 2005 UW_{420} | — | October 25, 2005 | Mount Lemmon | Mount Lemmon Survey | · | 1.6 km | MPC · JPL |
| 231192 | 2005 UU_{432} | — | October 28, 2005 | Mount Lemmon | Mount Lemmon Survey | MAS | 670 m | MPC · JPL |
| 231193 | 2005 UL_{444} | — | October 30, 2005 | Mount Lemmon | Mount Lemmon Survey | · | 1.6 km | MPC · JPL |
| 231194 | 2005 UB_{445} | — | October 31, 2005 | Anderson Mesa | LONEOS | · | 910 m | MPC · JPL |
| 231195 | 2005 UL_{448} | — | October 30, 2005 | Socorro | LINEAR | · | 1.3 km | MPC · JPL |
| 231196 | 2005 UC_{451} | — | October 27, 2005 | Mount Lemmon | Mount Lemmon Survey | · | 1.3 km | MPC · JPL |
| 231197 | 2005 UL_{482} | — | October 22, 2005 | Anderson Mesa | LONEOS | · | 1.1 km | MPC · JPL |
| 231198 | 2005 UF_{492} | — | October 24, 2005 | Palomar | NEAT | V | 820 m | MPC · JPL |
| 231199 | 2005 UO_{505} | — | October 24, 2005 | Mauna Kea | D. J. Tholen | · | 2.7 km | MPC · JPL |
| 231200 | 2005 UZ_{505} | — | October 24, 2005 | Mauna Kea | D. J. Tholen | · | 2.6 km | MPC · JPL |

== 231201–231300 ==
back to top

| Designation | | | Discovery | | | Properties | | Ref |
| Permanent | Provisional | Named after | Date | Site | Discoverer(s) | Category | Diam. | Ref |
|---|---|---|---|---|---|---|---|---|
| 231201 | 2005 UH_{511} | — | October 27, 2005 | Catalina | CSS | V | 820 m | MPC · JPL |
| 231202 | 2005 VF_{42} | — | November 3, 2005 | Catalina | CSS | (2076) | 1.5 km | MPC · JPL |
| 231203 | 2005 VR_{42} | — | November 3, 2005 | Mount Lemmon | Mount Lemmon Survey | · | 1.6 km | MPC · JPL |
| 231204 | 2005 VV_{42} | — | November 4, 2005 | Mount Lemmon | Mount Lemmon Survey | · | 2.4 km | MPC · JPL |
| 231205 | 2005 VR_{49} | — | November 2, 2005 | Socorro | LINEAR | · | 1.1 km | MPC · JPL |
| 231206 | 2005 VH_{99} | — | November 10, 2005 | Catalina | CSS | · | 2.9 km | MPC · JPL |
| 231207 | 2005 VW_{119} | — | November 4, 2005 | Kitt Peak | Spacewatch | · | 2.9 km | MPC · JPL |
| 231208 | 2005 VB_{124} | — | November 3, 2005 | Mount Lemmon | Mount Lemmon Survey | · | 1.6 km | MPC · JPL |
| 231209 | 2005 WD_{32} | — | November 21, 2005 | Kitt Peak | Spacewatch | · | 1.5 km | MPC · JPL |
| 231210 | 2005 WQ_{33} | — | November 21, 2005 | Kitt Peak | Spacewatch | · | 1.5 km | MPC · JPL |
| 231211 | 2005 WA_{36} | — | November 22, 2005 | Kitt Peak | Spacewatch | · | 1.6 km | MPC · JPL |
| 231212 | 2005 WK_{57} | — | November 30, 2005 | Mayhill | Lowe, A. | · | 1.3 km | MPC · JPL |
| 231213 | 2005 WX_{87} | — | November 28, 2005 | Mount Lemmon | Mount Lemmon Survey | · | 1.8 km | MPC · JPL |
| 231214 | 2005 WD_{89} | — | November 25, 2005 | Mount Lemmon | Mount Lemmon Survey | V | 960 m | MPC · JPL |
| 231215 | 2005 WU_{93} | — | November 26, 2005 | Mount Lemmon | Mount Lemmon Survey | NYS | 1.5 km | MPC · JPL |
| 231216 | 2005 WM_{96} | — | November 26, 2005 | Kitt Peak | Spacewatch | MAS | 990 m | MPC · JPL |
| 231217 | 2005 WW_{126} | — | November 25, 2005 | Catalina | CSS | · | 1.2 km | MPC · JPL |
| 231218 | 2005 WY_{136} | — | November 26, 2005 | Mount Lemmon | Mount Lemmon Survey | NYS | 1.0 km | MPC · JPL |
| 231219 | 2005 WW_{149} | — | November 28, 2005 | Kitt Peak | Spacewatch | · | 1.5 km | MPC · JPL |
| 231220 | 2005 WS_{155} | — | November 29, 2005 | Socorro | LINEAR | · | 1.7 km | MPC · JPL |
| 231221 | 2005 WM_{157} | — | November 25, 2005 | Mount Lemmon | Mount Lemmon Survey | · | 2.0 km | MPC · JPL |
| 231222 | 2005 WR_{157} | — | November 25, 2005 | Mount Lemmon | Mount Lemmon Survey | · | 2.7 km | MPC · JPL |
| 231223 | 2005 WD_{159} | — | November 28, 2005 | Catalina | CSS | · | 1.7 km | MPC · JPL |
| 231224 | 2005 WW_{159} | — | November 30, 2005 | Kitt Peak | Spacewatch | NYS | 1.6 km | MPC · JPL |
| 231225 | 2005 WS_{171} | — | November 30, 2005 | Kitt Peak | Spacewatch | MAS | 910 m | MPC · JPL |
| 231226 | 2005 WZ_{174} | — | November 30, 2005 | Kitt Peak | Spacewatch | · | 2.6 km | MPC · JPL |
| 231227 | 2005 WZ_{177} | — | November 30, 2005 | Kitt Peak | Spacewatch | NYS | 1.5 km | MPC · JPL |
| 231228 | 2005 WV_{188} | — | November 30, 2005 | Socorro | LINEAR | · | 2.5 km | MPC · JPL |
| 231229 | 2005 WE_{196} | — | November 29, 2005 | Mount Lemmon | Mount Lemmon Survey | · | 2.0 km | MPC · JPL |
| 231230 | 2005 XA_{3} | — | December 1, 2005 | Socorro | LINEAR | MAS | 840 m | MPC · JPL |
| 231231 | 2005 XC_{12} | — | December 1, 2005 | Mount Lemmon | Mount Lemmon Survey | · | 1.1 km | MPC · JPL |
| 231232 | 2005 XB_{25} | — | December 3, 2005 | Kitt Peak | Spacewatch | · | 2.6 km | MPC · JPL |
| 231233 | 2005 XZ_{37} | — | December 4, 2005 | Kitt Peak | Spacewatch | · | 3.0 km | MPC · JPL |
| 231234 | 2005 XN_{38} | — | December 4, 2005 | Kitt Peak | Spacewatch | WIT | 1.7 km | MPC · JPL |
| 231235 | 2005 XR_{41} | — | December 7, 2005 | Socorro | LINEAR | · | 3.0 km | MPC · JPL |
| 231236 | 2005 XK_{54} | — | December 5, 2005 | Kitt Peak | Spacewatch | MAS | 860 m | MPC · JPL |
| 231237 | 2005 XW_{84} | — | December 10, 2005 | Kitt Peak | Spacewatch | · | 2.0 km | MPC · JPL |
| 231238 | 2005 YB_{7} | — | December 21, 2005 | Catalina | CSS | · | 2.9 km | MPC · JPL |
| 231239 | 2005 YK_{9} | — | December 21, 2005 | Kitt Peak | Spacewatch | NYS | 1.1 km | MPC · JPL |
| 231240 | 2005 YS_{25} | — | December 24, 2005 | Kitt Peak | Spacewatch | NYS | 1.6 km | MPC · JPL |
| 231241 | 2005 YW_{35} | — | December 25, 2005 | Kitt Peak | Spacewatch | V | 1.0 km | MPC · JPL |
| 231242 | 2005 YW_{47} | — | December 26, 2005 | Kitt Peak | Spacewatch | · | 1.7 km | MPC · JPL |
| 231243 | 2005 YJ_{50} | — | December 25, 2005 | Anderson Mesa | LONEOS | · | 2.7 km | MPC · JPL |
| 231244 | 2005 YW_{63} | — | December 24, 2005 | Kitt Peak | Spacewatch | · | 1.9 km | MPC · JPL |
| 231245 | 2005 YL_{116} | — | December 25, 2005 | Kitt Peak | Spacewatch | · | 2.3 km | MPC · JPL |
| 231246 | 2005 YN_{124} | — | December 26, 2005 | Kitt Peak | Spacewatch | · | 2.2 km | MPC · JPL |
| 231247 | 2005 YB_{131} | — | December 25, 2005 | Mount Lemmon | Mount Lemmon Survey | · | 3.3 km | MPC · JPL |
| 231248 | 2005 YJ_{131} | — | December 25, 2005 | Mount Lemmon | Mount Lemmon Survey | · | 1.3 km | MPC · JPL |
| 231249 | 2005 YO_{138} | — | December 26, 2005 | Kitt Peak | Spacewatch | V | 950 m | MPC · JPL |
| 231250 | 2005 YK_{141} | — | December 28, 2005 | Mount Lemmon | Mount Lemmon Survey | · | 4.1 km | MPC · JPL |
| 231251 | 2005 YN_{145} | — | December 29, 2005 | Socorro | LINEAR | · | 1.9 km | MPC · JPL |
| 231252 | 2005 YV_{152} | — | December 28, 2005 | Catalina | CSS | · | 2.2 km | MPC · JPL |
| 231253 | 2005 YX_{152} | — | December 28, 2005 | Catalina | CSS | EUN | 1.9 km | MPC · JPL |
| 231254 | 2005 YT_{158} | — | December 27, 2005 | Kitt Peak | Spacewatch | · | 3.0 km | MPC · JPL |
| 231255 | 2005 YL_{168} | — | December 29, 2005 | Kitt Peak | Spacewatch | · | 3.0 km | MPC · JPL |
| 231256 | 2005 YX_{191} | — | December 30, 2005 | Kitt Peak | Spacewatch | · | 1.7 km | MPC · JPL |
| 231257 | 2005 YE_{196} | — | December 25, 2005 | Catalina | CSS | BAR | 1.8 km | MPC · JPL |
| 231258 | 2005 YS_{199} | — | December 25, 2005 | Mount Lemmon | Mount Lemmon Survey | EUN | 2.0 km | MPC · JPL |
| 231259 | 2005 YW_{203} | — | December 25, 2005 | Mount Lemmon | Mount Lemmon Survey | · | 2.0 km | MPC · JPL |
| 231260 | 2005 YB_{211} | — | December 25, 2005 | Catalina | CSS | EUN | 2.1 km | MPC · JPL |
| 231261 | 2005 YM_{229} | — | December 25, 2005 | Kitt Peak | Spacewatch | · | 2.5 km | MPC · JPL |
| 231262 | 2005 YZ_{274} | — | December 25, 2005 | Catalina | CSS | · | 3.8 km | MPC · JPL |
| 231263 | 2005 YD_{275} | — | December 25, 2005 | Catalina | CSS | · | 4.2 km | MPC · JPL |
| 231264 | 2005 YJ_{289} | — | December 31, 2005 | Kitt Peak | Spacewatch | CLA | 2.6 km | MPC · JPL |
| 231265 Saulperlmutter | 2006 AS_{4} | Saulperlmutter | January 5, 2006 | Vallemare Borbona | V. S. Casulli | · | 2.5 km | MPC · JPL |
| 231266 | 2006 AW_{13} | — | January 5, 2006 | Mount Lemmon | Mount Lemmon Survey | · | 2.4 km | MPC · JPL |
| 231267 | 2006 AM_{16} | — | January 4, 2006 | Mount Lemmon | Mount Lemmon Survey | EUN | 1.8 km | MPC · JPL |
| 231268 | 2006 AG_{21} | — | January 5, 2006 | Catalina | CSS | EUN | 2.1 km | MPC · JPL |
| 231269 | 2006 AO_{21} | — | January 5, 2006 | Catalina | CSS | · | 3.4 km | MPC · JPL |
| 231270 | 2006 AF_{31} | — | January 5, 2006 | Kitt Peak | Spacewatch | · | 2.7 km | MPC · JPL |
| 231271 | 2006 AO_{42} | — | January 6, 2006 | Kitt Peak | Spacewatch | · | 3.3 km | MPC · JPL |
| 231272 | 2006 AK_{46} | — | January 5, 2006 | Kitt Peak | Spacewatch | · | 1.6 km | MPC · JPL |
| 231273 | 2006 AU_{63} | — | January 7, 2006 | Kitt Peak | Spacewatch | · | 1.4 km | MPC · JPL |
| 231274 | 2006 AY_{68} | — | January 6, 2006 | Kitt Peak | Spacewatch | · | 1.3 km | MPC · JPL |
| 231275 | 2006 AP_{71} | — | January 6, 2006 | Mount Lemmon | Mount Lemmon Survey | · | 1.3 km | MPC · JPL |
| 231276 | 2006 AL_{85} | — | January 7, 2006 | Anderson Mesa | LONEOS | · | 2.1 km | MPC · JPL |
| 231277 | 2006 BC_{13} | — | January 21, 2006 | Mount Lemmon | Mount Lemmon Survey | (5) | 1.2 km | MPC · JPL |
| 231278 Kárpáti | 2006 BY_{26} | Kárpáti | January 25, 2006 | Piszkéstető | K. Sárneczky | EUN | 1.4 km | MPC · JPL |
| 231279 | 2006 BV_{27} | — | January 22, 2006 | Mount Lemmon | Mount Lemmon Survey | · | 2.2 km | MPC · JPL |
| 231280 | 2006 BT_{31} | — | January 20, 2006 | Kitt Peak | Spacewatch | · | 1.9 km | MPC · JPL |
| 231281 | 2006 BW_{32} | — | January 21, 2006 | Kitt Peak | Spacewatch | · | 2.0 km | MPC · JPL |
| 231282 | 2006 BF_{44} | — | January 23, 2006 | Junk Bond | D. Healy | · | 2.2 km | MPC · JPL |
| 231283 | 2006 BZ_{45} | — | January 23, 2006 | Mount Lemmon | Mount Lemmon Survey | · | 1.6 km | MPC · JPL |
| 231284 | 2006 BL_{57} | — | January 23, 2006 | Kitt Peak | Spacewatch | · | 1.5 km | MPC · JPL |
| 231285 | 2006 BJ_{58} | — | January 23, 2006 | Kitt Peak | Spacewatch | EUN | 1.8 km | MPC · JPL |
| 231286 | 2006 BN_{58} | — | January 23, 2006 | Kitt Peak | Spacewatch | · | 3.2 km | MPC · JPL |
| 231287 | 2006 BW_{60} | — | January 19, 2006 | Catalina | CSS | · | 1.4 km | MPC · JPL |
| 231288 | 2006 BZ_{80} | — | January 23, 2006 | Kitt Peak | Spacewatch | · | 1.7 km | MPC · JPL |
| 231289 | 2006 BK_{95} | — | January 26, 2006 | Kitt Peak | Spacewatch | MIS | 2.2 km | MPC · JPL |
| 231290 | 2006 BK_{99} | — | January 25, 2006 | Junk Bond | D. Healy | · | 1.8 km | MPC · JPL |
| 231291 | 2006 BZ_{102} | — | January 23, 2006 | Mount Lemmon | Mount Lemmon Survey | MAR | 1.7 km | MPC · JPL |
| 231292 | 2006 BZ_{107} | — | January 25, 2006 | Kitt Peak | Spacewatch | · | 2.6 km | MPC · JPL |
| 231293 | 2006 BL_{117} | — | January 26, 2006 | Kitt Peak | Spacewatch | · | 2.4 km | MPC · JPL |
| 231294 | 2006 BF_{124} | — | January 26, 2006 | Kitt Peak | Spacewatch | · | 2.3 km | MPC · JPL |
| 231295 | 2006 BM_{126} | — | January 26, 2006 | Kitt Peak | Spacewatch | · | 3.5 km | MPC · JPL |
| 231296 | 2006 BD_{128} | — | January 26, 2006 | Kitt Peak | Spacewatch | MIS | 3.4 km | MPC · JPL |
| 231297 | 2006 BT_{141} | — | January 25, 2006 | Kitt Peak | Spacewatch | · | 1.9 km | MPC · JPL |
| 231298 | 2006 BQ_{144} | — | January 23, 2006 | Catalina | CSS | EUN | 2.0 km | MPC · JPL |
| 231299 | 2006 BH_{145} | — | January 23, 2006 | Catalina | CSS | · | 3.2 km | MPC · JPL |
| 231300 | 2006 BF_{159} | — | January 26, 2006 | Kitt Peak | Spacewatch | BRG | 1.8 km | MPC · JPL |

== 231301–231400 ==
back to top

| Designation | | | Discovery | | | Properties | | Ref |
| Permanent | Provisional | Named after | Date | Site | Discoverer(s) | Category | Diam. | Ref |
|---|---|---|---|---|---|---|---|---|
| 231301 | 2006 BU_{161} | — | January 26, 2006 | Anderson Mesa | LONEOS | ADE | 4.5 km | MPC · JPL |
| 231302 | 2006 BM_{165} | — | January 26, 2006 | Mount Lemmon | Mount Lemmon Survey | · | 2.4 km | MPC · JPL |
| 231303 | 2006 BV_{167} | — | January 26, 2006 | Mount Lemmon | Mount Lemmon Survey | EOS | 2.9 km | MPC · JPL |
| 231304 | 2006 BK_{168} | — | January 26, 2006 | Catalina | CSS | RAF | 1.5 km | MPC · JPL |
| 231305 | 2006 BK_{169} | — | January 26, 2006 | Mount Lemmon | Mount Lemmon Survey | AST | 2.0 km | MPC · JPL |
| 231306 | 2006 BQ_{178} | — | January 27, 2006 | Mount Lemmon | Mount Lemmon Survey | · | 1.8 km | MPC · JPL |
| 231307 Peterfalk | 2006 BD_{186} | Peterfalk | January 28, 2006 | Nogales | J.-C. Merlin | KOR | 1.5 km | MPC · JPL |
| 231308 | 2006 BD_{190} | — | January 28, 2006 | Kitt Peak | Spacewatch | · | 1.3 km | MPC · JPL |
| 231309 | 2006 BK_{190} | — | January 28, 2006 | Kitt Peak | Spacewatch | · | 3.3 km | MPC · JPL |
| 231310 | 2006 BC_{191} | — | January 28, 2006 | Mount Lemmon | Mount Lemmon Survey | · | 3.1 km | MPC · JPL |
| 231311 | 2006 BN_{214} | — | January 23, 2006 | Socorro | LINEAR | · | 1.8 km | MPC · JPL |
| 231312 | 2006 BH_{255} | — | January 31, 2006 | Kitt Peak | Spacewatch | · | 2.3 km | MPC · JPL |
| 231313 | 2006 BH_{263} | — | January 31, 2006 | Kitt Peak | Spacewatch | · | 1.5 km | MPC · JPL |
| 231314 | 2006 BV_{267} | — | January 26, 2006 | Catalina | CSS | · | 2.1 km | MPC · JPL |
| 231315 | 2006 BU_{268} | — | January 27, 2006 | Catalina | CSS | · | 3.2 km | MPC · JPL |
| 231316 | 2006 BP_{281} | — | January 23, 2006 | Kitt Peak | Spacewatch | · | 2.3 km | MPC · JPL |
| 231317 | 2006 CW_{5} | — | February 1, 2006 | Mount Lemmon | Mount Lemmon Survey | · | 1.4 km | MPC · JPL |
| 231318 | 2006 CO_{40} | — | February 2, 2006 | Mount Lemmon | Mount Lemmon Survey | · | 2.4 km | MPC · JPL |
| 231319 | 2006 CQ_{41} | — | February 2, 2006 | Kitt Peak | Spacewatch | · | 2.2 km | MPC · JPL |
| 231320 | 2006 CM_{55} | — | February 4, 2006 | Mount Lemmon | Mount Lemmon Survey | · | 2.0 km | MPC · JPL |
| 231321 | 2006 CL_{57} | — | February 4, 2006 | Kitt Peak | Spacewatch | · | 2.2 km | MPC · JPL |
| 231322 | 2006 DF_{1} | — | February 21, 2006 | Calvin-Rehoboth | L. A. Molnar | · | 2.4 km | MPC · JPL |
| 231323 | 2006 DM_{2} | — | February 20, 2006 | Kitt Peak | Spacewatch | (12739) | 2.0 km | MPC · JPL |
| 231324 | 2006 DQ_{3} | — | February 20, 2006 | Catalina | CSS | · | 2.3 km | MPC · JPL |
| 231325 | 2006 DR_{7} | — | February 20, 2006 | Catalina | CSS | · | 4.7 km | MPC · JPL |
| 231326 | 2006 DC_{8} | — | February 20, 2006 | Kitt Peak | Spacewatch | · | 2.4 km | MPC · JPL |
| 231327 | 2006 DE_{33} | — | February 20, 2006 | Kitt Peak | Spacewatch | · | 2.5 km | MPC · JPL |
| 231328 | 2006 DW_{38} | — | February 21, 2006 | Mount Lemmon | Mount Lemmon Survey | · | 2.8 km | MPC · JPL |
| 231329 | 2006 DF_{53} | — | February 24, 2006 | Kitt Peak | Spacewatch | · | 1.8 km | MPC · JPL |
| 231330 | 2006 DE_{66} | — | February 21, 2006 | Catalina | CSS | JUN | 1.5 km | MPC · JPL |
| 231331 | 2006 DV_{86} | — | February 24, 2006 | Kitt Peak | Spacewatch | · | 4.3 km | MPC · JPL |
| 231332 | 2006 DY_{144} | — | February 25, 2006 | Mount Lemmon | Mount Lemmon Survey | HOF | 2.6 km | MPC · JPL |
| 231333 | 2006 DO_{179} | — | February 27, 2006 | Mount Lemmon | Mount Lemmon Survey | HOF | 4.1 km | MPC · JPL |
| 231334 | 2006 DJ_{184} | — | February 27, 2006 | Kitt Peak | Spacewatch | · | 2.9 km | MPC · JPL |
| 231335 | 2006 DF_{195} | — | February 28, 2006 | Catalina | CSS | · | 3.5 km | MPC · JPL |
| 231336 | 2006 DL_{197} | — | February 24, 2006 | Catalina | CSS | · | 1.6 km | MPC · JPL |
| 231337 | 2006 DE_{198} | — | February 25, 2006 | Anderson Mesa | LONEOS | · | 3.1 km | MPC · JPL |
| 231338 | 2006 DW_{200} | — | February 25, 2006 | Anderson Mesa | LONEOS | ADE | 3.4 km | MPC · JPL |
| 231339 | 2006 DS_{201} | — | February 18, 2006 | Anderson Mesa | LONEOS | · | 3.9 km | MPC · JPL |
| 231340 | 2006 DS_{207} | — | February 25, 2006 | Mount Lemmon | Mount Lemmon Survey | · | 2.8 km | MPC · JPL |
| 231341 | 2006 DP_{208} | — | February 25, 2006 | Kitt Peak | Spacewatch | NEM | 3.1 km | MPC · JPL |
| 231342 | 2006 EL_{25} | — | March 3, 2006 | Kitt Peak | Spacewatch | (29841) | 1.6 km | MPC · JPL |
| 231343 | 2006 EF_{32} | — | March 3, 2006 | Mount Lemmon | Mount Lemmon Survey | · | 2.8 km | MPC · JPL |
| 231344 | 2006 EZ_{49} | — | March 4, 2006 | Kitt Peak | Spacewatch | · | 2.6 km | MPC · JPL |
| 231345 | 2006 EE_{52} | — | March 4, 2006 | Kitt Peak | Spacewatch | · | 2.5 km | MPC · JPL |
| 231346 Taofanlin | 2006 EL_{67} | Taofanlin | March 10, 2006 | Lulin | Lin, H.-C., Q. Ye | · | 2.4 km | MPC · JPL |
| 231347 | 2006 FE_{7} | — | March 23, 2006 | Kitt Peak | Spacewatch | · | 3.1 km | MPC · JPL |
| 231348 | 2006 FR_{15} | — | March 23, 2006 | Kitt Peak | Spacewatch | TRE | 3.9 km | MPC · JPL |
| 231349 | 2006 FV_{15} | — | March 23, 2006 | Mount Lemmon | Mount Lemmon Survey | AGN | 1.7 km | MPC · JPL |
| 231350 | 2006 FC_{26} | — | March 24, 2006 | Mount Lemmon | Mount Lemmon Survey | · | 2.4 km | MPC · JPL |
| 231351 | 2006 FM_{37} | — | March 24, 2006 | Siding Spring | SSS | · | 2.3 km | MPC · JPL |
| 231352 | 2006 FP_{39} | — | March 24, 2006 | Mount Lemmon | Mount Lemmon Survey | AGN | 1.6 km | MPC · JPL |
| 231353 | 2006 GW_{11} | — | April 2, 2006 | Kitt Peak | Spacewatch | · | 3.2 km | MPC · JPL |
| 231354 | 2006 GY_{16} | — | April 2, 2006 | Kitt Peak | Spacewatch | · | 2.8 km | MPC · JPL |
| 231355 | 2006 GC_{17} | — | April 2, 2006 | Kitt Peak | Spacewatch | · | 3.5 km | MPC · JPL |
| 231356 | 2006 GE_{23} | — | April 2, 2006 | Kitt Peak | Spacewatch | · | 3.3 km | MPC · JPL |
| 231357 | 2006 GL_{28} | — | April 2, 2006 | Kitt Peak | Spacewatch | KOR | 1.7 km | MPC · JPL |
| 231358 | 2006 GO_{35} | — | April 7, 2006 | Catalina | CSS | · | 3.4 km | MPC · JPL |
| 231359 | 2006 GB_{37} | — | April 8, 2006 | Mount Lemmon | Mount Lemmon Survey | · | 2.2 km | MPC · JPL |
| 231360 | 2006 GV_{40} | — | April 7, 2006 | Catalina | CSS | · | 3.8 km | MPC · JPL |
| 231361 | 2006 GM_{42} | — | April 2, 2006 | Anderson Mesa | LONEOS | · | 3.1 km | MPC · JPL |
| 231362 | 2006 GO_{42} | — | April 6, 2006 | Catalina | CSS | · | 3.2 km | MPC · JPL |
| 231363 | 2006 GO_{49} | — | April 7, 2006 | Catalina | CSS | · | 2.9 km | MPC · JPL |
| 231364 | 2006 GA_{54} | — | April 8, 2006 | Kitt Peak | Spacewatch | · | 3.5 km | MPC · JPL |
| 231365 | 2006 HL_{2} | — | April 18, 2006 | Palomar | NEAT | · | 3.3 km | MPC · JPL |
| 231366 | 2006 HQ_{7} | — | April 19, 2006 | Palomar | NEAT | · | 3.9 km | MPC · JPL |
| 231367 | 2006 HM_{17} | — | April 18, 2006 | Catalina | CSS | EOS | 3.2 km | MPC · JPL |
| 231368 Hunfalvy | 2006 HF_{18} | Hunfalvy | April 22, 2006 | Piszkéstető | K. Sárneczky | AGN | 1.6 km | MPC · JPL |
| 231369 | 2006 HD_{22} | — | April 20, 2006 | Kitt Peak | Spacewatch | · | 3.1 km | MPC · JPL |
| 231370 | 2006 HK_{24} | — | April 20, 2006 | Kitt Peak | Spacewatch | · | 2.1 km | MPC · JPL |
| 231371 | 2006 HR_{27} | — | April 20, 2006 | Kitt Peak | Spacewatch | · | 3.4 km | MPC · JPL |
| 231372 | 2006 HA_{36} | — | April 20, 2006 | Kitt Peak | Spacewatch | · | 2.3 km | MPC · JPL |
| 231373 | 2006 HA_{40} | — | April 21, 2006 | Kitt Peak | Spacewatch | · | 6.3 km | MPC · JPL |
| 231374 | 2006 HY_{41} | — | April 21, 2006 | Kitt Peak | Spacewatch | EOS | 2.3 km | MPC · JPL |
| 231375 | 2006 HW_{49} | — | April 26, 2006 | Kitt Peak | Spacewatch | · | 1.7 km | MPC · JPL |
| 231376 | 2006 HY_{61} | — | April 24, 2006 | Kitt Peak | Spacewatch | · | 2.6 km | MPC · JPL |
| 231377 | 2006 HG_{95} | — | April 30, 2006 | Kitt Peak | Spacewatch | EOS | 3.1 km | MPC · JPL |
| 231378 | 2006 HD_{107} | — | April 30, 2006 | Kitt Peak | Spacewatch | EOS | 3.1 km | MPC · JPL |
| 231379 Jonhandiboe | 2006 HV_{133} | Jonhandiboe | April 26, 2006 | Cerro Tololo | M. W. Buie | · | 3.5 km | MPC · JPL |
| 231380 | 2006 JJ | — | May 1, 2006 | Reedy Creek | J. Broughton | · | 3.4 km | MPC · JPL |
| 231381 | 2006 JW_{12} | — | May 1, 2006 | Kitt Peak | Spacewatch | VER | 4.2 km | MPC · JPL |
| 231382 | 2006 JB_{36} | — | May 4, 2006 | Kitt Peak | Spacewatch | · | 3.8 km | MPC · JPL |
| 231383 | 2006 JN_{42} | — | May 2, 2006 | Kitt Peak | Spacewatch | KOR | 1.7 km | MPC · JPL |
| 231384 | 2006 JJ_{47} | — | May 1, 2006 | Kitt Peak | Spacewatch | URS | 7.2 km | MPC · JPL |
| 231385 | 2006 JN_{54} | — | May 8, 2006 | Mount Lemmon | Mount Lemmon Survey | · | 1.1 km | MPC · JPL |
| 231386 | 2006 JU_{54} | — | May 8, 2006 | Mount Lemmon | Mount Lemmon Survey | HYG | 3.8 km | MPC · JPL |
| 231387 | 2006 KW_{8} | — | May 19, 2006 | Mount Lemmon | Mount Lemmon Survey | · | 3.5 km | MPC · JPL |
| 231388 | 2006 KB_{17} | — | May 20, 2006 | Catalina | CSS | · | 6.2 km | MPC · JPL |
| 231389 | 2006 KO_{18} | — | May 21, 2006 | Kitt Peak | Spacewatch | EOS | 3.0 km | MPC · JPL |
| 231390 | 2006 KP_{33} | — | May 20, 2006 | Kitt Peak | Spacewatch | · | 3.4 km | MPC · JPL |
| 231391 | 2006 KA_{37} | — | May 21, 2006 | Mount Lemmon | Mount Lemmon Survey | THM | 2.8 km | MPC · JPL |
| 231392 | 2006 KP_{64} | — | May 23, 2006 | Mount Lemmon | Mount Lemmon Survey | EOS | 3.2 km | MPC · JPL |
| 231393 | 2006 KM_{65} | — | May 24, 2006 | Mount Lemmon | Mount Lemmon Survey | AGN | 1.7 km | MPC · JPL |
| 231394 | 2006 KO_{66} | — | May 24, 2006 | Kitt Peak | Spacewatch | THM | 3.0 km | MPC · JPL |
| 231395 | 2006 KM_{115} | — | May 29, 2006 | Kitt Peak | Spacewatch | · | 4.7 km | MPC · JPL |
| 231396 | 2006 KR_{116} | — | May 29, 2006 | Kitt Peak | Spacewatch | · | 4.6 km | MPC · JPL |
| 231397 | 2006 MB_{15} | — | June 24, 2006 | Anderson Mesa | LONEOS | H | 850 m | MPC · JPL |
| 231398 | 2006 PX_{9} | — | August 13, 2006 | Palomar | NEAT | 3:2 | 8.4 km | MPC · JPL |
| 231399 | 2006 QH_{84} | — | August 27, 2006 | Kitt Peak | Spacewatch | · | 3.1 km | MPC · JPL |
| 231400 | 2006 SE_{32} | — | September 17, 2006 | Kitt Peak | Spacewatch | 3:2 · SHU | 6.6 km | MPC · JPL |

== 231401–231500 ==
back to top

| Designation | | | Discovery | | | Properties | | Ref |
| Permanent | Provisional | Named after | Date | Site | Discoverer(s) | Category | Diam. | Ref |
|---|---|---|---|---|---|---|---|---|
| 231401 | 2006 SM_{273} | — | September 27, 2006 | Mount Lemmon | Mount Lemmon Survey | · | 1.6 km | MPC · JPL |
| 231402 | 2006 TP_{107} | — | October 4, 2006 | Mount Lemmon | Mount Lemmon Survey | H | 750 m | MPC · JPL |
| 231403 | 2006 WR_{4} | — | November 22, 2006 | Catalina | CSS | H | 790 m | MPC · JPL |
| 231404 | 2006 WA_{151} | — | November 20, 2006 | Siding Spring | SSS | H | 910 m | MPC · JPL |
| 231405 | 2006 WZ_{201} | — | November 27, 2006 | Mount Lemmon | Mount Lemmon Survey | · | 760 m | MPC · JPL |
| 231406 | 2006 YH_{9} | — | December 20, 2006 | Mount Lemmon | Mount Lemmon Survey | · | 680 m | MPC · JPL |
| 231407 | 2006 YU_{10} | — | December 21, 2006 | Mount Lemmon | Mount Lemmon Survey | · | 1.3 km | MPC · JPL |
| 231408 | 2007 AO_{30} | — | January 9, 2007 | Catalina | CSS | · | 2.2 km | MPC · JPL |
| 231409 | 2007 BH_{9} | — | January 17, 2007 | Catalina | CSS | NAE | 5.8 km | MPC · JPL |
| 231410 | 2007 BC_{76} | — | January 28, 2007 | Mount Lemmon | Mount Lemmon Survey | · | 1.0 km | MPC · JPL |
| 231411 | 2007 CB_{26} | — | February 9, 2007 | Catalina | CSS | · | 2.9 km | MPC · JPL |
| 231412 | 2007 CL_{41} | — | February 7, 2007 | Kitt Peak | Spacewatch | · | 1.6 km | MPC · JPL |
| 231413 | 2007 CT_{41} | — | February 7, 2007 | Kitt Peak | Spacewatch | · | 910 m | MPC · JPL |
| 231414 | 2007 DH_{40} | — | February 19, 2007 | Catalina | CSS | PHO | 3.1 km | MPC · JPL |
| 231415 | 2007 DE_{42} | — | February 16, 2007 | Palomar | NEAT | · | 880 m | MPC · JPL |
| 231416 | 2007 DB_{49} | — | February 21, 2007 | Mount Lemmon | Mount Lemmon Survey | MAS | 810 m | MPC · JPL |
| 231417 | 2007 DH_{63} | — | February 21, 2007 | Kitt Peak | Spacewatch | · | 980 m | MPC · JPL |
| 231418 | 2007 EE_{12} | — | March 9, 2007 | Catalina | CSS | · | 1.5 km | MPC · JPL |
| 231419 | 2007 EO_{38} | — | March 11, 2007 | Kitt Peak | Spacewatch | · | 1.9 km | MPC · JPL |
| 231420 | 2007 EO_{50} | — | March 10, 2007 | Mount Lemmon | Mount Lemmon Survey | · | 780 m | MPC · JPL |
| 231421 | 2007 EU_{55} | — | March 12, 2007 | Mount Lemmon | Mount Lemmon Survey | · | 2.8 km | MPC · JPL |
| 231422 | 2007 EG_{65} | — | March 10, 2007 | Kitt Peak | Spacewatch | · | 1.0 km | MPC · JPL |
| 231423 | 2007 EH_{76} | — | March 10, 2007 | Kitt Peak | Spacewatch | · | 1.0 km | MPC · JPL |
| 231424 | 2007 EG_{79} | — | March 10, 2007 | Kitt Peak | Spacewatch | · | 2.2 km | MPC · JPL |
| 231425 | 2007 EF_{105} | — | March 11, 2007 | Mount Lemmon | Mount Lemmon Survey | · | 950 m | MPC · JPL |
| 231426 | 2007 EU_{109} | — | March 11, 2007 | Kitt Peak | Spacewatch | · | 1.1 km | MPC · JPL |
| 231427 | 2007 EM_{112} | — | March 11, 2007 | Mount Lemmon | Mount Lemmon Survey | · | 1.1 km | MPC · JPL |
| 231428 | 2007 ET_{112} | — | March 11, 2007 | Kitt Peak | Spacewatch | · | 2.3 km | MPC · JPL |
| 231429 | 2007 ER_{122} | — | March 14, 2007 | Anderson Mesa | LONEOS | · | 860 m | MPC · JPL |
| 231430 | 2007 EC_{127} | — | March 9, 2007 | Palomar | NEAT | · | 1.3 km | MPC · JPL |
| 231431 | 2007 ES_{130} | — | March 9, 2007 | Mount Lemmon | Mount Lemmon Survey | NYS | 1.2 km | MPC · JPL |
| 231432 | 2007 EJ_{142} | — | March 12, 2007 | Kitt Peak | Spacewatch | · | 1.9 km | MPC · JPL |
| 231433 | 2007 EV_{159} | — | March 14, 2007 | Mount Lemmon | Mount Lemmon Survey | (2076) | 1.3 km | MPC · JPL |
| 231434 | 2007 EF_{180} | — | March 14, 2007 | Kitt Peak | Spacewatch | · | 880 m | MPC · JPL |
| 231435 | 2007 EW_{196} | — | March 15, 2007 | Kitt Peak | Spacewatch | · | 1.4 km | MPC · JPL |
| 231436 | 2007 FH_{2} | — | March 16, 2007 | Catalina | CSS | · | 1.3 km | MPC · JPL |
| 231437 | 2007 FG_{15} | — | March 16, 2007 | Kitt Peak | Spacewatch | · | 2.3 km | MPC · JPL |
| 231438 | 2007 FT_{15} | — | March 19, 2007 | Catalina | CSS | · | 2.1 km | MPC · JPL |
| 231439 | 2007 FU_{23} | — | March 20, 2007 | Kitt Peak | Spacewatch | · | 2.0 km | MPC · JPL |
| 231440 | 2007 GB_{19} | — | April 11, 2007 | Kitt Peak | Spacewatch | · | 1.7 km | MPC · JPL |
| 231441 | 2007 GM_{29} | — | April 11, 2007 | Catalina | CSS | · | 1.3 km | MPC · JPL |
| 231442 | 2007 GS_{32} | — | April 15, 2007 | Catalina | CSS | · | 1.5 km | MPC · JPL |
| 231443 | 2007 GH_{40} | — | April 14, 2007 | Kitt Peak | Spacewatch | · | 1.5 km | MPC · JPL |
| 231444 | 2007 GR_{43} | — | April 14, 2007 | Mount Lemmon | Mount Lemmon Survey | NYS | 1.3 km | MPC · JPL |
| 231445 | 2007 GF_{60} | — | April 15, 2007 | Kitt Peak | Spacewatch | · | 1.2 km | MPC · JPL |
| 231446 Dayao | 2007 GE_{75} | Dayao | April 10, 2007 | XuYi | PMO NEO Survey Program | · | 2.4 km | MPC · JPL |
| 231447 | 2007 HE_{1} | — | April 16, 2007 | Catalina | CSS | · | 3.1 km | MPC · JPL |
| 231448 | 2007 HL_{46} | — | April 20, 2007 | Anderson Mesa | LONEOS | · | 930 m | MPC · JPL |
| 231449 | 2007 HH_{51} | — | April 20, 2007 | Kitt Peak | Spacewatch | · | 1.3 km | MPC · JPL |
| 231450 | 2007 HK_{58} | — | April 23, 2007 | Catalina | CSS | · | 7.1 km | MPC · JPL |
| 231451 | 2007 HL_{72} | — | April 22, 2007 | Kitt Peak | Spacewatch | · | 1.6 km | MPC · JPL |
| 231452 | 2007 HC_{74} | — | April 22, 2007 | Catalina | CSS | · | 1.6 km | MPC · JPL |
| 231453 | 2007 HS_{82} | — | April 16, 2007 | Catalina | CSS | V | 930 m | MPC · JPL |
| 231454 | 2007 HK_{95} | — | April 28, 2007 | Kitt Peak | Spacewatch | · | 1.4 km | MPC · JPL |
| 231455 | 2007 JY_{8} | — | May 9, 2007 | Mount Lemmon | Mount Lemmon Survey | PAD | 3.5 km | MPC · JPL |
| 231456 | 2007 JC_{15} | — | May 10, 2007 | Mount Lemmon | Mount Lemmon Survey | · | 1.1 km | MPC · JPL |
| 231457 | 2007 JN_{31} | — | May 12, 2007 | Mount Lemmon | Mount Lemmon Survey | · | 1.7 km | MPC · JPL |
| 231458 | 2007 LN_{19} | — | June 14, 2007 | Socorro | LINEAR | ADE | 4.9 km | MPC · JPL |
| 231459 | 2007 LV_{24} | — | June 14, 2007 | Kitt Peak | Spacewatch | · | 1.7 km | MPC · JPL |
| 231460 | 2007 MG_{7} | — | June 18, 2007 | Kitt Peak | Spacewatch | · | 1.9 km | MPC · JPL |
| 231461 | 2007 MC_{26} | — | June 22, 2007 | Anderson Mesa | LONEOS | · | 1.3 km | MPC · JPL |
| 231462 | 2007 OL_{7} | — | July 24, 2007 | Tiki | Teamo, N. | EOS | 2.8 km | MPC · JPL |
| 231463 | 2007 PO | — | August 5, 2007 | Wrightwood | J. W. Young | · | 6.3 km | MPC · JPL |
| 231464 | 2007 PR_{4} | — | August 7, 2007 | Charleston | Astronomical Research Observatory | L4 | 10 km | MPC · JPL |
| 231465 | 2007 PS_{4} | — | August 7, 2007 | Charleston | Astronomical Research Observatory | · | 2.4 km | MPC · JPL |
| 231466 | 2007 PJ_{13} | — | August 8, 2007 | Socorro | LINEAR | · | 2.5 km | MPC · JPL |
| 231467 | 2007 PZ_{19} | — | August 9, 2007 | Socorro | LINEAR | · | 6.8 km | MPC · JPL |
| 231468 | 2007 PT_{26} | — | August 11, 2007 | Bergisch Gladbach | W. Bickel | EUP | 6.6 km | MPC · JPL |
| 231469 | 2007 PR_{34} | — | August 9, 2007 | Socorro | LINEAR | · | 3.7 km | MPC · JPL |
| 231470 Bedding | 2007 RH_{5} | Bedding | September 2, 2007 | Siding Spring | K. Sárneczky, L. Kiss | KOR | 1.8 km | MPC · JPL |
| 231471 | 2007 TP_{185} | — | October 13, 2007 | Socorro | LINEAR | CYB | 5.1 km | MPC · JPL |
| 231472 | 2007 TX_{241} | — | October 8, 2007 | Kitt Peak | Spacewatch | HYG | 5.1 km | MPC · JPL |
| 231473 | 2007 TL_{408} | — | October 15, 2007 | Lulin | LUSS | · | 3.8 km | MPC · JPL |
| 231474 | 2007 UX_{82} | — | October 30, 2007 | Kitt Peak | Spacewatch | NYS | 1.2 km | MPC · JPL |
| 231475 | 2007 VO_{3} | — | November 1, 2007 | Skylive | Tozzi, F. | · | 3.7 km | MPC · JPL |
| 231476 | 2007 VC_{261} | — | November 13, 2007 | Kitt Peak | Spacewatch | · | 2.1 km | MPC · JPL |
| 231477 | 2008 EH_{149} | — | March 4, 2008 | Kitt Peak | Spacewatch | · | 1 km | MPC · JPL |
| 231478 | 2008 GB_{63} | — | April 5, 2008 | Catalina | CSS | · | 2.2 km | MPC · JPL |
| 231479 | 2008 HQ_{45} | — | April 28, 2008 | Mount Lemmon | Mount Lemmon Survey | · | 2.1 km | MPC · JPL |
| 231480 | 2008 HO_{61} | — | April 30, 2008 | Mount Lemmon | Mount Lemmon Survey | MIS | 3.5 km | MPC · JPL |
| 231481 | 2008 JZ_{25} | — | May 8, 2008 | Mount Lemmon | Mount Lemmon Survey | · | 980 m | MPC · JPL |
| 231482 | 2008 KL | — | May 26, 2008 | Grove Creek | Tozzi, F. | · | 930 m | MPC · JPL |
| 231483 | 2008 OD_{18} | — | July 30, 2008 | Mount Lemmon | Mount Lemmon Survey | · | 6.2 km | MPC · JPL |
| 231484 | 2008 OZ_{18} | — | July 25, 2008 | Siding Spring | SSS | · | 5.9 km | MPC · JPL |
| 231485 | 2008 OA_{22} | — | July 29, 2008 | Kitt Peak | Spacewatch | · | 890 m | MPC · JPL |
| 231486 Capefearrock | 2008 PQ_{2} | Capefearrock | August 3, 2008 | Charleston | R. Holmes, Devore, H. | · | 900 m | MPC · JPL |
| 231487 | 2008 PQ_{3} | — | August 3, 2008 | Vicques | M. Ory | · | 1.9 km | MPC · JPL |
| 231488 | 2008 PO_{6} | — | August 5, 2008 | La Sagra | OAM | · | 2.4 km | MPC · JPL |
| 231489 | 2008 PG_{15} | — | August 10, 2008 | La Sagra | OAM | · | 1.1 km | MPC · JPL |
| 231490 | 2008 QO_{7} | — | August 25, 2008 | Hibiscus | S. F. Hönig, Teamo, N. | · | 3.3 km | MPC · JPL |
| 231491 | 2008 QL_{17} | — | August 27, 2008 | La Sagra | OAM | AGN | 1.3 km | MPC · JPL |
| 231492 | 2008 QD_{18} | — | August 28, 2008 | La Sagra | OAM | · | 3.7 km | MPC · JPL |
| 231493 | 2008 QT_{19} | — | August 29, 2008 | Dauban | Kugel, F. | L4 | 10 km | MPC · JPL |
| 231494 | 2008 QL_{24} | — | August 26, 2008 | La Sagra | OAM | · | 4.5 km | MPC · JPL |
| 231495 | 2008 QJ_{27} | — | August 30, 2008 | La Sagra | OAM | MRX | 1.5 km | MPC · JPL |
| 231496 | 2008 QU_{29} | — | August 25, 2008 | La Sagra | OAM | · | 2.6 km | MPC · JPL |
| 231497 | 2008 QU_{33} | — | August 27, 2008 | La Sagra | OAM | · | 2.1 km | MPC · JPL |
| 231498 | 2008 QK_{38} | — | August 23, 2008 | Siding Spring | SSS | ADE | 2.5 km | MPC · JPL |
| 231499 | 2008 QQ_{40} | — | August 24, 2008 | Kitt Peak | Spacewatch | · | 1.5 km | MPC · JPL |
| 231500 | 2008 QY_{42} | — | August 30, 2008 | Socorro | LINEAR | · | 4.9 km | MPC · JPL |

== 231501–231600 ==
back to top

| Designation | | | Discovery | | | Properties | | Ref |
| Permanent | Provisional | Named after | Date | Site | Discoverer(s) | Category | Diam. | Ref |
|---|---|---|---|---|---|---|---|---|
| 231501 | 2008 QV_{43} | — | August 23, 2008 | Siding Spring | SSS | · | 3.3 km | MPC · JPL |
| 231502 | 2008 RD_{2} | — | September 2, 2008 | Kitt Peak | Spacewatch | (12739) | 2.6 km | MPC · JPL |
| 231503 | 2008 RN_{12} | — | September 3, 2008 | Kitt Peak | Spacewatch | · | 2.9 km | MPC · JPL |
| 231504 | 2008 RZ_{14} | — | September 4, 2008 | Kitt Peak | Spacewatch | · | 3.7 km | MPC · JPL |
| 231505 | 2008 RV_{33} | — | September 2, 2008 | Kitt Peak | Spacewatch | AGN | 1.6 km | MPC · JPL |
| 231506 | 2008 RB_{43} | — | September 2, 2008 | Kitt Peak | Spacewatch | · | 1.4 km | MPC · JPL |
| 231507 | 2008 RN_{44} | — | September 2, 2008 | Kitt Peak | Spacewatch | KOR | 1.9 km | MPC · JPL |
| 231508 | 2008 RD_{51} | — | September 3, 2008 | Kitt Peak | Spacewatch | · | 1.3 km | MPC · JPL |
| 231509 | 2008 RT_{69} | — | September 5, 2008 | Kitt Peak | Spacewatch | L4 | 10 km | MPC · JPL |
| 231510 | 2008 RC_{84} | — | September 4, 2008 | Kitt Peak | Spacewatch | · | 2.0 km | MPC · JPL |
| 231511 | 2008 RK_{102} | — | September 3, 2008 | Kitt Peak | Spacewatch | · | 2.4 km | MPC · JPL |
| 231512 | 2008 RD_{109} | — | September 1, 2008 | Siding Spring | SSS | · | 4.8 km | MPC · JPL |
| 231513 | 2008 RA_{113} | — | September 5, 2008 | Kitt Peak | Spacewatch | · | 2.6 km | MPC · JPL |
| 231514 | 2008 RW_{113} | — | September 6, 2008 | Mount Lemmon | Mount Lemmon Survey | THM | 3.3 km | MPC · JPL |
| 231515 | 2008 RD_{117} | — | September 8, 2008 | Catalina | CSS | · | 2.7 km | MPC · JPL |
| 231516 | 2008 RK_{124} | — | September 6, 2008 | Mount Lemmon | Mount Lemmon Survey | L4 | 10 km | MPC · JPL |
| 231517 | 2008 SH_{29} | — | September 19, 2008 | Kitt Peak | Spacewatch | · | 4.2 km | MPC · JPL |
| 231518 | 2008 SJ_{33} | — | September 20, 2008 | Mount Lemmon | Mount Lemmon Survey | · | 1.6 km | MPC · JPL |
| 231519 | 2008 SO_{35} | — | September 20, 2008 | Kitt Peak | Spacewatch | THM | 3.0 km | MPC · JPL |
| 231520 | 2008 SK_{38} | — | September 20, 2008 | Kitt Peak | Spacewatch | HOF | 3.4 km | MPC · JPL |
| 231521 | 2008 SF_{43} | — | September 20, 2008 | Mount Lemmon | Mount Lemmon Survey | · | 2.9 km | MPC · JPL |
| 231522 | 2008 SD_{44} | — | September 20, 2008 | Kitt Peak | Spacewatch | · | 2.0 km | MPC · JPL |
| 231523 | 2008 SX_{45} | — | September 20, 2008 | Kitt Peak | Spacewatch | (5) | 1.7 km | MPC · JPL |
| 231524 | 2008 SA_{56} | — | September 20, 2008 | Kitt Peak | Spacewatch | · | 2.1 km | MPC · JPL |
| 231525 | 2008 SX_{81} | — | September 25, 2008 | Kachina | Hobart, J. | · | 2.9 km | MPC · JPL |
| 231526 | 2008 SV_{82} | — | September 26, 2008 | Sierra Stars | Tozzi, F. | EUN | 1.9 km | MPC · JPL |
| 231527 | 2008 SU_{84} | — | September 28, 2008 | Prairie Grass | Mahony, J. | · | 5.1 km | MPC · JPL |
| 231528 | 2008 SV_{103} | — | September 21, 2008 | Kitt Peak | Spacewatch | KOR | 1.6 km | MPC · JPL |
| 231529 | 2008 SG_{105} | — | September 21, 2008 | Kitt Peak | Spacewatch | KOR | 1.8 km | MPC · JPL |
| 231530 | 2008 SR_{105} | — | September 21, 2008 | Kitt Peak | Spacewatch | KOR | 1.8 km | MPC · JPL |
| 231531 | 2008 SL_{106} | — | September 21, 2008 | Kitt Peak | Spacewatch | · | 2.4 km | MPC · JPL |
| 231532 | 2008 SK_{126} | — | September 22, 2008 | Kitt Peak | Spacewatch | · | 2.0 km | MPC · JPL |
| 231533 | 2008 SR_{128} | — | September 22, 2008 | Kitt Peak | Spacewatch | PAD | 2.6 km | MPC · JPL |
| 231534 | 2008 SS_{134} | — | September 23, 2008 | Kitt Peak | Spacewatch | · | 2.0 km | MPC · JPL |
| 231535 | 2008 ST_{147} | — | September 25, 2008 | Junk Bond | D. Healy | · | 2.0 km | MPC · JPL |
| 231536 | 2008 SV_{156} | — | September 24, 2008 | Socorro | LINEAR | · | 2.2 km | MPC · JPL |
| 231537 | 2008 SB_{163} | — | September 28, 2008 | Socorro | LINEAR | THM | 3.4 km | MPC · JPL |
| 231538 | 2008 SO_{164} | — | September 28, 2008 | Socorro | LINEAR | KOR | 2.5 km | MPC · JPL |
| 231539 | 2008 SG_{165} | — | September 28, 2008 | Socorro | LINEAR | · | 5.3 km | MPC · JPL |
| 231540 | 2008 SU_{173} | — | September 22, 2008 | Catalina | CSS | · | 4.7 km | MPC · JPL |
| 231541 | 2008 SF_{174} | — | September 22, 2008 | Kitt Peak | Spacewatch | KOR | 1.5 km | MPC · JPL |
| 231542 | 2008 SV_{179} | — | September 24, 2008 | Kitt Peak | Spacewatch | · | 3.3 km | MPC · JPL |
| 231543 | 2008 SR_{218} | — | September 30, 2008 | La Sagra | OAM | AGN | 1.7 km | MPC · JPL |
| 231544 | 2008 SO_{219} | — | September 30, 2008 | La Sagra | OAM | HYG | 3.2 km | MPC · JPL |
| 231545 | 2008 SR_{244} | — | September 29, 2008 | Catalina | CSS | WIT | 1.3 km | MPC · JPL |
| 231546 | 2008 SU_{244} | — | September 29, 2008 | Catalina | CSS | WIT | 1.5 km | MPC · JPL |
| 231547 | 2008 SU_{245} | — | September 29, 2008 | Catalina | CSS | HOF | 4.1 km | MPC · JPL |
| 231548 | 2008 SO_{248} | — | September 20, 2008 | Kitt Peak | Spacewatch | · | 2.7 km | MPC · JPL |
| 231549 | 2008 SS_{254} | — | September 22, 2008 | Catalina | CSS | · | 4.0 km | MPC · JPL |
| 231550 | 2008 SV_{258} | — | September 23, 2008 | Kitt Peak | Spacewatch | DOR | 3.9 km | MPC · JPL |
| 231551 | 2008 SJ_{266} | — | September 23, 2008 | Kitt Peak | Spacewatch | · | 5.4 km | MPC · JPL |
| 231552 | 2008 SB_{269} | — | September 30, 2008 | Catalina | CSS | · | 3.8 km | MPC · JPL |
| 231553 | 2008 SS_{274} | — | September 21, 2008 | Kitt Peak | Spacewatch | · | 2.3 km | MPC · JPL |
| 231554 | 2008 SP_{296} | — | September 29, 2008 | Catalina | CSS | · | 1.3 km | MPC · JPL |
| 231555 Christianeurda | 2008 TT_{2} | Christianeurda | October 1, 2008 | Bergen-Enkheim | Suessenberger, U. | · | 4.6 km | MPC · JPL |
| 231556 | 2008 TT_{4} | — | October 1, 2008 | La Sagra | OAM | HOF | 3.5 km | MPC · JPL |
| 231557 | 2008 TQ_{27} | — | October 1, 2008 | La Sagra | OAM | · | 4.6 km | MPC · JPL |
| 231558 | 2008 TQ_{41} | — | October 1, 2008 | Mount Lemmon | Mount Lemmon Survey | EOS | 2.1 km | MPC · JPL |
| 231559 | 2008 TC_{46} | — | October 1, 2008 | Kitt Peak | Spacewatch | · | 3.9 km | MPC · JPL |
| 231560 | 2008 TV_{50} | — | October 2, 2008 | Kitt Peak | Spacewatch | KOR | 1.6 km | MPC · JPL |
| 231561 | 2008 TH_{59} | — | October 2, 2008 | Kitt Peak | Spacewatch | · | 3.9 km | MPC · JPL |
| 231562 | 2008 TE_{63} | — | October 2, 2008 | Kitt Peak | Spacewatch | · | 2.4 km | MPC · JPL |
| 231563 | 2008 TR_{71} | — | October 2, 2008 | Kitt Peak | Spacewatch | · | 2.5 km | MPC · JPL |
| 231564 | 2008 TA_{74} | — | October 2, 2008 | Kitt Peak | Spacewatch | · | 2.6 km | MPC · JPL |
| 231565 | 2008 TP_{129} | — | October 8, 2008 | Mount Lemmon | Mount Lemmon Survey | · | 3.3 km | MPC · JPL |
| 231566 | 2008 TQ_{146} | — | October 9, 2008 | Mount Lemmon | Mount Lemmon Survey | · | 3.6 km | MPC · JPL |
| 231567 | 2008 TT_{163} | — | October 1, 2008 | Kitt Peak | Spacewatch | KOR | 1.7 km | MPC · JPL |
| 231568 | 2008 TJ_{164} | — | October 1, 2008 | Catalina | CSS | MAR | 2.1 km | MPC · JPL |
| 231569 | 2008 TU_{165} | — | October 6, 2008 | La Sagra | OAM | · | 2.6 km | MPC · JPL |
| 231570 | 2008 TF_{180} | — | October 2, 2008 | Catalina | CSS | EOS | 3.5 km | MPC · JPL |
| 231571 Tubolyvince | 2008 UP_{3} | Tubolyvince | October 22, 2008 | Piszkéstető | K. Sárneczky, Karpati, A. | KOR | 1.6 km | MPC · JPL |
| 231572 | 2008 UN_{9} | — | October 17, 2008 | Kitt Peak | Spacewatch | L4 | 10 km | MPC · JPL |
| 231573 | 2008 UK_{28} | — | October 20, 2008 | Kitt Peak | Spacewatch | · | 2.5 km | MPC · JPL |
| 231574 | 2008 UF_{57} | — | October 21, 2008 | Kitt Peak | Spacewatch | · | 3.4 km | MPC · JPL |
| 231575 | 2008 UO_{57} | — | October 21, 2008 | Kitt Peak | Spacewatch | MAS | 1.3 km | MPC · JPL |
| 231576 | 2008 UX_{68} | — | October 21, 2008 | Mount Lemmon | Mount Lemmon Survey | · | 3.4 km | MPC · JPL |
| 231577 | 2008 UQ_{94} | — | October 28, 2008 | Socorro | LINEAR | · | 2.6 km | MPC · JPL |
| 231578 | 2008 UC_{155} | — | October 23, 2008 | Mount Lemmon | Mount Lemmon Survey | · | 2.3 km | MPC · JPL |
| 231579 | 2008 UG_{170} | — | October 24, 2008 | Catalina | CSS | · | 4.8 km | MPC · JPL |
| 231580 | 2008 UV_{181} | — | October 24, 2008 | Mount Lemmon | Mount Lemmon Survey | · | 3.0 km | MPC · JPL |
| 231581 | 2008 UR_{196} | — | October 27, 2008 | Kitt Peak | Spacewatch | · | 3.7 km | MPC · JPL |
| 231582 | 2008 US_{216} | — | October 25, 2008 | Kitt Peak | Spacewatch | KOR | 1.8 km | MPC · JPL |
| 231583 | 2008 UY_{219} | — | October 25, 2008 | Kitt Peak | Spacewatch | · | 3.1 km | MPC · JPL |
| 231584 | 2008 UG_{255} | — | October 27, 2008 | Kitt Peak | Spacewatch | · | 3.1 km | MPC · JPL |
| 231585 | 2008 UH_{256} | — | October 27, 2008 | Kitt Peak | Spacewatch | KOR | 1.7 km | MPC · JPL |
| 231586 | 2008 UP_{266} | — | October 28, 2008 | Kitt Peak | Spacewatch | HYG | 3.4 km | MPC · JPL |
| 231587 | 2008 UL_{274} | — | October 28, 2008 | Kitt Peak | Spacewatch | · | 3.6 km | MPC · JPL |
| 231588 | 2008 UH_{277} | — | October 28, 2008 | Mount Lemmon | Mount Lemmon Survey | · | 1.4 km | MPC · JPL |
| 231589 | 2008 UZ_{311} | — | October 30, 2008 | Kitt Peak | Spacewatch | · | 7.3 km | MPC · JPL |
| 231590 | 2008 UZ_{315} | — | October 30, 2008 | Mount Lemmon | Mount Lemmon Survey | · | 2.9 km | MPC · JPL |
| 231591 | 2008 UP_{336} | — | October 23, 2008 | Kitt Peak | Spacewatch | · | 2.8 km | MPC · JPL |
| 231592 | 2008 UG_{346} | — | October 24, 2008 | Mount Lemmon | Mount Lemmon Survey | NYS | 1.6 km | MPC · JPL |
| 231593 | 2008 UW_{353} | — | October 20, 2008 | Mount Lemmon | Mount Lemmon Survey | THM | 3.2 km | MPC · JPL |
| 231594 | 2008 US_{358} | — | October 26, 2008 | Catalina | CSS | · | 5.5 km | MPC · JPL |
| 231595 | 2008 VF_{70} | — | November 6, 2008 | Kitt Peak | Spacewatch | MRX | 1.5 km | MPC · JPL |
| 231596 | 2008 WQ | — | November 17, 2008 | Kitt Peak | Spacewatch | · | 2.4 km | MPC · JPL |
| 231597 | 2008 WV_{35} | — | November 17, 2008 | Kitt Peak | Spacewatch | THM | 3.1 km | MPC · JPL |
| 231598 | 2008 YE_{135} | — | December 30, 2008 | Kitt Peak | Spacewatch | · | 2.3 km | MPC · JPL |
| 231599 | 2008 YJ_{149} | — | December 21, 2008 | Kitt Peak | Spacewatch | · | 2.9 km | MPC · JPL |
| 231600 | 2009 AA_{19} | — | January 2, 2009 | Kitt Peak | Spacewatch | V | 970 m | MPC · JPL |

== 231601–231700 ==
back to top

| Designation | | | Discovery | | | Properties | | Ref |
| Permanent | Provisional | Named after | Date | Site | Discoverer(s) | Category | Diam. | Ref |
|---|---|---|---|---|---|---|---|---|
| 231601 | 2009 BW_{68} | — | January 25, 2009 | Kitt Peak | Spacewatch | MAS | 960 m | MPC · JPL |
| 231602 | 2009 BD_{131} | — | January 31, 2009 | Mount Lemmon | Mount Lemmon Survey | · | 1.1 km | MPC · JPL |
| 231603 | 2009 CD_{16} | — | February 1, 2009 | Kitt Peak | Spacewatch | NYS | 1.5 km | MPC · JPL |
| 231604 | 2009 FG_{74} | — | March 31, 2009 | Kitt Peak | Spacewatch | · | 1.4 km | MPC · JPL |
| 231605 | 2009 HN_{60} | — | April 21, 2009 | Socorro | LINEAR | · | 2.0 km | MPC · JPL |
| 231606 | 2009 HN_{102} | — | April 22, 2009 | Mount Lemmon | Mount Lemmon Survey | EMA | 5.1 km | MPC · JPL |
| 231607 | 2009 JQ_{12} | — | May 15, 2009 | La Sagra | OAM | · | 1.4 km | MPC · JPL |
| 231608 | 2009 QK_{4} | — | August 17, 2009 | Catalina | CSS | · | 1.4 km | MPC · JPL |
| 231609 Sarcander | 2009 RV | Sarcander | September 10, 2009 | ESA OGS | ESA OGS | EOS | 2.2 km | MPC · JPL |
| 231610 | 2009 RK_{12} | — | September 12, 2009 | Kitt Peak | Spacewatch | L4 | 8.3 km | MPC · JPL |
| 231611 | 2009 RC_{62} | — | September 14, 2009 | Kitt Peak | Spacewatch | · | 2.9 km | MPC · JPL |
| 231612 | 2009 RO_{64} | — | September 15, 2009 | Kitt Peak | Spacewatch | L4 | 10 km | MPC · JPL |
| 231613 | 2009 SQ_{25} | — | September 16, 2009 | Kitt Peak | Spacewatch | L4 | 10 km | MPC · JPL |
| 231614 | 2009 SQ_{38} | — | September 16, 2009 | Kitt Peak | Spacewatch | · | 1.5 km | MPC · JPL |
| 231615 | 2009 SK_{78} | — | September 18, 2009 | Kitt Peak | Spacewatch | L4 | 10 km | MPC · JPL |
| 231616 | 2009 SR_{96} | — | September 19, 2009 | Mount Lemmon | Mount Lemmon Survey | · | 780 m | MPC · JPL |
| 231617 | 2009 SW_{102} | — | September 24, 2009 | La Sagra | OAM | H | 610 m | MPC · JPL |
| 231618 | 2009 SF_{104} | — | September 25, 2009 | Taunus | Karge, S., R. Kling | · | 1.3 km | MPC · JPL |
| 231619 | 2009 SJ_{108} | — | September 16, 2009 | Mount Lemmon | Mount Lemmon Survey | · | 790 m | MPC · JPL |
| 231620 | 2009 SY_{128} | — | September 18, 2009 | Kitt Peak | Spacewatch | L4 | 10 km | MPC · JPL |
| 231621 | 2009 SB_{132} | — | September 18, 2009 | Kitt Peak | Spacewatch | L4 | 10 km | MPC · JPL |
| 231622 | 2009 SX_{159} | — | September 20, 2009 | Kitt Peak | Spacewatch | · | 2.6 km | MPC · JPL |
| 231623 | 2009 SR_{207} | — | September 23, 2009 | Kitt Peak | Spacewatch | L4 · HEK | 10 km | MPC · JPL |
| 231624 | 2009 SN_{232} | — | September 19, 2009 | Catalina | CSS | · | 1.7 km | MPC · JPL |
| 231625 | 2009 SO_{255} | — | September 20, 2009 | Catalina | CSS | · | 6.7 km | MPC · JPL |
| 231626 | 2009 SU_{258} | — | September 21, 2009 | Kitt Peak | Spacewatch | · | 3.7 km | MPC · JPL |
| 231627 | 2009 SU_{345} | — | September 19, 2009 | Mount Lemmon | Mount Lemmon Survey | · | 1.6 km | MPC · JPL |
| 231628 | 2009 SY_{351} | — | September 17, 2009 | Kitt Peak | Spacewatch | · | 2.7 km | MPC · JPL |
| 231629 | 2009 TH_{13} | — | October 14, 2009 | Bisei SG Center | BATTeRS | · | 2.5 km | MPC · JPL |
| 231630 | 2009 TW_{24} | — | October 14, 2009 | Catalina | CSS | · | 4.3 km | MPC · JPL |
| 231631 | 2009 TV_{41} | — | October 12, 2009 | La Sagra | OAM | L4 | 14 km | MPC · JPL |
| 231632 | 2009 UZ_{12} | — | October 17, 2009 | Mount Lemmon | Mount Lemmon Survey | · | 3.0 km | MPC · JPL |
| 231633 | 2009 UV_{26} | — | October 21, 2009 | Catalina | CSS | EOS | 2.8 km | MPC · JPL |
| 231634 | 2009 UD_{36} | — | October 22, 2009 | Mount Lemmon | Mount Lemmon Survey | EOS | 3.2 km | MPC · JPL |
| 231635 | 2009 UV_{71} | — | October 23, 2009 | Kitt Peak | Spacewatch | · | 2.6 km | MPC · JPL |
| 231636 | 2009 UP_{84} | — | October 23, 2009 | Mount Lemmon | Mount Lemmon Survey | L4 | 10 km | MPC · JPL |
| 231637 | 2009 UK_{88} | — | October 21, 2009 | Catalina | CSS | · | 3.0 km | MPC · JPL |
| 231638 | 2009 UY_{88} | — | October 24, 2009 | Catalina | CSS | · | 4.4 km | MPC · JPL |
| 231639 | 2009 UC_{127} | — | October 22, 2009 | Catalina | CSS | · | 4.8 km | MPC · JPL |
| 231640 | 2009 UJ_{129} | — | October 24, 2009 | Catalina | CSS | · | 1.0 km | MPC · JPL |
| 231641 | 2009 UO_{138} | — | October 18, 2009 | Siding Spring | SSS | · | 1.6 km | MPC · JPL |
| 231642 | 2009 UY_{140} | — | October 30, 2009 | Mount Lemmon | Mount Lemmon Survey | · | 3.1 km | MPC · JPL |
| 231643 | 2009 VJ_{2} | — | November 9, 2009 | Socorro | LINEAR | · | 1.5 km | MPC · JPL |
| 231644 | 2009 VV_{61} | — | November 8, 2009 | Kitt Peak | Spacewatch | · | 1.6 km | MPC · JPL |
| 231645 | 2009 VQ_{88} | — | November 10, 2009 | Kitt Peak | Spacewatch | · | 2.3 km | MPC · JPL |
| 231646 | 2009 VX_{103} | — | November 10, 2009 | Kitt Peak | Spacewatch | EOS | 2.6 km | MPC · JPL |
| 231647 | 2009 VD_{110} | — | November 9, 2009 | Kitt Peak | Spacewatch | · | 4.1 km | MPC · JPL |
| 231648 | 2009 VV_{112} | — | November 8, 2009 | Kitt Peak | Spacewatch | · | 3.2 km | MPC · JPL |
| 231649 Korotkiy | 2009 WW | Korotkiy | November 17, 2009 | Tzec Maun | A. Novichonok, D. Chestnov | · | 2.4 km | MPC · JPL |
| 231650 | 2009 WZ_{8} | — | November 18, 2009 | Socorro | LINEAR | · | 2.4 km | MPC · JPL |
| 231651 | 2009 WE_{9} | — | November 18, 2009 | Socorro | LINEAR | · | 1.5 km | MPC · JPL |
| 231652 | 2009 WE_{24} | — | November 18, 2009 | Socorro | LINEAR | · | 1.1 km | MPC · JPL |
| 231653 | 2009 WH_{24} | — | November 18, 2009 | Socorro | LINEAR | · | 1.5 km | MPC · JPL |
| 231654 | 2009 WD_{163} | — | November 21, 2009 | Kitt Peak | Spacewatch | · | 3.2 km | MPC · JPL |
| 231655 | 2009 WW_{164} | — | November 21, 2009 | Kitt Peak | Spacewatch | HYG | 4.0 km | MPC · JPL |
| 231656 | 2009 WT_{165} | — | November 21, 2009 | Kitt Peak | Spacewatch | KOR | 1.8 km | MPC · JPL |
| 231657 | 2009 WE_{166} | — | November 21, 2009 | Kitt Peak | Spacewatch | · | 3.8 km | MPC · JPL |
| 231658 | 2009 WG_{183} | — | November 23, 2009 | Mount Lemmon | Mount Lemmon Survey | · | 850 m | MPC · JPL |
| 231659 | 2009 WE_{237} | — | November 16, 2009 | La Sagra | OAM | · | 3.6 km | MPC · JPL |
| 231660 | 2009 XK_{2} | — | December 11, 2009 | Mayhill | Mayhill | · | 1.3 km | MPC · JPL |
| 231661 | 2009 XQ_{19} | — | December 15, 2009 | Mount Lemmon | Mount Lemmon Survey | · | 4.4 km | MPC · JPL |
| 231662 | 2009 XO_{21} | — | December 10, 2009 | Mount Lemmon | Mount Lemmon Survey | · | 4.0 km | MPC · JPL |
| 231663 | 2009 XA_{22} | — | December 9, 2009 | La Sagra | OAM | EOS | 5.2 km | MPC · JPL |
| 231664 | 2009 YL_{6} | — | December 20, 2009 | Mount Lemmon | Mount Lemmon Survey | L4 | 10 km | MPC · JPL |
| 231665 | 7602 P-L | — | October 17, 1960 | Palomar | C. J. van Houten, I. van Houten-Groeneveld, T. Gehrels | · | 3.5 km | MPC · JPL |
| 231666 Aisymnos | 1960 SX | Aisymnos | September 24, 1960 | Palomar | L. D. Schmadel, Stoss, R. M. | L4 | 13 km | MPC · JPL |
| 231667 | 1981 EU_{5} | — | March 7, 1981 | Siding Spring | S. J. Bus | · | 1.5 km | MPC · JPL |
| 231668 | 1981 EK_{28} | — | March 6, 1981 | Siding Spring | S. J. Bus | EUN | 4.0 km | MPC · JPL |
| 231669 | 1993 FC_{50} | — | March 19, 1993 | La Silla | UESAC | (194) | 2.2 km | MPC · JPL |
| 231670 | 1993 UN_{5} | — | October 20, 1993 | La Silla | E. W. Elst | · | 3.5 km | MPC · JPL |
| 231671 | 1994 AH_{10} | — | January 8, 1994 | Kitt Peak | Spacewatch | · | 2.9 km | MPC · JPL |
| 231672 | 1994 EN_{4} | — | March 5, 1994 | Kitt Peak | Spacewatch | · | 2.0 km | MPC · JPL |
| 231673 | 1994 LD_{6} | — | June 3, 1994 | La Silla | H. Debehogne | · | 2.5 km | MPC · JPL |
| 231674 | 1994 PG_{6} | — | August 10, 1994 | La Silla | E. W. Elst | · | 2.1 km | MPC · JPL |
| 231675 Amandastadermann | 1994 RV_{5} | Amandastadermann | September 12, 1994 | Kitt Peak | Spacewatch | · | 1.1 km | MPC · JPL |
| 231676 | 1995 BU_{10} | — | January 29, 1995 | Kitt Peak | Spacewatch | MAS | 980 m | MPC · JPL |
| 231677 | 1995 FT_{19} | — | March 31, 1995 | Kitt Peak | Spacewatch | MAS | 1.0 km | MPC · JPL |
| 231678 | 1995 QC_{1} | — | August 19, 1995 | Xinglong | SCAP | · | 980 m | MPC · JPL |
| 231679 | 1995 QE_{1} | — | August 19, 1995 | Xinglong | SCAP | · | 3.5 km | MPC · JPL |
| 231680 | 1995 SW_{6} | — | September 17, 1995 | Kitt Peak | Spacewatch | · | 2.3 km | MPC · JPL |
| 231681 | 1995 SX_{39} | — | September 25, 1995 | Kitt Peak | Spacewatch | · | 3.7 km | MPC · JPL |
| 231682 | 1995 UK_{16} | — | October 17, 1995 | Kitt Peak | Spacewatch | · | 2.8 km | MPC · JPL |
| 231683 | 1995 UD_{67} | — | October 18, 1995 | Kitt Peak | Spacewatch | · | 740 m | MPC · JPL |
| 231684 | 1996 BV_{7} | — | January 19, 1996 | Kitt Peak | Spacewatch | · | 3.0 km | MPC · JPL |
| 231685 | 1996 GL_{5} | — | April 11, 1996 | Kitt Peak | Spacewatch | · | 2.8 km | MPC · JPL |
| 231686 | 1996 TG_{16} | — | October 4, 1996 | Kitt Peak | Spacewatch | · | 4.6 km | MPC · JPL |
| 231687 | 1996 TV_{47} | — | October 12, 1996 | Kitt Peak | Spacewatch | · | 2.5 km | MPC · JPL |
| 231688 | 1996 VG_{1} | — | November 7, 1996 | Prescott | P. G. Comba | (5) | 1.5 km | MPC · JPL |
| 231689 | 1996 VV_{37} | — | November 14, 1996 | Kitt Peak | Spacewatch | (5) | 1.3 km | MPC · JPL |
| 231690 | 1997 GA_{29} | — | April 8, 1997 | Kitt Peak | Spacewatch | PAD | 1.9 km | MPC · JPL |
| 231691 | 1997 RX_{10} | — | September 3, 1997 | Caussols | ODAS | · | 3.5 km | MPC · JPL |
| 231692 | 1997 WK_{14} | — | November 22, 1997 | Kitt Peak | Spacewatch | L4 | 10 km | MPC · JPL |
| 231693 | 1998 DR_{33} | — | February 27, 1998 | La Silla | E. W. Elst | · | 3.8 km | MPC · JPL |
| 231694 | 1998 HJ_{16} | — | April 22, 1998 | Kitt Peak | Spacewatch | · | 1.8 km | MPC · JPL |
| 231695 | 1998 HY_{41} | — | April 24, 1998 | Kitt Peak | Spacewatch | · | 1.7 km | MPC · JPL |
| 231696 | 1998 HV_{127} | — | April 18, 1998 | Socorro | LINEAR | ADE | 4.3 km | MPC · JPL |
| 231697 | 1998 MW_{23} | — | June 25, 1998 | Kitt Peak | Spacewatch | · | 2.4 km | MPC · JPL |
| 231698 | 1998 QC_{2} | — | August 19, 1998 | Kleť | M. Tichý, Z. Moravec | · | 4.5 km | MPC · JPL |
| 231699 | 1998 QD_{85} | — | August 24, 1998 | Socorro | LINEAR | · | 2.5 km | MPC · JPL |
| 231700 | 1998 SU_{12} | — | September 23, 1998 | Catalina | CSS | · | 1.7 km | MPC · JPL |

== 231701–231800 ==
back to top

| Designation | | | Discovery | | | Properties | | Ref |
| Permanent | Provisional | Named after | Date | Site | Discoverer(s) | Category | Diam. | Ref |
|---|---|---|---|---|---|---|---|---|
| 231701 | 1998 SB_{21} | — | September 21, 1998 | Kitt Peak | Spacewatch | · | 850 m | MPC · JPL |
| 231702 | 1998 SJ_{45} | — | September 25, 1998 | Kitt Peak | Spacewatch | · | 1 km | MPC · JPL |
| 231703 | 1998 SE_{46} | — | September 25, 1998 | Kitt Peak | Spacewatch | AGN | 1.7 km | MPC · JPL |
| 231704 | 1998 SP_{103} | — | September 26, 1998 | Socorro | LINEAR | · | 1.1 km | MPC · JPL |
| 231705 | 1998 SX_{118} | — | September 26, 1998 | Socorro | LINEAR | · | 4.9 km | MPC · JPL |
| 231706 | 1998 SH_{132} | — | September 26, 1998 | Socorro | LINEAR | BRA | 2.4 km | MPC · JPL |
| 231707 | 1998 TP | — | October 10, 1998 | Goodricke-Pigott | R. A. Tucker | PHO | 2.0 km | MPC · JPL |
| 231708 | 1998 UJ_{11} | — | October 17, 1998 | Kitt Peak | Spacewatch | · | 1.8 km | MPC · JPL |
| 231709 | 1998 UK_{41} | — | October 28, 1998 | Socorro | LINEAR | · | 1.2 km | MPC · JPL |
| 231710 | 1998 UL_{41} | — | October 28, 1998 | Socorro | LINEAR | · | 3.3 km | MPC · JPL |
| 231711 | 1998 VS_{56} | — | November 11, 1998 | Anderson Mesa | LONEOS | · | 1.3 km | MPC · JPL |
| 231712 | 1998 WZ_{4} | — | November 19, 1998 | Catalina | CSS | · | 5.3 km | MPC · JPL |
| 231713 | 1998 YQ_{20} | — | December 25, 1998 | Kitt Peak | Spacewatch | · | 2.5 km | MPC · JPL |
| 231714 | 1999 AZ_{12} | — | January 7, 1999 | Kitt Peak | Spacewatch | · | 4.9 km | MPC · JPL |
| 231715 | 1999 AB_{14} | — | January 8, 1999 | Kitt Peak | Spacewatch | MAS | 800 m | MPC · JPL |
| 231716 | 1999 BT_{2} | — | January 18, 1999 | Oizumi | T. Kobayashi | · | 3.9 km | MPC · JPL |
| 231717 | 1999 CK_{9} | — | February 12, 1999 | Oohira | T. Urata | · | 2.4 km | MPC · JPL |
| 231718 | 1999 CV_{11} | — | February 12, 1999 | Socorro | LINEAR | H | 960 m | MPC · JPL |
| 231719 | 1999 CS_{57} | — | February 10, 1999 | Socorro | LINEAR | · | 1.7 km | MPC · JPL |
| 231720 | 1999 CF_{78} | — | February 12, 1999 | Socorro | LINEAR | · | 3.4 km | MPC · JPL |
| 231721 | 1999 CW_{78} | — | February 12, 1999 | Socorro | LINEAR | · | 4.7 km | MPC · JPL |
| 231722 | 1999 CB_{115} | — | February 12, 1999 | Socorro | LINEAR | · | 3.7 km | MPC · JPL |
| 231723 | 1999 CH_{137} | — | February 9, 1999 | Kitt Peak | Spacewatch | THM | 2.6 km | MPC · JPL |
| 231724 | 1999 CY_{146} | — | February 9, 1999 | Kitt Peak | Spacewatch | MAS | 870 m | MPC · JPL |
| 231725 | 1999 CL_{156} | — | February 8, 1999 | Kitt Peak | Spacewatch | NYS | 1.3 km | MPC · JPL |
| 231726 | 1999 EU | — | March 6, 1999 | Kitt Peak | Spacewatch | · | 1.3 km | MPC · JPL |
| 231727 | 1999 EO_{1} | — | March 6, 1999 | Kitt Peak | Spacewatch | V | 980 m | MPC · JPL |
| 231728 | 1999 EE_{7} | — | March 15, 1999 | Socorro | LINEAR | PHO | 3.5 km | MPC · JPL |
| 231729 | 1999 ER_{14} | — | March 14, 1999 | Kitt Peak | Spacewatch | · | 4.3 km | MPC · JPL |
| 231730 | 1999 FL_{12} | — | March 18, 1999 | Kitt Peak | Spacewatch | MAS | 930 m | MPC · JPL |
| 231731 | 1999 FT_{66} | — | March 20, 1999 | Apache Point | SDSS | · | 2.5 km | MPC · JPL |
| 231732 | 1999 GD_{7} | — | April 15, 1999 | Bergisch Gladbach | W. Bickel | · | 1.9 km | MPC · JPL |
| 231733 | 1999 GU_{54} | — | April 6, 1999 | Kitt Peak | Spacewatch | NYS | 1.6 km | MPC · JPL |
| 231734 | 1999 KQ_{2} | — | May 16, 1999 | Kitt Peak | Spacewatch | MAS | 900 m | MPC · JPL |
| 231735 | 1999 LE_{15} | — | June 12, 1999 | Socorro | LINEAR | · | 6.4 km | MPC · JPL |
| 231736 | 1999 MD | — | June 16, 1999 | Kitt Peak | Spacewatch | HYG | 4.3 km | MPC · JPL |
| 231737 | 1999 NA_{54} | — | July 12, 1999 | Socorro | LINEAR | · | 3.2 km | MPC · JPL |
| 231738 | 1999 RK_{24} | — | September 7, 1999 | Socorro | LINEAR | · | 2.5 km | MPC · JPL |
| 231739 | 1999 RA_{106} | — | September 8, 1999 | Socorro | LINEAR | · | 2.7 km | MPC · JPL |
| 231740 | 1999 RD_{111} | — | September 8, 1999 | Socorro | LINEAR | · | 3.1 km | MPC · JPL |
| 231741 | 1999 RX_{141} | — | September 9, 1999 | Socorro | LINEAR | · | 2.7 km | MPC · JPL |
| 231742 | 1999 RC_{156} | — | September 9, 1999 | Socorro | LINEAR | · | 4.2 km | MPC · JPL |
| 231743 | 1999 RL_{168} | — | September 9, 1999 | Socorro | LINEAR | · | 2.6 km | MPC · JPL |
| 231744 | 1999 RT_{195} | — | September 8, 1999 | Socorro | LINEAR | EUN | 2.1 km | MPC · JPL |
| 231745 | 1999 RR_{214} | — | September 15, 1999 | Kleť | Kleť | HIL · 3:2 | 7.5 km | MPC · JPL |
| 231746 | 1999 TO_{49} | — | October 4, 1999 | Kitt Peak | Spacewatch | · | 1.8 km | MPC · JPL |
| 231747 | 1999 TF_{52} | — | October 4, 1999 | Kitt Peak | Spacewatch | · | 2.0 km | MPC · JPL |
| 231748 | 1999 TR_{137} | — | October 6, 1999 | Socorro | LINEAR | (5) | 1.2 km | MPC · JPL |
| 231749 | 1999 TN_{152} | — | October 7, 1999 | Socorro | LINEAR | T_{j} (2.96) | 6.7 km | MPC · JPL |
| 231750 | 1999 TE_{158} | — | October 7, 1999 | Socorro | LINEAR | · | 1 km | MPC · JPL |
| 231751 | 1999 TA_{167} | — | October 10, 1999 | Socorro | LINEAR | · | 3.1 km | MPC · JPL |
| 231752 | 1999 TF_{173} | — | October 10, 1999 | Socorro | LINEAR | · | 3.6 km | MPC · JPL |
| 231753 | 1999 TA_{199} | — | October 12, 1999 | Socorro | LINEAR | · | 800 m | MPC · JPL |
| 231754 | 1999 TL_{202} | — | October 13, 1999 | Socorro | LINEAR | · | 3.2 km | MPC · JPL |
| 231755 | 1999 TP_{249} | — | October 9, 1999 | Catalina | CSS | · | 3.0 km | MPC · JPL |
| 231756 | 1999 TP_{269} | — | October 3, 1999 | Socorro | LINEAR | · | 3.3 km | MPC · JPL |
| 231757 | 1999 TJ_{319} | — | October 9, 1999 | Socorro | LINEAR | · | 2.6 km | MPC · JPL |
| 231758 | 1999 TO_{320} | — | October 10, 1999 | Socorro | LINEAR | · | 3.3 km | MPC · JPL |
| 231759 | 1999 TX_{320} | — | October 10, 1999 | Socorro | LINEAR | · | 4.3 km | MPC · JPL |
| 231760 | 1999 UP_{11} | — | October 31, 1999 | Socorro | LINEAR | EUN | 2.0 km | MPC · JPL |
| 231761 | 1999 UE_{21} | — | October 31, 1999 | Kitt Peak | Spacewatch | · | 2.0 km | MPC · JPL |
| 231762 | 1999 UT_{21} | — | October 31, 1999 | Kitt Peak | Spacewatch | · | 1.7 km | MPC · JPL |
| 231763 | 1999 UH_{36} | — | October 16, 1999 | Kitt Peak | Spacewatch | · | 2.5 km | MPC · JPL |
| 231764 | 1999 VB_{24} | — | November 8, 1999 | Costitx | R. Pacheco, Á. López J. | DOR | 4.4 km | MPC · JPL |
| 231765 | 1999 VH_{44} | — | November 3, 1999 | Catalina | CSS | · | 2.6 km | MPC · JPL |
| 231766 | 1999 VL_{74} | — | November 4, 1999 | Kitt Peak | Spacewatch | · | 1.5 km | MPC · JPL |
| 231767 | 1999 VS_{98} | — | November 9, 1999 | Socorro | LINEAR | · | 2.2 km | MPC · JPL |
| 231768 | 1999 VR_{118} | — | November 9, 1999 | Kitt Peak | Spacewatch | KOR | 1.6 km | MPC · JPL |
| 231769 | 1999 VS_{150} | — | November 14, 1999 | Socorro | LINEAR | · | 3.1 km | MPC · JPL |
| 231770 | 1999 VX_{151} | — | November 9, 1999 | Kitt Peak | Spacewatch | AST | 3.0 km | MPC · JPL |
| 231771 | 1999 VW_{154} | — | November 13, 1999 | Kitt Peak | Spacewatch | · | 2.7 km | MPC · JPL |
| 231772 | 1999 VY_{185} | — | November 15, 1999 | Socorro | LINEAR | · | 2.8 km | MPC · JPL |
| 231773 | 1999 VP_{189} | — | November 15, 1999 | Socorro | LINEAR | · | 2.1 km | MPC · JPL |
| 231774 | 1999 WH_{12} | — | November 28, 1999 | Kitt Peak | Spacewatch | · | 910 m | MPC · JPL |
| 231775 | 1999 XM_{10} | — | December 5, 1999 | Catalina | CSS | · | 2.9 km | MPC · JPL |
| 231776 | 1999 XM_{127} | — | December 10, 1999 | Eskridge | G. Hug, G. Bell | · | 1.1 km | MPC · JPL |
| 231777 | 1999 XM_{128} | — | December 7, 1999 | Socorro | LINEAR | · | 1.0 km | MPC · JPL |
| 231778 | 1999 XQ_{217} | — | December 13, 1999 | Kitt Peak | Spacewatch | · | 780 m | MPC · JPL |
| 231779 | 2000 AT_{5} | — | January 3, 2000 | Kitt Peak | Spacewatch | PHO | 1.5 km | MPC · JPL |
| 231780 | 2000 BW_{40} | — | January 29, 2000 | Kitt Peak | Spacewatch | KOR | 1.7 km | MPC · JPL |
| 231781 | 2000 CO_{7} | — | February 2, 2000 | Socorro | LINEAR | · | 3.4 km | MPC · JPL |
| 231782 | 2000 CV_{14} | — | February 2, 2000 | Socorro | LINEAR | · | 1.7 km | MPC · JPL |
| 231783 | 2000 CR_{15} | — | February 2, 2000 | Socorro | LINEAR | · | 4.6 km | MPC · JPL |
| 231784 | 2000 CA_{24} | — | February 2, 2000 | Socorro | LINEAR | · | 5.7 km | MPC · JPL |
| 231785 | 2000 CF_{40} | — | February 4, 2000 | Socorro | LINEAR | · | 1.1 km | MPC · JPL |
| 231786 | 2000 CU_{97} | — | February 9, 2000 | Siding Spring | R. H. McNaught | · | 870 m | MPC · JPL |
| 231787 | 2000 CW_{99} | — | February 8, 2000 | Kitt Peak | Spacewatch | · | 1.0 km | MPC · JPL |
| 231788 | 2000 CH_{101} | — | February 12, 2000 | Kitt Peak | Spacewatch | KOR | 1.7 km | MPC · JPL |
| 231789 | 2000 CA_{131} | — | February 3, 2000 | Kitt Peak | Spacewatch | KOR | 1.8 km | MPC · JPL |
| 231790 | 2000 CH_{134} | — | February 4, 2000 | Kitt Peak | Spacewatch | · | 2.1 km | MPC · JPL |
| 231791 | 2000 DB_{5} | — | February 28, 2000 | Socorro | LINEAR | · | 4.8 km | MPC · JPL |
| 231792 | 2000 DH_{8} | — | February 26, 2000 | Catalina | CSS | AMO | 710 m | MPC · JPL |
| 231793 | 2000 DX_{8} | — | February 26, 2000 | Kitt Peak | Spacewatch | NAE | 2.9 km | MPC · JPL |
| 231794 | 2000 DW_{13} | — | February 28, 2000 | Kitt Peak | Spacewatch | · | 1.1 km | MPC · JPL |
| 231795 | 2000 DT_{62} | — | February 29, 2000 | Socorro | LINEAR | · | 770 m | MPC · JPL |
| 231796 | 2000 DU_{63} | — | February 29, 2000 | Socorro | LINEAR | · | 1.1 km | MPC · JPL |
| 231797 | 2000 DB_{92} | — | February 27, 2000 | Kitt Peak | Spacewatch | PHO | 1.3 km | MPC · JPL |
| 231798 | 2000 EP_{2} | — | March 3, 2000 | Socorro | LINEAR | · | 1.4 km | MPC · JPL |
| 231799 | 2000 EW_{9} | — | March 3, 2000 | Socorro | LINEAR | · | 5.3 km | MPC · JPL |
| 231800 | 2000 ES_{19} | — | March 5, 2000 | Socorro | LINEAR | (13314) | 3.1 km | MPC · JPL |

== 231801–231900 ==
back to top

| Designation | | | Discovery | | | Properties | | Ref |
| Permanent | Provisional | Named after | Date | Site | Discoverer(s) | Category | Diam. | Ref |
|---|---|---|---|---|---|---|---|---|
| 231801 | 2000 EB_{20} | — | March 6, 2000 | Višnjan | K. Korlević | · | 2.1 km | MPC · JPL |
| 231802 | 2000 ED_{52} | — | March 3, 2000 | Kitt Peak | Spacewatch | · | 2.0 km | MPC · JPL |
| 231803 | 2000 ES_{96} | — | March 12, 2000 | Socorro | LINEAR | · | 3.7 km | MPC · JPL |
| 231804 | 2000 EJ_{106} | — | March 11, 2000 | Anderson Mesa | LONEOS | · | 5.7 km | MPC · JPL |
| 231805 | 2000 EQ_{115} | — | March 10, 2000 | Kitt Peak | Spacewatch | · | 4.9 km | MPC · JPL |
| 231806 | 2000 EH_{123} | — | March 11, 2000 | Anderson Mesa | LONEOS | · | 3.5 km | MPC · JPL |
| 231807 | 2000 EZ_{146} | — | March 4, 2000 | Socorro | LINEAR | · | 6.6 km | MPC · JPL |
| 231808 | 2000 ES_{166} | — | March 4, 2000 | Socorro | LINEAR | · | 6.2 km | MPC · JPL |
| 231809 | 2000 FP_{22} | — | March 29, 2000 | Socorro | LINEAR | · | 3.7 km | MPC · JPL |
| 231810 | 2000 FX_{28} | — | March 27, 2000 | Anderson Mesa | LONEOS | · | 1.4 km | MPC · JPL |
| 231811 | 2000 GQ_{21} | — | April 5, 2000 | Socorro | LINEAR | EOS | 2.6 km | MPC · JPL |
| 231812 | 2000 GV_{25} | — | April 5, 2000 | Socorro | LINEAR | · | 2.9 km | MPC · JPL |
| 231813 | 2000 GJ_{43} | — | April 5, 2000 | Socorro | LINEAR | · | 2.5 km | MPC · JPL |
| 231814 | 2000 GT_{74} | — | April 5, 2000 | Socorro | LINEAR | · | 3.0 km | MPC · JPL |
| 231815 | 2000 GQ_{118} | — | April 3, 2000 | Kitt Peak | Spacewatch | · | 1.3 km | MPC · JPL |
| 231816 | 2000 GC_{145} | — | April 7, 2000 | Kitt Peak | Spacewatch | THM | 3.2 km | MPC · JPL |
| 231817 | 2000 GH_{150} | — | April 5, 2000 | Socorro | LINEAR | · | 4.7 km | MPC · JPL |
| 231818 | 2000 GX_{150} | — | April 5, 2000 | Socorro | LINEAR | V | 700 m | MPC · JPL |
| 231819 | 2000 HH_{80} | — | April 28, 2000 | Anderson Mesa | LONEOS | · | 5.0 km | MPC · JPL |
| 231820 | 2000 HH_{96} | — | April 28, 2000 | Anderson Mesa | LONEOS | · | 2.1 km | MPC · JPL |
| 231821 | 2000 HS_{96} | — | April 28, 2000 | Anderson Mesa | LONEOS | PHO | 3.7 km | MPC · JPL |
| 231822 | 2000 HP_{103} | — | April 27, 2000 | Anderson Mesa | LONEOS | · | 4.2 km | MPC · JPL |
| 231823 | 2000 JL_{6} | — | May 3, 2000 | Socorro | LINEAR | · | 5.9 km | MPC · JPL |
| 231824 | 2000 JU_{44} | — | May 7, 2000 | Socorro | LINEAR | EOS | 3.6 km | MPC · JPL |
| 231825 | 2000 JW_{75} | — | May 6, 2000 | Socorro | LINEAR | · | 1.4 km | MPC · JPL |
| 231826 | 2000 JW_{91} | — | May 4, 2000 | Apache Point | SDSS | EOS | 3.0 km | MPC · JPL |
| 231827 | 2000 KG_{49} | — | May 30, 2000 | Kitt Peak | Spacewatch | THM | 3.1 km | MPC · JPL |
| 231828 | 2000 KV_{59} | — | May 25, 2000 | Anderson Mesa | LONEOS | · | 5.9 km | MPC · JPL |
| 231829 | 2000 KZ_{65} | — | May 27, 2000 | Anderson Mesa | LONEOS | · | 4.0 km | MPC · JPL |
| 231830 | 2000 LW_{1} | — | June 4, 2000 | Socorro | LINEAR | · | 2.3 km | MPC · JPL |
| 231831 | 2000 OR_{10} | — | July 23, 2000 | Socorro | LINEAR | · | 3.1 km | MPC · JPL |
| 231832 Briankeeney | 2000 OG_{69} | Briankeeney | July 31, 2000 | Cerro Tololo | M. W. Buie | NYS | 1.3 km | MPC · JPL |
| 231833 | 2000 PK_{27} | — | August 3, 2000 | Kitt Peak | Spacewatch | · | 7.0 km | MPC · JPL |
| 231834 | 2000 QC_{2} | — | August 24, 2000 | Socorro | LINEAR | H | 890 m | MPC · JPL |
| 231835 | 2000 QS_{11} | — | August 24, 2000 | Socorro | LINEAR | (5) | 1.9 km | MPC · JPL |
| 231836 | 2000 QV_{112} | — | August 24, 2000 | Socorro | LINEAR | · | 2.1 km | MPC · JPL |
| 231837 | 2000 QD_{117} | — | August 29, 2000 | Socorro | LINEAR | · | 2.3 km | MPC · JPL |
| 231838 | 2000 QA_{161} | — | August 31, 2000 | Socorro | LINEAR | EUN | 5.5 km | MPC · JPL |
| 231839 | 2000 QX_{164} | — | August 31, 2000 | Socorro | LINEAR | · | 2.0 km | MPC · JPL |
| 231840 | 2000 QZ_{225} | — | August 31, 2000 | Goodricke-Pigott | R. A. Tucker | · | 3.6 km | MPC · JPL |
| 231841 Danielkatz | 2000 QT_{232} | Danielkatz | August 25, 2000 | Cerro Tololo | M. W. Buie | MAS | 890 m | MPC · JPL |
| 231842 Graemekeleher | 2000 QW_{242} | Graemekeleher | August 27, 2000 | Cerro Tololo | M. W. Buie | · | 1.5 km | MPC · JPL |
| 231843 | 2000 RZ_{62} | — | September 2, 2000 | Socorro | LINEAR | · | 2.1 km | MPC · JPL |
| 231844 | 2000 RZ_{74} | — | September 3, 2000 | Socorro | LINEAR | · | 5.8 km | MPC · JPL |
| 231845 | 2000 RV_{81} | — | September 1, 2000 | Socorro | LINEAR | · | 2.4 km | MPC · JPL |
| 231846 | 2000 RC_{85} | — | September 2, 2000 | Anderson Mesa | LONEOS | · | 2.2 km | MPC · JPL |
| 231847 | 2000 RJ_{87} | — | September 2, 2000 | Anderson Mesa | LONEOS | · | 1.8 km | MPC · JPL |
| 231848 | 2000 SR_{31} | — | September 24, 2000 | Socorro | LINEAR | · | 1.1 km | MPC · JPL |
| 231849 | 2000 SB_{41} | — | September 24, 2000 | Socorro | LINEAR | THM | 5.6 km | MPC · JPL |
| 231850 | 2000 SB_{48} | — | September 23, 2000 | Socorro | LINEAR | · | 2.2 km | MPC · JPL |
| 231851 | 2000 SV_{61} | — | September 24, 2000 | Socorro | LINEAR | NYS | 1.6 km | MPC · JPL |
| 231852 | 2000 SX_{94} | — | September 23, 2000 | Socorro | LINEAR | · | 2.1 km | MPC · JPL |
| 231853 | 2000 SK_{100} | — | September 23, 2000 | Socorro | LINEAR | · | 1.8 km | MPC · JPL |
| 231854 | 2000 SE_{130} | — | September 22, 2000 | Socorro | LINEAR | · | 2.0 km | MPC · JPL |
| 231855 | 2000 SF_{138} | — | September 23, 2000 | Socorro | LINEAR | · | 1.9 km | MPC · JPL |
| 231856 | 2000 SJ_{138} | — | September 23, 2000 | Socorro | LINEAR | · | 1.9 km | MPC · JPL |
| 231857 | 2000 SB_{154} | — | September 24, 2000 | Socorro | LINEAR | · | 2.7 km | MPC · JPL |
| 231858 | 2000 SZ_{165} | — | September 23, 2000 | Socorro | LINEAR | · | 3.1 km | MPC · JPL |
| 231859 | 2000 SM_{167} | — | September 23, 2000 | Socorro | LINEAR | · | 1.9 km | MPC · JPL |
| 231860 | 2000 SZ_{185} | — | September 21, 2000 | Kitt Peak | Spacewatch | · | 1.4 km | MPC · JPL |
| 231861 | 2000 SO_{236} | — | September 24, 2000 | Socorro | LINEAR | · | 2.1 km | MPC · JPL |
| 231862 | 2000 SC_{251} | — | September 24, 2000 | Socorro | LINEAR | · | 1.3 km | MPC · JPL |
| 231863 | 2000 SJ_{261} | — | September 24, 2000 | Socorro | LINEAR | (5) | 1.4 km | MPC · JPL |
| 231864 | 2000 SD_{272} | — | September 28, 2000 | Socorro | LINEAR | · | 2.2 km | MPC · JPL |
| 231865 | 2000 SY_{318} | — | September 26, 2000 | Socorro | LINEAR | · | 3.2 km | MPC · JPL |
| 231866 | 2000 SF_{319} | — | September 26, 2000 | Socorro | LINEAR | MAR | 3.2 km | MPC · JPL |
| 231867 | 2000 SW_{346} | — | September 27, 2000 | Socorro | LINEAR | · | 3.4 km | MPC · JPL |
| 231868 | 2000 SY_{354} | — | September 29, 2000 | Anderson Mesa | LONEOS | · | 2.4 km | MPC · JPL |
| 231869 | 2000 SG_{364} | — | September 20, 2000 | Socorro | LINEAR | · | 1.7 km | MPC · JPL |
| 231870 | 2000 SZ_{364} | — | September 21, 2000 | Anderson Mesa | LONEOS | ULA · CYB | 9.0 km | MPC · JPL |
| 231871 | 2000 TD_{13} | — | October 1, 2000 | Socorro | LINEAR | · | 3.5 km | MPC · JPL |
| 231872 | 2000 TJ_{25} | — | October 2, 2000 | Socorro | LINEAR | T_{j} (2.96) · 3:2 | 6.2 km | MPC · JPL |
| 231873 | 2000 TB_{52} | — | October 1, 2000 | Socorro | LINEAR | · | 1.4 km | MPC · JPL |
| 231874 | 2000 UP_{3} | — | October 24, 2000 | Socorro | LINEAR | · | 1.8 km | MPC · JPL |
| 231875 | 2000 UZ_{15} | — | October 24, 2000 | Socorro | LINEAR | · | 4.2 km | MPC · JPL |
| 231876 | 2000 UV_{43} | — | October 24, 2000 | Socorro | LINEAR | · | 1.9 km | MPC · JPL |
| 231877 | 2000 UH_{66} | — | October 25, 2000 | Socorro | LINEAR | (5) | 1.6 km | MPC · JPL |
| 231878 | 2000 UC_{77} | — | October 24, 2000 | Socorro | LINEAR | · | 2.0 km | MPC · JPL |
| 231879 | 2000 UA_{93} | — | October 25, 2000 | Socorro | LINEAR | V | 1.1 km | MPC · JPL |
| 231880 | 2000 UU_{112} | — | October 21, 2000 | Kitt Peak | Spacewatch | · | 1.6 km | MPC · JPL |
| 231881 | 2000 UF_{114} | — | October 25, 2000 | Socorro | LINEAR | · | 1.4 km | MPC · JPL |
| 231882 | 2000 VO | — | November 1, 2000 | Kitt Peak | Spacewatch | (5) | 1.3 km | MPC · JPL |
| 231883 | 2000 VS_{2} | — | November 2, 2000 | Ondřejov | P. Kušnirák, P. Pravec | (5) | 1.6 km | MPC · JPL |
| 231884 | 2000 VE_{6} | — | November 1, 2000 | Socorro | LINEAR | · | 2.2 km | MPC · JPL |
| 231885 | 2000 VH_{15} | — | November 1, 2000 | Socorro | LINEAR | · | 2.6 km | MPC · JPL |
| 231886 | 2000 VK_{26} | — | November 1, 2000 | Socorro | LINEAR | · | 1.7 km | MPC · JPL |
| 231887 | 2000 VR_{48} | — | November 2, 2000 | Socorro | LINEAR | · | 2.1 km | MPC · JPL |
| 231888 | 2000 VR_{57} | — | November 3, 2000 | Socorro | LINEAR | · | 2.2 km | MPC · JPL |
| 231889 | 2000 WW_{14} | — | November 20, 2000 | Socorro | LINEAR | · | 2.5 km | MPC · JPL |
| 231890 | 2000 WM_{39} | — | November 20, 2000 | Socorro | LINEAR | JUN | 1.5 km | MPC · JPL |
| 231891 | 2000 WJ_{42} | — | November 21, 2000 | Socorro | LINEAR | · | 1.7 km | MPC · JPL |
| 231892 | 2000 WG_{70} | — | November 19, 2000 | Socorro | LINEAR | · | 1.9 km | MPC · JPL |
| 231893 | 2000 WS_{73} | — | November 20, 2000 | Socorro | LINEAR | ADE | 4.6 km | MPC · JPL |
| 231894 | 2000 WN_{85} | — | November 20, 2000 | Socorro | LINEAR | · | 3.3 km | MPC · JPL |
| 231895 | 2000 WU_{113} | — | November 20, 2000 | Socorro | LINEAR | · | 2.4 km | MPC · JPL |
| 231896 | 2000 WY_{117} | — | November 20, 2000 | Socorro | LINEAR | · | 3.3 km | MPC · JPL |
| 231897 | 2000 WM_{138} | — | November 21, 2000 | Socorro | LINEAR | DOR | 3.4 km | MPC · JPL |
| 231898 | 2000 WX_{147} | — | November 28, 2000 | Kitt Peak | Spacewatch | · | 2.2 km | MPC · JPL |
| 231899 | 2000 WX_{156} | — | November 30, 2000 | Socorro | LINEAR | · | 2.4 km | MPC · JPL |
| 231900 | 2000 WT_{180} | — | November 29, 2000 | Anderson Mesa | LONEOS | · | 5.0 km | MPC · JPL |

== 231901–232000 ==
back to top

| Designation | | | Discovery | | | Properties | | Ref |
| Permanent | Provisional | Named after | Date | Site | Discoverer(s) | Category | Diam. | Ref |
|---|---|---|---|---|---|---|---|---|
| 231901 | 2000 XV_{22} | — | December 4, 2000 | Socorro | LINEAR | ADE | 4.3 km | MPC · JPL |
| 231902 | 2000 XO_{26} | — | December 4, 2000 | Socorro | LINEAR | MAR | 2.0 km | MPC · JPL |
| 231903 | 2000 XT_{39} | — | December 4, 2000 | Socorro | LINEAR | · | 3.9 km | MPC · JPL |
| 231904 | 2000 XY_{50} | — | December 6, 2000 | Socorro | LINEAR | · | 3.8 km | MPC · JPL |
| 231905 | 2000 YL | — | December 16, 2000 | Socorro | LINEAR | PHO | 4.2 km | MPC · JPL |
| 231906 | 2000 YN_{9} | — | December 22, 2000 | Kitt Peak | Spacewatch | · | 1.8 km | MPC · JPL |
| 231907 | 2000 YX_{39} | — | December 30, 2000 | Socorro | LINEAR | · | 2.8 km | MPC · JPL |
| 231908 | 2000 YP_{47} | — | December 30, 2000 | Socorro | LINEAR | · | 4.5 km | MPC · JPL |
| 231909 | 2000 YY_{72} | — | December 30, 2000 | Socorro | LINEAR | T_{j} (2.99) · 3:2 | 6.5 km | MPC · JPL |
| 231910 | 2000 YU_{91} | — | December 30, 2000 | Socorro | LINEAR | · | 4.1 km | MPC · JPL |
| 231911 | 2000 YW_{92} | — | December 30, 2000 | Socorro | LINEAR | ADE | 4.3 km | MPC · JPL |
| 231912 | 2000 YP_{108} | — | December 30, 2000 | Socorro | LINEAR | · | 2.3 km | MPC · JPL |
| 231913 | 2000 YH_{138} | — | December 26, 2000 | Haleakala | NEAT | T_{j} (2.92) | 5.7 km | MPC · JPL |
| 231914 | 2000 YT_{140} | — | December 19, 2000 | Kitt Peak | Deep Lens Survey | · | 2.5 km | MPC · JPL |
| 231915 | 2001 AJ | — | January 1, 2001 | Kitt Peak | Spacewatch | · | 2.3 km | MPC · JPL |
| 231916 | 2001 AS_{45} | — | January 15, 2001 | Socorro | LINEAR | JUN | 1.5 km | MPC · JPL |
| 231917 | 2001 BZ_{25} | — | January 20, 2001 | Socorro | LINEAR | · | 3.7 km | MPC · JPL |
| 231918 | 2001 BR_{56} | — | January 19, 2001 | Socorro | LINEAR | · | 2.6 km | MPC · JPL |
| 231919 | 2001 BA_{77} | — | January 26, 2001 | Socorro | LINEAR | · | 2.1 km | MPC · JPL |
| 231920 | 2001 BQ_{78} | — | January 23, 2001 | Kitt Peak | Spacewatch | · | 3.1 km | MPC · JPL |
| 231921 | 2001 CK_{16} | — | February 1, 2001 | Socorro | LINEAR | · | 4.5 km | MPC · JPL |
| 231922 | 2001 CX_{25} | — | February 1, 2001 | Socorro | LINEAR | · | 2.7 km | MPC · JPL |
| 231923 | 2001 CY_{32} | — | February 13, 2001 | Socorro | LINEAR | · | 4.2 km | MPC · JPL |
| 231924 | 2001 CL_{37} | — | February 15, 2001 | Kleť | Kleť | · | 3.1 km | MPC · JPL |
| 231925 | 2001 CK_{39} | — | February 13, 2001 | Socorro | LINEAR | · | 4.3 km | MPC · JPL |
| 231926 | 2001 CQ_{49} | — | February 1, 2001 | Socorro | LINEAR | GAL | 2.3 km | MPC · JPL |
| 231927 | 2001 DU_{30} | — | February 17, 2001 | Socorro | LINEAR | · | 4.3 km | MPC · JPL |
| 231928 | 2001 DY_{34} | — | February 19, 2001 | Socorro | LINEAR | · | 2.9 km | MPC · JPL |
| 231929 | 2001 DP_{42} | — | February 19, 2001 | Socorro | LINEAR | MIS | 3.3 km | MPC · JPL |
| 231930 | 2001 DG_{67} | — | February 19, 2001 | Socorro | LINEAR | · | 3.6 km | MPC · JPL |
| 231931 | 2001 DF_{75} | — | February 20, 2001 | Socorro | LINEAR | · | 3.3 km | MPC · JPL |
| 231932 | 2001 DN_{76} | — | February 20, 2001 | Socorro | LINEAR | · | 3.5 km | MPC · JPL |
| 231933 | 2001 DO_{100} | — | February 16, 2001 | Kitt Peak | Spacewatch | · | 3.0 km | MPC · JPL |
| 231934 | 2001 EB_{11} | — | March 2, 2001 | Haleakala | NEAT | · | 1.8 km | MPC · JPL |
| 231935 | 2001 FO | — | March 16, 2001 | Socorro | LINEAR | · | 2.0 km | MPC · JPL |
| 231936 | 2001 FR_{7} | — | March 19, 2001 | Kitt Peak | Spacewatch | · | 2.4 km | MPC · JPL |
| 231937 | 2001 FO_{32} | — | March 23, 2001 | Socorro | LINEAR | APO +1km · PHA | 550 m | MPC · JPL |
| 231938 | 2001 FU_{104} | — | March 18, 2001 | Anderson Mesa | LONEOS | DOR | 3.5 km | MPC · JPL |
| 231939 | 2001 FB_{129} | — | March 30, 2001 | Socorro | LINEAR | · | 2.3 km | MPC · JPL |
| 231940 | 2001 FF_{141} | — | March 23, 2001 | Anderson Mesa | LONEOS | KOR | 2.4 km | MPC · JPL |
| 231941 | 2001 FD_{142} | — | March 23, 2001 | Anderson Mesa | LONEOS | · | 2.6 km | MPC · JPL |
| 231942 | 2001 FP_{170} | — | March 24, 2001 | Anderson Mesa | LONEOS | JUN | 1.9 km | MPC · JPL |
| 231943 | 2001 FM_{172} | — | March 24, 2001 | Haleakala | NEAT | · | 2.0 km | MPC · JPL |
| 231944 | 2001 HC_{44} | — | April 16, 2001 | Anderson Mesa | LONEOS | · | 1.1 km | MPC · JPL |
| 231945 | 2001 HY_{57} | — | April 25, 2001 | Anderson Mesa | LONEOS | · | 2.7 km | MPC · JPL |
| 231946 | 2001 KT_{1} | — | May 18, 2001 | Goodricke-Pigott | R. A. Tucker | · | 2.4 km | MPC · JPL |
| 231947 | 2001 KU_{19} | — | May 22, 2001 | Socorro | LINEAR | · | 4.5 km | MPC · JPL |
| 231948 | 2001 KB_{66} | — | May 22, 2001 | Anderson Mesa | LONEOS | · | 3.0 km | MPC · JPL |
| 231949 | 2001 NY_{5} | — | July 13, 2001 | Palomar | NEAT | · | 4.8 km | MPC · JPL |
| 231950 | 2001 NW_{11} | — | July 13, 2001 | Palomar | NEAT | EMA | 7.0 km | MPC · JPL |
| 231951 | 2001 OY_{6} | — | July 17, 2001 | Anderson Mesa | LONEOS | LIX | 6.1 km | MPC · JPL |
| 231952 | 2001 OS_{15} | — | July 18, 2001 | Palomar | NEAT | · | 1.1 km | MPC · JPL |
| 231953 | 2001 OT_{25} | — | July 18, 2001 | Haleakala | NEAT | · | 4.0 km | MPC · JPL |
| 231954 | 2001 OM_{42} | — | July 22, 2001 | Palomar | NEAT | · | 1.5 km | MPC · JPL |
| 231955 | 2001 OY_{50} | — | July 21, 2001 | Palomar | NEAT | EOS | 3.0 km | MPC · JPL |
| 231956 | 2001 OQ_{58} | — | July 20, 2001 | Palomar | NEAT | · | 2.9 km | MPC · JPL |
| 231957 | 2001 ON_{87} | — | July 29, 2001 | Palomar | NEAT | · | 6.5 km | MPC · JPL |
| 231958 | 2001 PF_{28} | — | August 14, 2001 | Haleakala | NEAT | AEG | 6.2 km | MPC · JPL |
| 231959 | 2001 PT_{57} | — | August 14, 2001 | Haleakala | NEAT | · | 1.5 km | MPC · JPL |
| 231960 | 2001 QA_{3} | — | August 16, 2001 | Socorro | LINEAR | PHO | 1.2 km | MPC · JPL |
| 231961 | 2001 QS_{5} | — | August 16, 2001 | Socorro | LINEAR | · | 1.5 km | MPC · JPL |
| 231962 | 2001 QX_{5} | — | August 16, 2001 | Socorro | LINEAR | · | 5.0 km | MPC · JPL |
| 231963 | 2001 QU_{6} | — | August 16, 2001 | Socorro | LINEAR | · | 1.4 km | MPC · JPL |
| 231964 | 2001 QT_{12} | — | August 16, 2001 | Socorro | LINEAR | · | 2.6 km | MPC · JPL |
| 231965 | 2001 QP_{44} | — | August 16, 2001 | Socorro | LINEAR | · | 1.3 km | MPC · JPL |
| 231966 | 2001 QZ_{45} | — | August 16, 2001 | Socorro | LINEAR | · | 890 m | MPC · JPL |
| 231967 | 2001 QP_{48} | — | August 16, 2001 | Socorro | LINEAR | · | 4.4 km | MPC · JPL |
| 231968 | 2001 QT_{80} | — | August 17, 2001 | Socorro | LINEAR | · | 5.3 km | MPC · JPL |
| 231969 Sebvauclair | 2001 QD_{94} | Sebvauclair | August 24, 2001 | Pic du Midi | Pic du Midi | URS | 4.7 km | MPC · JPL |
| 231970 | 2001 QE_{101} | — | August 17, 2001 | La Palma | Greimel, R. | · | 7.5 km | MPC · JPL |
| 231971 | 2001 QA_{108} | — | August 23, 2001 | Anderson Mesa | LONEOS | NYS | 1.1 km | MPC · JPL |
| 231972 | 2001 QP_{108} | — | August 17, 2001 | Needville | J. Dellinger, P. G. A. Garossino | · | 3.6 km | MPC · JPL |
| 231973 | 2001 QP_{114} | — | August 17, 2001 | Socorro | LINEAR | · | 6.9 km | MPC · JPL |
| 231974 | 2001 QS_{124} | — | August 19, 2001 | Socorro | LINEAR | · | 5.2 km | MPC · JPL |
| 231975 | 2001 QX_{129} | — | August 20, 2001 | Socorro | LINEAR | · | 980 m | MPC · JPL |
| 231976 | 2001 QB_{131} | — | August 20, 2001 | Socorro | LINEAR | · | 6.0 km | MPC · JPL |
| 231977 | 2001 QH_{156} | — | August 23, 2001 | Anderson Mesa | LONEOS | · | 3.5 km | MPC · JPL |
| 231978 | 2001 QV_{173} | — | August 25, 2001 | Socorro | LINEAR | AEG | 5.8 km | MPC · JPL |
| 231979 | 2001 QO_{200} | — | August 22, 2001 | Palomar | NEAT | H | 910 m | MPC · JPL |
| 231980 | 2001 QJ_{208} | — | August 23, 2001 | Anderson Mesa | LONEOS | · | 1.6 km | MPC · JPL |
| 231981 | 2001 QU_{219} | — | August 23, 2001 | Socorro | LINEAR | H | 700 m | MPC · JPL |
| 231982 | 2001 QP_{249} | — | August 24, 2001 | Socorro | LINEAR | NYS | 2.0 km | MPC · JPL |
| 231983 | 2001 QC_{296} | — | August 24, 2001 | Socorro | LINEAR | · | 1.3 km | MPC · JPL |
| 231984 | 2001 QX_{330} | — | August 28, 2001 | Anderson Mesa | LONEOS | · | 1.6 km | MPC · JPL |
| 231985 | 2001 QT_{333} | — | August 27, 2001 | Palomar | NEAT | · | 1.3 km | MPC · JPL |
| 231986 | 2001 RY_{14} | — | September 10, 2001 | Socorro | LINEAR | EUP | 5.5 km | MPC · JPL |
| 231987 | 2001 RV_{29} | — | September 7, 2001 | Socorro | LINEAR | · | 1.3 km | MPC · JPL |
| 231988 | 2001 RC_{31} | — | September 7, 2001 | Socorro | LINEAR | · | 3.7 km | MPC · JPL |
| 231989 | 2001 RJ_{34} | — | September 8, 2001 | Socorro | LINEAR | · | 1.5 km | MPC · JPL |
| 231990 | 2001 RN_{79} | — | September 10, 2001 | Socorro | LINEAR | NYS | 2.0 km | MPC · JPL |
| 231991 | 2001 RE_{101} | — | September 12, 2001 | Socorro | LINEAR | · | 1.7 km | MPC · JPL |
| 231992 | 2001 RK_{102} | — | September 12, 2001 | Socorro | LINEAR | · | 900 m | MPC · JPL |
| 231993 | 2001 RQ_{105} | — | September 12, 2001 | Socorro | LINEAR | · | 3.9 km | MPC · JPL |
| 231994 | 2001 RC_{112} | — | September 12, 2001 | Socorro | LINEAR | THM | 3.4 km | MPC · JPL |
| 231995 | 2001 RO_{151} | — | September 11, 2001 | Anderson Mesa | LONEOS | · | 1.6 km | MPC · JPL |
| 231996 | 2001 SE_{3} | — | September 17, 2001 | Desert Eagle | W. K. Y. Yeung | · | 2.3 km | MPC · JPL |
| 231997 | 2001 SR_{31} | — | September 16, 2001 | Socorro | LINEAR | · | 1.4 km | MPC · JPL |
| 231998 | 2001 ST_{37} | — | September 16, 2001 | Socorro | LINEAR | · | 1.1 km | MPC · JPL |
| 231999 | 2001 SE_{52} | — | September 16, 2001 | Socorro | LINEAR | · | 1.3 km | MPC · JPL |
| 232000 | 2001 SC_{70} | — | September 17, 2001 | Socorro | LINEAR | · | 2.3 km | MPC · JPL |

back to top

== See also ==
- Meanings of minor-planet names: 231001–232000
