= List of Trojan War characters =

This is a list of mythological characters who appear in narratives concerning the Trojan War.

Map of Homeric Greece

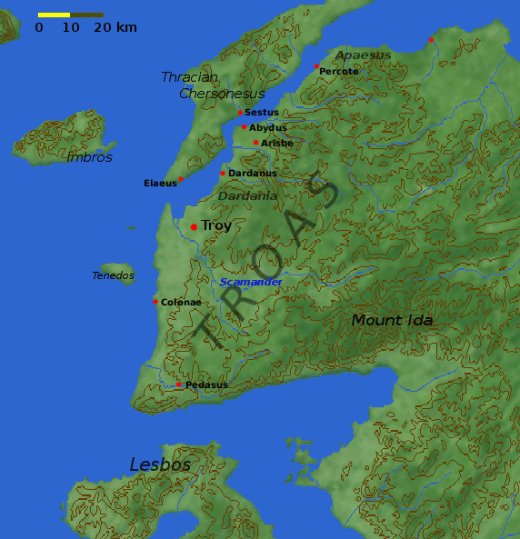
Map of the Troad (Troas)

== Armies ==
Greek armies*		Trojan armies**
Abantes of Euboea	Magnesia	Amazons
Aetolia	Meliboea	Adrasteia
Argos	Minyans	Caria
Athens	Mycenae	Chalybes (Halizones)
Boebe (Thessaly)	Myrmidones	Colonae
Boeotia	Oechalia	Cicones
Calydnian Islands	Ormenius	Dardania
Carpathos	Pherae	Æthiopia
Corinth	Phocis	Lycia
Crete	Phylacia	Maeonia
Cos	Pylos	Mysia
Dulichium	Rhodes	Paionia
Elis	Salamis	Paphlagonia
Elone (Thessaly)	Sicyon	Pelasgians
Enienes	Sparta	Percote
Iolcus (Thessaly)	Syme	Phrygia
Ithaca	Tiryns	Thrace
Ithome	Tricca	Troy
Locris		Zeleia

* See Catalogue of Ships

** See Trojan Battle Order

== Individuals ==
Participants on the Greek side (Achaeans)			Participants on the Trojan side						Other characters
Gods	Achaean Soldiers		Gods	Trojan Soldiers				Amazons	Neutral Gods
Athena	Acamas	Evenor	Aphrodite	Abas (2)	Deicoon	Hysminus	Pasitheus	Ainia	Hades
Hera	Aesymnus	Halaesus	Ares	Ablerus	Deiochus	Iamenus	Pedaeus	Alcibie	Dionysus
Poseidon	Agelaus	Harpalion	Apollo	Adamas	Deioneus	Iapyx	Pedasus	Anchimache	Hestia
Hermes	Alastor	Helenus	Artemis	Admetus	Deiophontes	Idaeus	Peirasus	Andro	Demeter
Hephaestus	Alcimedes	Hippalmus	Deimos	Adrastus	Deiopites	Ilioneus	Peiros	Androdaïxa	
Thetis	Alcimedon	Hippasus	Eris	Aenius	Deiphobus	Imbrasius	Pelagon	Andromache	Other Deities
	Alcimus	Hippomenes	Leto	Aenus	Deisenor	Imbrius	Pelias	Antandre	Alke
Achaean Leaders	Alcmaon	Hipponous	Phobos	Aesepus	Democoon	Ipheus	Perilaus	Antianeira	Anemoi
Achilles	Amphidamas	Hyllus	Scamander	Aethicus	Demoleon	Iphidamas	Perimedes	Antibrote	Arete
Adrastus	Amphilochus	Hypsenor	Simoeis	Aganippus	Demuchus	Iphition (2)	Perimus	Aspidocharme	Dione
Agamemnon	Amphilochus	Iasus	Zeus	Agastrophus	Deucalion	Isus	Periphetes	Bremusa	Enyo
Agapenor	Amphimachus	Iphidamas		Agelaus (3)	Dolon	Itymoneus	Phaenops	Chalcaor	Eos
Ajax the Great	Amphion	Iphinous	Trojan Leaders	Agenor	Dolops	Lamus	Phaestus	Clete	Hebe
Ajax the Lesser	Anchialus	Laogonus	Acamas	Agestratus	Doryclus	Laodamas (2)	Phalces	Clonie	Hypnos
Amarynceus	Andromachus	Leiocritus	Adrestus	Alastor	Dresaeus	Laodocus	Phalerus	Cnemis	Hysminai
Amphimachus	Anticlus	Lernus	Aeneas	Alcaeus	Dresus	Laogonus (2)	Phasis	Derimacheia	Ioke
Antilochus	Antimachus	Leucus	Amphimachus	Alcander	Dryops	Laomedon	Phegeus	Derinoe	Iris
Antiphus	Antiphates	Lycomedes	Amphius	Alcathous	Dymas	Laophoon	Phereclus	Enchesimargos	Keres
Arcesilaus	Antiphus	Lycon	Antiphus	Alcidamas	Echeclus (2)	Lassus	Phleges	Eurylophe	Moros
Ascalaphus	Antitheus	Lycophron	Archilochus	Alcon	Echemmon	Leocritus	Phylacus	Evandre	Oneiroi
Automedon	Aphareus	Mecisteus	Ascanius	Alcyoneus	Echepolus	Lycaon	Phylodamas	Gortyessa	Paeon
Calchas	Aristolochus	Melanippus	Asius	Alexippus	Echius	Lycon	Pidytes	Harmothoe	Pheme
Clonius	Asaeus	Melanthius	Chromius	Amopaon	Eioneus	Lycophontes	Pisander	Hecate	Phonoi
Cyanippus	Autonous	Menesthes	Ennomus	Amphiclus	Elasus	Lyncus	Podes	Helene	Polemos
Diaphorus	Bathycles	Menesthius	Epistrophus	Amphimedon	Elatus	Lysander	Polites	Hippothoe	Thanatos
Diomedes	Bias	Menippus	Euphemus	Amphinous (2)	Eniopeus	Maenalus	Polybus	Iodoce	Nereids
Diores	Bremon	Menoetius	Eurypylus	Amphius	Ennomus	Maris	Polydamas	Ioxeia	Nyx
Elephenor	Bucolion	Molion	Glaucus	Amphoterus	Enyeus	Medon	Polydorus (2)	Oïstrophe	
Epistrophus	Canopus	Molus	Hector	Antiphates	Epaltes	Meilanion	Polyidus	Pharetre	Other Humans
Eumelus	Chromius	Mopsus	Hippothous	Antiphus	Epicles	Melaneus	Polymelus	Polemusa	Aethra
Euryalus	Cleodorus	Mosynus	Memnon	Apisaon	Epistor	Melanippus (3)	Polymnius	Thermodosa	Clymene
Eurybates	Cleolaus	Nesus	Mesthles	Archeptolemus	Epistrophus	Melanthius	Polyphetes	Thorece	Euneus
Eurypylus	Cleon	Noemon	Nastes	Archilochus	Epytus	Meles	Pronous	Toxoanassa	Helen
Eurytus	Coeranus	Odius	Odius	Areilycus	Erylaus	Melius	Proteus	Toxophone	Hemithea
Guneus	Crethon	Oenomaus	Pandarus	Areithous	Erymas (3)	Menalcas	Prothoon		Iliona
Ialmenus	Deileon	Opheltius	Peirous	Aretaon	Eubius	Meneclus	Prytanis	Other Residents	Iphis
Idomeneus	Deiochus	Opites	Penthesilea	Aretus	Eumaeus	Menes	Pylartes (2)	Aesyetes	Polymestor
Leitus	Deipyrus	Oresbius	Phorcys	Asteropaios	Euphorbus	Menoetes	Pylon	Antenor	
Leonteus	Demoleon	Orestes	Pylaemenes	Astyalus	Eurycoon	Menon	Pyrasus	Antimachus	Captives
Machaon	Demoleus	Orsilochus	Pylaeus	Astynous	Eurydamas	Mentes	Pyris	Antiphantes	Aethylla
Medon	Demophon	Orus	Pyraechmes	Astypylus	Eurymenes	Mermerus	Rhipeus	Beroe	Briseis
Meges	Dolops	Otus	Rhesus	Atymnius	Eurynomus	Mimas	Rhigmus	Briseus	Chryseis
Menelaus	Dracius	Palamedes	Sarpedon	Autonous	Eurytion	Mnesaeus	Satnius	Chaon	Cleodice
Menestheus	Dryas	Pandion		Axion	Evenor	Mnesus	Scamandrius	Chloreus	Clytius
Meriones	Dymas	Periphas	Royal Family	Axylus	Evippus	Molion	Schedius	Chryses	Critolaus
Neoptolemus	Echemmon	Periphetes	Agathon	Bienor	Galenus	Morys (2)	Scylaceus	Dares	Deinome
Nestor	Echion	Persinous	Anchises	Cabeirus	Gavius	Mulius (2)	Simoisius	Diores	Diomede
Nireus	Echius	Pheidas	Andromache	Calesius	Glaucus	Mydon (2)	Socus	Elymus	Glauce
Odysseus	Eetion	Pheres	Antiphonus	Caletor	Gorgythion	Mygdon	Sthenelaus	Eumedes	Hecamede
Patroclus	Eilissus	Phereus	Aristomache	Cebriones	Halius	Mynes	Stratus	Eurydamas	Metioche
Peneleos	Eioneus	Pheron	Astyanax	Cebrus	Harmon	Nessus	Thalius	Ilioneus	Xenodice
Pheidippus	Elasippus	Pisander	Astyoche	Celtus	Harpalion	Nirus	Thersilochus	Laocoön	
Philoctetes	Epeius	Promachus	Cassandra	Cestrus	Helenus	Noemon	Thestor (2)	Meges	
Phocus	Epigeus	Sinon	Clytius	Charops	Helicaon	Nychius	Thoas	Phorbas	
Phoenix	Epipole	Stentor	Creusa	Chersidamas	Hellus	Ocythous	Thoon (3)	Phrontis	
Podalirius	Ereuthus	Stichius	Hecuba	Chlemus	Hippocoon	Oenomaus	Thrasius	Pyrgo	
Podarces	Eteoneus	Teuthras	Hicetaon	Chromius	Hippodamas	Oenops	Thrasymelus	Tenes	
Polypoetes	Euchenor	Thersander	Hippodamia	Cleobulus	Hippodamus	Oileus	Thymbraeus	Theano	
Polyxenus	Eudorus	Thersites	Lampus	Clitus	Hippolochus	Ophelestes	Tlepolemus	Tisiphone	
Protesilaus	Eurydamas	Thootes	Laodice	Clydon	Hippomachus	Opheltius	Troilus	Ucalegon	
Prothoenor	Eurymachus	Toxaechmes	Medesicaste	Coeranus	Hippomedon (2)	Orestes	Tros		
Prothous	Eurymedon	Trechus	Mestor	Coön	Hipponous	Ormenus	Xanthus		
Schedius			Paris	Coroebus	Hippotion	Orsilochus	Zechis		
Sthenelus			Polyxena	Corythus	Hyllus	Orthaeus	Zorus		
Talthybius			Priam	Croesmus	Hypanis	Orythaon			
Teucer			Thymoetes	Cycnus	Hypeirochus	Othryoneus			
Thalpius				Daetes	Hypeiron	Palmys			
Thoas				Daetor	Hyperenor	Pammon			
Thrasymedes				Damasus	Hypsenor	Pandocus			
Tlepolemus				Dardanus	Hyrtius	Panthous			

== Deaths and outcome of war ==
This table lists characters killed during the war, and who was responsible for their deaths. Legend: survivors of the war = (✓), unknown fate = (?) and unknown killer or unexplained cause of death = (†)

Achaeans
Leaders	Killers	Leaders	Killers	Soldiers	Killers	Soldiers	Killers	Soldiers	Killers	Soldiers	Killers
Achilles	Paris	Menelaus	✓	Acamas	✓	Cleolaus	Paris	Eurymedon	?	Noemon	?
Adrastus	?	Menestheus	✓	Aesymnus	Hector	Cleon	Polydamas	Evenor	Paris	Odius	?
Agamemnon	✓	Meriones	✓	Agelaus	Hector	Coeranus	Hector	Halaesus	✓	Oenomaus	Hector and Ares
Agapenor	✓	Neoptolemus	✓	Alastor	?	Crethon	Aeneas	Hippasus	Agenor	Opheltius	Hector
Ajax the Great	suicide	Nestor	✓	Alcimedes	?	Deileon	Aeneas	Hippomenes	Agenor	Opites	Hector
Ajax the Lesser	✓	Nireus	Eurypylus	Alcimedon	Aeneas	Deiochus	Paris	Hipponous	Hector	Oresbius	Hector and Ares
Amarynceus	?	Odysseus	✓	Alcimus	Deiphobus	Deipyrus	Helenus	Hyllus	Aeneas	Orestes	Hector and Ares
Amphimachus	Hector	Patroclus	Hector	Alcmaon	Sarpedon	Demoleon	Paris	Hypsenor	Deiphobus	Orsilochus	Aeneas
Antilochus	Hector or Memnon	Peneleos	Eurypylus	Amphidamas	✓	Demoleus	Aeneas	Iasus	Aeneas	Orus	Aeneas
Antiphus	✓	Pheidippus	✓	Amphilochus	Apollo	Demophon	✓	Iphidamas	✓	Otus	Polydamas
Arcesilaus	Hector	Philoctetes	✓	Amphilochus	✓	Dolops	Hector	Iphinous	Glaucus	Palamedes	Odysseus and Diomedes
Ascalaphus	Deiphobus	Phocus	?	Amphimachus	✓	Dracius	?	Laogonus	Derinoe	Pandion	?
Automedon	✓	Phoenix	✓	Amphion	✓	Dryas	Aeneas	Liocritus	Aeneas	Periphas	Ares
Calchas	✓	Podalirius	✓	Anchialus	Hector	Dymas	Deiphobus	Lernus	Penthesilea	Periphetes	Hector
Clonius	Agenor	Podarces	✓ or Penthesilea	Andromachus	Aeneas	Echemmon	Eurypylus	Leucus	Antiphus	Persinous	Penthesilea
Cyanippus	✓	Polypoetes	✓	Anticlus	Odysseus	Echion	†	Lycomedes	?	Pheidas	?
Diaphorus	?	Polyxenus	✓	Antimachus	Aeneas	Echius	Polites	Lycon	Deiphobus	Pheres	Aeneas
Diomedes	✓	Protesilaus	Hector, Aeneas, Euphorbas, Achates, or Cycnus	Antiphates	✓	Eetion	Paris	Lycophron	Hector	Phereus	?
Diores	Peiros	Prothoenor	Polydamas	Antiphus	✓	Eilissus	Penthesilea	Mecisteus	Polydamas	Pheron	Memnon
Elephenor	Agenor	Prothous	✓	Antiphus	Eurypylus	Eioneus	Hector	Melanippus	?	Phorcys	Paris
Epistrophus	Hector	Schedius	Hector	Antitheus	Penthesilea	Elasippus	Hector	Melanthius	?	Pisander	?
Eumelus	✓	Sthenelus	✓	Aphareus	Aeneas	Epeius	✓	Menesthes	Hector	Promachus	Acamas
Idomeneus	✓	Talthybius	✓	Aristolochus	Aeneas	Epigeus	Hector	Menesthius	?	Sinon	?
Leitus	✓	Teucer	✓	Asaeus	Hector	Epipole	Palamedes	Menesthius	Paris	Stentor	?
Leonteus	✓	Thalpius	✓	Autonous	Hector	Ereuthus	Memnon	Menippus	Clonie	Stichius	Hector
Machaon	Eurypylus or Penthesilia	Thoas	✓	Bathycles	Glaucus	Eteoneus	✓	Menoetius	Eurypylus	Teuthras	Hector and Ares
Medon	Aeneas	Thrasymedes	✓	Bias	?	Euchenor	Paris	Molion	Penthesilea	Thersander	✓ or Telephus
Meges	✓ or †	Tlepolemus	Sarpedon	Bremon	Aeneas	Eudorus	?	Molus	Agenor	Thersites	Achilles
				Bucolion	Eurypylus	Eurydamas	Pelias	Mopsus	✓	Thootes	?
				Canopus	✓	Eurymachus	Polydamas	Mosynus	Paris	Toxaechmes	Aeneas
				Chromius	Eurypylus	Eurymachus	✓	Nesus	Eurypylus	Trechus	Hector and Ares
				Cleodorus	Paris						

Trojans
Leaders	Killers	Soldiers	Killers	Soldiers	Killers	Soldiers	Killers	Soldiers	Killers
Acamas	Ajax the Greater	Abas	Diomedes	Dolops	Menelaus	Lysander	Ajax the Greater	Proteus	Odysseus
Adrestus	Diomedes	Abas	Sthenelus	Doryclus	Ajax the Greater	Maenalus	Odysseus	Prothoon	Ajax the Greater
Aeneas	✓	Ablerus	Antilochus	Dresaeus	Polypoetes	Maris	Thrasymedes	Prytanis	Odysseus
Amphimachus	Achilles	Adamas	Meriones	Dresus	Euryalus	Medon	Philoctetes	Pylartes	Patroclus
Amphius	Diomedes	Admetus	Philoctetes	Dryops	Achilles	Meilanion	Antiphus	Pylartes	Ajax the Greater
Antiphus	?	Adrastus	Patroclus	Dymas	†	Melaneus	Neoptolemus	Pylon	Polypoetes
Archilochus	Ajax the Greater	Aenius	Achilles	Echeclus	Achilles	Melanippus	Antilochus	Pyrasus	Ajax the Greater
Ascanius	?	Aenus	Odysseus	Echeclus	Patroclus	Melanippus	Patroclus	Pyris	Patroclus
Asius	Meriones	Aesepus	Euryalus	Echemmon	Diomedes	Melanippus	Teucer	Rhipeus	†
Chromius	Odysseus	Aethicus	?	Echepolus	Antilochus	Melanthius	Eurypylus	Rhigmus	Achilles
Ennomus	Odysseus	Aganippus	Ajax the Greater	Echius	Patroclus	Meles	Euryalus	Satnius	Ajax the Lesser
Epistrophus	Achilles	Agastrophus	Diomedes	Eioneus	Neoptolemus	Melius	Agamemnon	Scamandrius	Menelaus
Euphemus	?	Agelaus	Diomedes	Elasus	Patroclus	Menalcas	Neoptolemus	Schedius	Neoptolemus
Eurypylus	Neoptolemus	Agelaus	Meges	Elatus	Agamemnon	Meneclus	Nestor	Scylaceus	✓
Glaucus	Ajax the Greater	Agelaus	Ajax the Greater	Eniopeus	Diomedes	Menes	Neoptolemus	Simoisius	Ajax the Greater
Hector	Achilles	Agenor	Neoptolemus	Ennomus	Neoptolemus	Menoetes	Teucer	Socus	Odysseus
Hippothous	Ajax the Greater	Agestratus	Ajax the Greater	Enyeus	Ajax the Greater	Menoetes	Achilles	Sthenelaus	Patroclus
Memnon	Achilles	Alastor	Odysseus	Epaltes	Patroclus	Menon	Leonteus	Stratus	Agamemnon
Mesthles	?	Alcaeus	Meges	Epicles	Ajax the Greater	Menon	Diomedes	Thalius	Achilles
Nastes	Achilles	Alcander	Odysseus	Epistor	Patroclus	Mentes	Achilles	Thersilochus	Achilles
Odius	Agamemnon	Alcathous	Idomeneus	Epistrophus	Achilles	Mermerus	Antilochus	Thestor	Patroclus
Pandarus	Diomedes	Alcidamas	Neoptolemus	Epytus	†	Mimas	Idomeneus	Thestor	Ajax the Greater
Peirous	Thoas	Alcon	Odysseus	Erylaus	Patroclus	Mnesaeus	Neoptolemus	Thoas	Menelaus
Penthesilea	Achilles	Alcyoneus	Memnon	Erymas	Idomeneus	Mnesus	Achilles	Thoon	Diomedes
Phorcys	Ajax the Greater	Alexippus	Memnon	Erymas	Patroclus	Molion	Odysseus	Thoon	Antilochus
Pylaemenes	Menelaus	Amopaon	Teucer	Eubius	Neoptolemus	Morys	Neoptolemus	Thoon	Odysseus
Pylaeus	†	Amphiclus	Meges	Eumaeus	Diomedes	Morys	Meriones	Thrasius	Achilles
Pyraechmes	Patroclus	Amphimedon	Ajax the Lesser	Euphorbus	Menelaus	Mulius	Achilles	Thrasymelus	Patroclus
Rhesus	Odysseus and Diomedes	Amphinous	Neoptolemus	Eurycoon	Diomedes	Mulius	Patroclus	Thymbraeus	Diomedes or Apollo or Athena or Poseidon
Sarpedon	Patroclus	Amphinous	Diomedes	Eurydamas	Diomedes	Mydon	Achilles	Tlepolemus	Patroclus
		Amphius	Ajax the Greater	Eurymenes	Meges	Mydon	Antilochus	Troilus	Achilles
Amazons	Killers	Amphoterus	Patroclus	Eurynomus	Ajax the Greater	Mygdon	?	Tros	Achilles
Ainia	Diomedes	Antiphates	Leonteus	Eurytion	✓	Mynes	Achilles	Xanthus	Diomedes
Alcibie	†	Antiphus	Agamemnon	Evenor	Neoptolemus	Nessus	Ajax the Greater	Zechis	Teucer
Anchimache	†	Apisaon	Eurypylus	Evippus	Patroclus	Nirus	Neoptolemus	Zorus	Ajax the Greater
Andro	†	Archeptolemus	Teucer	Galenus	Neoptolemus	Noemon	Odysseus		
Androdaïxa	†	Archilochus	Menelaus	Gavius	Ajax the Lesser	Nychius	?		
Andromache	†	Areilycus	Patroclus	Glaucus	Odysseus	Ocythous	Ajax the Greater	Other Residents	Killers
Antandre	Achilles	Areithous	Achilles	Gorgythion	Teucer	Oenomaus	Idomeneus	Aesyetes	✓
Antianeira	†	Aretaon	Teucer	Halius	Odysseus	Oenops	Neoptolemus	Antenor	✓
Antibrote	Achilles	Aretus	Automedon	Harmon	Neoptolemus	Oileus	Agamemnon	Antimachus	?
Aspidocharme	†	Asteropaios	Achilles	Harpalion	Meriones	Ophelestes	Achilles	Antiphantes	Apollo or Athena or Poseidon
Bremusa	Idomeneus	Astyalus	Polypoetes	Helenus	✓	Opheltius	Euryalus	Beroe	✓
Chalcaor	†	Astynous	Diomedes	Helicaon	✓	Orestes	Leonteus	Briseus	?
Clete	✓	Astypylus	Achilles	Hellus	Eurypylus	Ormenus	Teucer	Chaon	✓
Clonie	Podarces	Atymnius	Antilochus	Hippocoon	?	Orsilochus	Teucer	Chloreus	✓
Cnemis	†	Autonous	Patroclus	Hippodamas	Achilles	Orthaeus	?	Chryses	✓
Derimacheia	Diomedes	Axion	Eurypylus	Hippodamus	Odysseus	Orythaon	Achilles	Dares	✓
Derinoe	Ajax the Lesser	Axylus	Diomedes	Hippolochus	Agamemnon	Othryoneus	Idomeneus	Diores	✓
Enchesimargos	†	Bienor	Agamemnon	Hipponous	Achilles	Palmys	?	Elymus	✓
Eurylophe	†	Cabeirus	Sthenelus	Hippotion	Meriones	Pammon	Neoptolemus	Eumedes	✓
Evandre	Meriones	Calesius	Diomedes	Hippomachus	Leonteus	Pandocus	Ajax the Greater	Eurydamas	?
Gortyessa	†	Caletor	Ajax the Greater	Hippomedon (2)	Neoptolemus	Panthous	†	Ilioneus	Diomedes
Harmothoe	Achilles	Cebriones	Patroclus	Hyllus	Ajax the Greater	Pasitheus	Neoptolemus	Laocoon	Apollo or Athena or Poseidon
Hecate	†	Cebrus	Neoptolemus	Hypanis	†	Pedaeus	Meges	Meges	?
Helene	Achilles	Celtus	Neoptolemus	Hypeirochus	Odysseus	Pedasus	Euryalus	Phorbas	?
Hippothoe	Achilles	Cestrus	Neoptolemus	Hypeiron	Diomedes	Peirasus	Philoctetes	Phrontis	?
Iodoce	†	Charops	Odysseus	Hyperenor	Menelaus	Peiros	Thoas	Pyrgo	✓
Ioxeia	†	Chersidamas	Odysseus	Hypsenor	Eurypylus	Pelagon	?	Tenes	Achilles
Oïstrophe	†	Chlemus	Meriones	Hyrtius	Ajax the Greater	Pelias	wounded by Odysseus	Theano	✓
Pharetre	†	Chromius	Diomedes	Hysminus	Neoptolemus	Perilaus	Neoptolemus	Tisiphone	?
Polemusa	Achilles	Cleobulus	Ajax the Lesser	Iamenus	Leonteus	Perimedes	Neoptolemus	Ucalegon	†
Thermodosa	Meriones	Clitus	Podalirius	Iapyx	✓	Perimus	Patroclus		
Thorece	†	Clydon	?	Idaeus	✓	Periphetes	Teucer	Royal Family	Killers
Toxoanassa	†	Coeranus	Odysseus	Ilioneus	Peneleus	Phaenops	?	Agathon	✓
Toxophone	†	Coon	Agamemnon	Imbrasius	Neoptolemus	Phaestus	Idomeneus	Anchises	✓
		Coroebus	Neoptolemus, Diomedes or Peneleus	Imbrius	Teucer	Phalces	Antilochus	Andromache	✓
		Corythus	† or Paris	Ipheus	Patroclus	Phalerus	Neoptolemus	Antiphonus	Neoptolemus
		Croesmus	Meges	Iphidamas	Agamemnon	Phasis	Neoptolemus	Aristomache	?
		Cycnus	Achilles	Iphition	Neoptolemus	Phegeus	Diomedes	Astyanax	Neoptolemus or Odysseus
		Daetes	?	Iphition	Achilles	Phereclus	Meriones	Astyoche	✓
		Daetor	Teucer	Isus	Agamemnon	Phleges	Neoptolemus	Cassandra	✓
		Damasus	Polypoetes	Itymoneus	Meges	Phylacus	Leitus	Clytius	?
		Dardanus	Achilles	Lamus	Thoas	Phylodamas	Meriones	Creusa	†
		Deicoon	Agamemnon	Laodamas	Neoptolemus	Pidytes	Odysseus	Hecuba	✓
		Deiochus	Ajax the Greater	Laodamas	Ajax the Greater	Pisander	Agamemnon	Hicetaon	?
		Deioneus	Philoctetes	Laodocus	?	Podes	Menelaus	Hippodamia	?
		Deiophontes	Teucer	Laogonus	Meriones	Polites	Neoptolemus	Lampus	?
		Deiopites	Meges	Laogonus	Achilles	Polybus	Neoptolemus	Laodice	✓ or †
		Deiphobus	Menelaus	Laomedon	Thrasymedes	Polydamas	?	Medesicaste	✓
		Deisenor	?	Laophoon	Meriones	Polydorus	Odysseus	Mestor	Achilles
		Democoon	Odysseus	Lassus	Podalirius	Polydorus	Achilles or Polymestor	Paris	Philoctetes
		Demoleon	Achilles	Leocritus	Odysseus	Polyidus	Diomedes	Polyxena	Neoptolemus
		Demuchus	Achilles	Lycaon	Achilles	Polymelus	Patroclus	Priam	Neoptolemus
		Deucalion	Achilles	Lycon	Meriones	Polymnius	Meges	Thymoetes	?
		Dolon	Odysseus and Diomedes	Lycophontes	Teucer	Polyphetes	?		
		Dolops	Menelaus	Lyncus	Thoas	Pronous	Patroclus		

== See also ==
- Catalogue of Ships
- Achaean Leaders
- Trojan Battle Order
- Trojan Horse
- List of Homeric characters
- List of children of Priam
