= Damase =

Damase is a personal name, the French-language counterpart of Damasus.

== Given name ==
- Damase Boulanger, founder of the city of Alma, Quebec
- Damase Dufresne, Canadian politician
- Damase Jalbert (1842–1904), founder of Val-Jalbert, Quebec
- Damase Parizeau (1841–1913), Quebec farmer, carpenter, lumber merchant and political figure
- Damase Pierre-Louis (1894–1945), Haitian historian, statesman, author, journalist and diplomat
- Damase Potvin, Quebec writer and journalist
- Joseph-Damase Bégin (1900–1977), Quebec political figure
- Damase Racine (1855–1921), Canadian merchant and political figure
- Raymond Damase Ngollo (1936–2017), Congolese army officer

== Surname ==
- Jean-Michel Damase (1928–2013), French classical composer

== See also ==
- Pope Damasus I (305–384)
- Pope Damasus II (died 1048)

== Places ==
- Saint-Damase, Quebec (disambiguation), several places
