= Amphoterus =

Amphoterus or Amphoteros may refer to:

- Amphoterus (son of Alcmaeon) by Callirrhoe (the daughter of the river god Achelous), and brother of Acarnan
- Amphoterus, a Trojan; see List of Trojan War characters
- Amphoterus (admiral) of Alexander the Great
