= Lists of Greek mythological figures =

This is an index of lists of mythological figures from ancient Greek religion and mythology.

- List of Greek deities
- List of mortals in Greek mythology
- List of Greek mythological creatures
- List of Trojan War characters
- List of Homeric characters
