= Damasus =

Damasus can refer to:

- Damasus (mythology), a soldier on the Trojan side in the Trojan War
- Damasus, king of Kourion on southern Cyprus in the 7th century BCE
- Damasus Scombrus, Greek orator from Tralles mentioned by Strabo
- Saint Pope Damasus I (305–384)
- Pope Damasus II (c. 1000–1048)
- Damasus (canonist) (12th–13th centuries); see Bartholomew of Brescia
- Damasus (beetle), a genus of leaf beetle in the subfamily Eumolpinae

== See also ==
- Damascus
