= Mentes (King of the Taphians) =

Greek mythological figure in the Odyssey

Athena, disguised as Mentes, washes her hands in the bowl and pitcher brought by Telemachus's maidservants - Odissea: dal Poema di Omero

In Greek mythology, Mentes (Ancient Greek: Μέντης Méntēs) is the name of the King of the Taphians and the son of Anchialus. He is mentioned in the Odyssey.

== Mythology ==
In Book I, the Goddess Athena disguises herself as Mentes, an old family friend of Odysseus, when she goes to visit his son, Telemachus. Athena, disguised as him, tells Telemachus that he is sailing to the city of Temese with his own crew, claiming that he is in search of bronze. Mentes (truly Athena) recommends that Telemachus should call a counsel to try to remove the suitors of Penelope. Then he should see King Nestor at Pylos and King Menelaus of Sparta, to make inquiries as to the whereabouts of his father. Upon his return, he should kill the suitors, either by stealth or publicly.

Although Mentes had hardly any appearances in Greek myths of earlier antiquity, he became a symbol of a guardian and a mentor. Later, his name got a derogatory flavor and became a symbol of a sinister messenger.

He is not to be confused with Mentor, the elderly friend of Odysseus in whose care Telemachus was placed during the Trojan War. To add to the possible confusion, Athena also takes the guise of Mentor (in Book II of The Odyssey). Nor is this Mentes the same character as the Mentes in the Iliad, who is king of the Cicones.

== Bibliography ==
- Homer, The Odyssey with an English Translation by A.T. Murray, Ph.D. in two volumes. Cambridge, MA., Harvard University Press; London, William Heinemann, Ltd. 1919. ISBN 978-0674995611. Online version at the Perseus Digital Library. Greek text available from the same website.
- Strabo, The Geography of Strabo. Edition by H.L. Jones. Cambridge, Mass.: Harvard University Press; London: William Heinemann, Ltd. 1924. Online version at the Perseus Digital Library.
- Strabo, Geographica edited by A. Meineke. Leipzig: Teubner. 1877. Greek text available at the Perseus Digital Library.
