= Bremon =

Mythological Greek warrior

In Greek mythology, Bremon (Ancient Greek: Βρέμοντα means "roar") was a Greek warrior who was killed in the Trojan War by the hero Aeneas, son of the goddess Aphrodite and Anchises of Dardanus.

== See also ==
- List of Trojan War characters
