= Menestheus (mythology) =

In Greek mythology, Menestheus (/mɪˈnɛsθiːəs/; Ancient Greek: Μενεσθεύς, lit. 'steadfast in strength' or 'one who remains strong/ vigorous') may refer to the following people:

- Menestheus, king of Athens who participated in the siege of Troy.
- Menestheus, an Athenian youth from Sounion who was sacrificed to the Minotaur. In another account, he was called Menesthes from Salamis and the grandson of Scirus who aided Theseus by providing a skilled pilot (Nausithous) and a look–out man (Phaeax) for the voyage.
- Menestheus, a warrior in the army of the Seven against Thebes, participant of the disk-throwing competition at the funeral games of Opheltes.
- Menestheus, son of Clytius and grandson of Aeolus, a companion of Aeneas.
- Menestheus, son of Iphicrates who named his son after the legendary King of Athens during the Trojan War.
