= Polyxena (mythology) =

Individuals in Greek mythology

In Greek mythology, Polyxena or Polyxene (/pəˈlɪksənə/; Ancient Greek: Πολυξένη, romanized: Poluxénē or Polyxénē, lit. 'entertaining many guests' or 'very hospitable') may refer to the following women:

- Polyxena, daughter of King Danaus of Libya (later Argos) as one of the 50 Danaids. She married her paternal cousin Aegyptus, namesake of his father, and eventually killed him on their wedding night following the instructions of her father Danaus.
- Polyxene, mother of Menestheus by Peteos. Otherwise, she was known as Mnesimache.
- Polyxena, daughter of King Priam of Troy and Hecabe. She was bethrothed to Eurymachus and beloved by Achilles.
