= Lernus =

In Greek mythology, Lernus (Ancient Greek: Λέρνου) may refer to the following individuals:

- Lernus, son of Proetus of Nauplia and father of Naubolus.
- Lernus, the Olenian father of Palaemon, one of the Argonauts. The latter was also called the son of Aetolus or Hephaestus
- Lernus, the Rhodian father by Amphiale of Cleodorus, one of the Achaean soldiers in the Trojan War. This son was slain with arrows by Paris, son of King Priam and Queen Hecuba of Troy.
- Lernus, a Greek warrior who was killed by the Amazon Queen Penthesilia.

== See also ==
- List of Trojan War characters
