= Proetus =

Several Greek mythological figures

In Greek mythology, Proetus (/ˈpriːtəs/; Ancient Greek: Προῖτος, romanized: Proitos) may refer to the following personages:

- Proetus, king of Argos and Tiryns, son of Abas and twin brother of Acrisius.
- Proetus, a prince of Corinth as the son of Prince Thersander, son of King Sisyphus. He was the father of Maera who died a maiden. Scholiasts on the Odyssey confound him with the Argive Proetus.
- Proetus of Thebes, eponym of the Proetid Gates, and father of Galanthis.
- Proetus of Nauplia, a son of Nauplius I and father of Lernus.
- Proetus, a son of Agenor (?). It is unclear whether Stephanus is referring to a son of Agenor named Proetus, or to the Argive Proetus as a descendant of Agenor.
