= Thootes =

Figure in Greek mythology

In Greek mythology from Homer's Iliad, Thootes or Thoötes /θoʊˈoʊtiːz/ (Ancient Greek:Θοώτης Thoōtēs in the form of Θοώτην or Θοῶτα in Iliad.) was the Achaean herald of the Athenian leader Menestheus, during the Trojan War. He is mentioned in Canto XII.

== Mythology ==
Thootes was sent by the Athenian leader Menestheus to Ajax for help.

Forthwith then to Aias he (i.e. Menestheus) sent the herald Thoötes: "Go, goodly Thoötes, run thou, and call Aias, or rather the twain, for that were far best of all, seeing that here will utter ruin soon be wrought. Hard upon us here press the leaders of the Lycians, who of old have ever been fierce in mighty conflicts. But if with them too yonder the toil of war and strife have arisen, yet at least let valiant Aias, son of Telamon, come alone, and let Teucer, that is well skilled with the bow, follow with him." So spake he, and the herald failed not to hearken as he heard, but set him to run beside the wall of the brazen-coated Achaeans, and he came and stood by the Aiantes, and straightway said: “Ye Aiantes twain, leaders of the brazen-coated Achaeans, the son of Peteos, nurtured of Zeus, biddeth you go thither, that, though it be but for a little space, ye may confront the toil of war—both of you, if so may be, for that were far best Of all, seeing that yonder will utter ruin soon be wrought. Hard upon them there press the leaders of the Lycians, who of old have ever been fierce in mighty conflicts. But if here too war and strife have arisen, yet at least let valiant Aias, son of Telamon, go alone, and let Teucer, that is well skilled with the bow, follow with him.” So spake he, and great Telamonian Aias failed not to hearken.

== Legacy ==
The Trojan asteroid 5041 Theotes is named after Thootes, with the 'e' due to a spelling error in a German translation of the Iliad.
