= Elasus =

Set index article on Greek mythology

In Greek mythology, Elasus or Elasos (Ancient Greek: Ἔλασος) may refer to two distinct characters:

- Elasus, a Trojan warrior who fought and died during the Trojan War. He was slain by the hero Patroclus during his rampage on the battlefield while wearing Achilles's armor.
- Elasus, a figure who appeared in a painting at Delphi. He was a soldier who sided with the Trojans during the siege of Troy and was killed by Neoptolemus, son of Achilles.
