= Diaphorus (mythology) =

Judge in Greek mythology

In Greek mythology, Diaphorus was a judge who sailed to Troy with the Achaeans.
