= Mecisteus (mythology) =

In Greek mythology, Mecisteus (/məˈsɪsˌt(j)uːs/; Ancient Greek: Μηκιστεύς Mēkisteús) may refer to the following personages:

- Mecisteus, an Arcadian prince as one of the 50 sons of the impious King Lycaon either by the naiad Cyllene, Nonacris or by unknown woman. He and his brothers were the most nefarious and carefree of all people. To test them, Zeus visited them in the form of a peasant. These brothers mixed the entrails of a child into the god's meal, whereupon the enraged Zeus threw the meal over the table. Mecisteus was killed, along with his brothers and their father, by a lightning bolt of the god.
- Mecisteus, one of the Seven Against Thebes who attacked the city. He was the son of Talaus and Lysimache.
- Mecisteus, an Achaean warrior who participated in the Trojan War. He was the son of Echius, another Greek soldier during the siege of Troy. Together with the Pylian Alastor, Mecisteus carried the wounded Teucer off the battle-field, as they later did with Hypsenor. Ultimately, Mecisteus was killed by the Trojan Polydamas.
- Mecisteus, one of the Suitors of Penelope who came from Dulichium along with other 56 wooers. He, with the other suitors, was killed by Odysseus with the help of Eumaeus, Philoetius, and Telemachus.
