= Mnesimache =

Mnesimache (Ancient Greek: Μνησιμάχη, lit. 'remembering the battle' or 'mindful of war') is a name that refers to the following figures in Greek mythology:

- Mnesimache, an Olenian princess as the daughter of King Dexamenus. Her possible siblings were Eurypylus, Theronice and Theraephone. She was also called Deianira or Hippolyte. Mnesimache was nearly abducted by the Centaur Eurytion. She must be the Mnesimache who became the mother of Diores by Amarynceus.
- Mnesimache, possible name for the mother of Menestheus by Peteos. Otherwise, she was known as Polyxene.
