= Cleodorus =

Soldier during the Trojan War

In Greek mythology, Cleodorus (Κλεόδωρος) was a Rhodian soldier during the Trojan War who was shot to death by Paris, son of King Priam and Queen Hecuba of Troy. Cleodorus himself was the son of Lernus and Amphiale.

== See also ==
- List of Trojan War characters
