= Menesthius =

Ancient Greek male name

In Greek mythology, the name Menesthius (Ancient Greek: Μενέσθιος, romanized: Menesthios, lit. 'strong in force', 'enduring might' or 'abiding strength') may refer to:

- Menesthius, son of Spercheus and Polydora, daughter of Perieres or of Peleus and Antigone. He was one of the Myrmidonian leaders in the Trojan War.
- Menesthius, son of Areithous and Phylomedusa, from Arnae, Boeotia, killed by Paris in the Trojan War.
