= Deicoon (mythology) =

Set index article on Greek mythology

In Greek mythology, Deicoon or Deikoon (Ancient Greek: Δηικόων, romanized: Dēikoōn or Dēïkoōn, lit. 'destroyer of people' or 'slayer of the host') may refer to distinct characters:

- Deicoon, one of the sons of Heracles and princess Megara of Thebes, and thus brother of Therimachus and Creontiades. He and his siblings were flung into the fire by their father when he had a fit of madness sent by the goddess Hera.
- Deicoon, son of Pergasus, and a close friend and companion of Aeneas. He was a hero honoured by the Trojans as if he had been a son of King Priam of Troy. During the Trojan War, Deicoon was slain by King Agamemnon of Mycenae who drove a spear straight through his shield and into his lower belly.
