= Meneclus =

In Greek mythology, Meneclus (Ancient Greek: Μένεκλος) was a member of the Ethiopian army who participated in the Trojan War.

== Mythology ==
Meneclus followed his leader, King Memnon, to fight on the side of the Trojans during the Trojan War. He was ultimately slain by the old Achaean hero, Nestor of Pylos.

“. . .To right, to left
His (i.e. Mennon) stalwart helpers wrought in battle-toil,
Alcyoneus and Nychius, and the son
Of Asius furious-souled; Meneclus' spear,
Clydon and Alexippus, yea, a host
Eager to chase the foe, men who in fight
Quit them like men, exulting in their king.”
Then, as Meneclus on the Danaans charged, king.
The son of Neleus slew him. Wroth for his friend,”
