= Alexippus (mythology) =

Character in Greek mythology

In Greek mythology, Alexippus (Ancient Greek: Ἀλέξιππος) was a member of the Ethiopian army who participated in the Trojan War.

== Mythology ==
Alexippus followed his leader, King Memnon, to fight on the side of the Trojans during the Trojan War.

“. . .To right, to left
His (i.e. Mennon) stalwart helpers wrought in battle-toil,
Alcyoneus and Nychius, and the son
Of Asius furious-souled; Meneclus' spear,
Clydon and Alexippus, yea, a host
Eager to chase the foe, men who in fight
Quit them like men, exulting in their king.”
