= Peteus =

Mythical Athenian prince

In Greek mythology, Peteus or Peteos (Ancient Greek: Πετεώς, romanized: Peteōs), also called Petes (Πέτης), was a member of the Athenian royal family as the son of Orneus, son of King Erechtheus. The Egyptians claimed that Peteus was originally an Egyptian, who later obtained Athenian citizenship.

== Family ==
By Polyxene or Mnesimache, Peteos became the father of Menestheus, successor of Theseus.

== Mythology ==
Peteus fled from Attica to Phocis after being pursued by King Aegeus. The majority of his companions came from deme of Stiria. Later on, to spite Theseus, the Dioscuri brought back his son Menestheus from exile, and made him regent of Athens.
