= Archeptolemus =

Son of Iphitus in Greek mythology

In Greek mythology, Archeptolemus or Archeptolemos (Ancient Greek: Ἀρχεπτόλεμος, romanized: Arkheptolemos, lit. 'leader in battle', 'master of war' or 'one who directs the combat') was a Trojan warrior and son of Iphitus.

== Mythology ==
During the siege of Troy, Archeptolemus became Hector's charioteer when Eniopeus was killed in battle. He was slain by the Achaean archer Teucer who shot an arrow aimed directly at Hector but Apollo swerved the dart, causing it to miss the hero and strike Archeptolemus instead, killing him instantly. Following the latter's death, Hector was forced to leave his body and hand the chariot reins over to his half-brother, Cebriones.
