= Areithous =

Ancient Greek male name

In Greek mythology, the name Areithous (Ancient Greek: Ἀρηΐθοος) may refer to:

- Areithous, King of Arne in Boeotia, and husband of Philomedusa, by whom he had a son Menesthius. He is called in the Iliad the "club-bearer" (korynetes), because he fought with no other weapon but an iron club. He fell by the hand of Lycurgus of Arcadia, who drove him into a narrow defile, where he could not make use of his club. His armor was later worn by Lycurgus and then by Ereuthalion. The tomb of Areithous was shown in Arcadia as late as the time of Pausanias.
- Areithous, a defender of Troy, squire and charioteer of the Thracian Rhigmus. Both Areithous and Rhigmus were killed by Achilles in the battle: he smote them with his spear.

The name is based on the adjective ἀρηΐθοος, meaning warlike, or literally "swift in the fight."
