= Bias (mythology) =

Several characters in Greek mythology

In Greek mythology, Bias (/ˈbaɪ.əs/; Ancient Greek: Βίας; Latin: Biantes) may refer to the following characters:

- Bias, a Megarian prince as a son of King Lelex and brother to Cleson and Pterelaus. He was killed by his nephew Pylas, also a Megarian king. After the murder, Pylas gave the kingdom to the deposed king of Athens, Pandion and later founded the city of Pylos in Peloponnesus.
- Bias, son of Amythaon and brother of Melampus.
- Bias, son of Melampus and Iphianira thus a nephew of the earlier Bias. But his name has been proposed to read "Abas", another son of Melampus.
- Bias, one of the Epigoni and son of Parthenopaeus, one of the Seven Against Thebes.
- Bias, a Trojan prince as one of the sons of King Priam of Troy by other women. Bias and his brothers, Dryops and Chorithan, were slain by Idomeneus.
- Bias, father of two Trojan warriors, Laogonus and Dardanus.
- Bias, an Athenian soldier who supported Menestheus against the attacks of Hector.
- Bias, a Pylian soldier who fought under their leader Nestor during the Trojan War.
- Bias, one of the Suitors of Penelope who came from Dulichium along with either 56 other wooers (according to Apollodorus), or 51 (according to Homer). He, with the other suitors, was slain by Odysseus with the aid of Eumaeus, Philoetius, and Telemachus.

== See also ==
- Naming citation for Jovian asteroid 38050 Bias
