= Axylus =

Trojan warrior in Greek mythology

In Greek mythology, Axylus (Ancient Greek: Ἄξυλος) was a Trojan warrior who participated in the Trojan War.

== Iliad ==
Axylus was a wealthy and young man, who was the son of Teuthras. He came from the town of Arisbe, a city in the Troad, and was killed by Diomedes during the siege of Troy:

Diomedes, expert in war cries, killed Axylus,
son of Teuthranus, a rich man, from well-built Arisbe.
People really loved him, for he lived beside a road,
welcomed all passers-by into his home.
But not one of those men he'd entertained now stood
in front of him, protecting him from wretched death.
Diomedes took the lives of two men--Axylus,
and his attendant Calesius, his charioteer.
So both men went down into the underworld.
