= Cleon (mythology) =

In Greek mythology, Cleon (/ˈkliːɒn, -ən/; Ancient Greek: Κλέων Kleon) was a fisherman from Syme, a small island between Caria and Rhodes. He came with their king Nireus to fight against Troy.

== Mythology ==
Cleon was slain by Polydamas, the Trojan friend of the hero Hector.

Polydamas struck down Eurymachus and Cleon with his spear. From Syme came with Nireus' following these: cunning were both in craft of fisher-folk to east the hook baited with guile, to drop into the sea the net, from the boat's prow with deftest hands swiftly and straight to plunge the three-forked spear. But not from bane their sea-craft saved them now.
