= Dryops (mythology) =

Greek mythological person

In Greek mythology, Dryops (/ˈdraɪ.ɒps/, Ancient Greek: Δρύοψ, "man of oak")

- Dryops, a king of Oeta.
- Dryops, a Trojan prince as one of the children of King Priam of Troy. In Homer's Iliad, he was killed by Achilles during the Trojan War. In another account, Dryops and his brothers, Bias and Chorithan, were instead slain by Idomeneus.
- Dryops, a companion of Aeneas killed by Clausus, an ally of Turnus, the man who opposed Aeneas in Italy.
