= Leonteus (mythology) =

List of mythological figures

In Greek mythology, the name Leonteus (Ancient Greek: Λεοντεύς) referred to the following individuals:

- Leonteus, also given in one source as father of Ixion.
- Leonteus, brother of Andraemon, who married Amphinome, daughter of Pelias.
- Leonteus, defender of Thebes in the war of the Seven. He was slain by Hippomedon.
- Leonteus, son of Coronus (the son of Caeneus) and Cleobule, was one of the commanders of the Lapiths during the Trojan War. Together with his associate, Polypoetes (son of Pirithous), he led the soldiers from the Thessalian cities of Argissa, Gyrtone, Orthe, Elone and Oloosson. He was credited with killing five people during the war: Antiphates, Hippomachus, Iamenus, Menon and Orestes.

== See also ==
- Jovian asteroid 3793 Leonteus
