= Anchises =

Mortal lover of the goddess Aphrodite

- King of Dardania
- Anchises and Ascanius fleeing from Troy. Apulian red-figure volute-krater, Ilioupersis Painter, 370-350 BC.
- Predecessor: Capys
- Abode: Dardania

Genealogy
- Parents: Capys and Themiste
- Consort: (1) Aphrodite (2) Eriopis (3) unknown
- Children: (1) Aeneas, Lyrus (2) Hippodamia (3) Agamede, Elymus

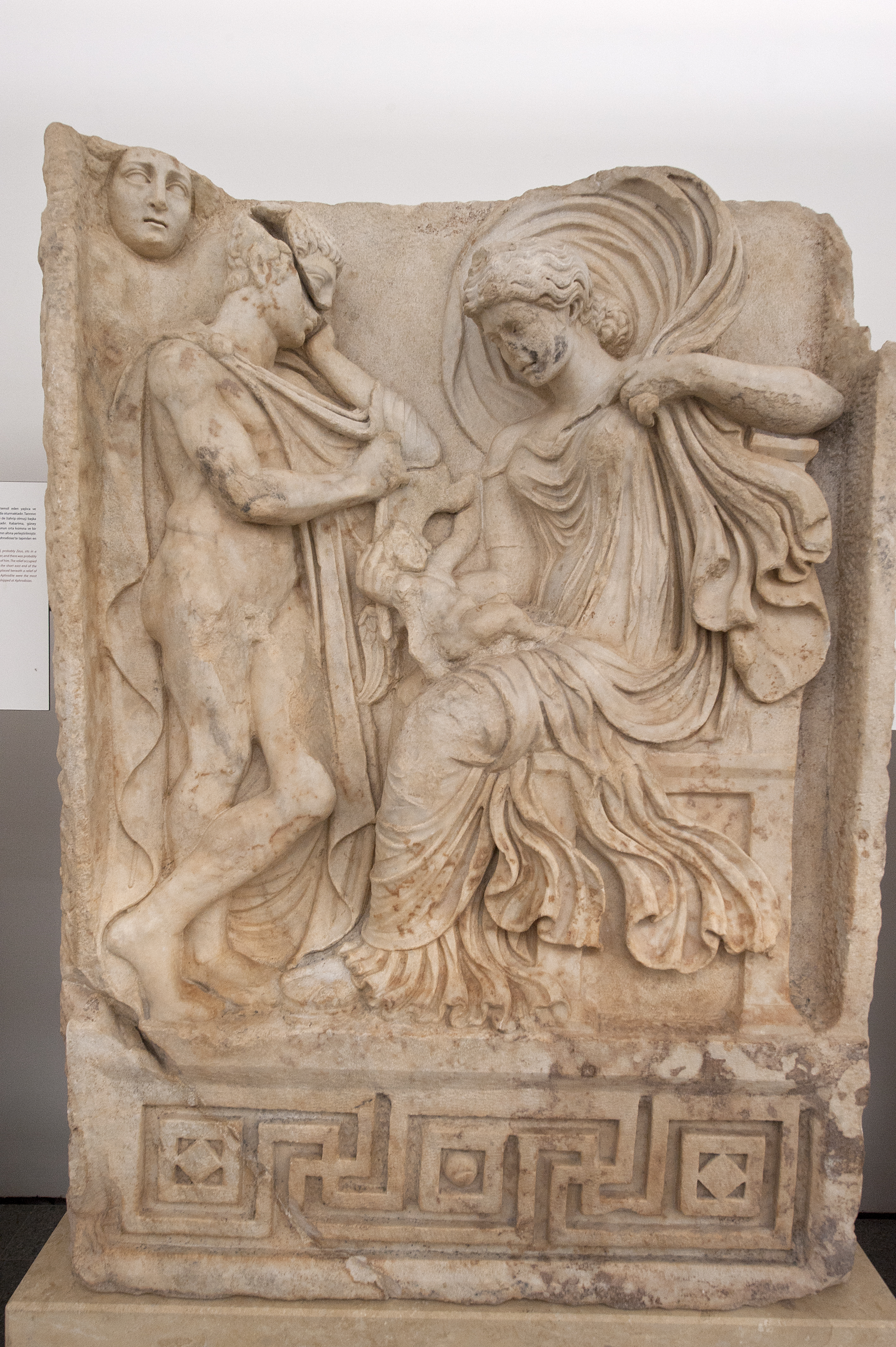
Aphrodite reveals baby Aeneas to Anchises (1st century AD).

In Greek and Roman mythology, Anchises (/ænˈkaɪsiːz/; Ancient Greek: Ἀγχίσης, romanized: Ankhísēs) was a member of the royal family of Troy, son of King Capys and lover of Aphrodite. He is most famous as the father of Aeneas and for his treatment in Virgil's Aeneid.

He was a mortal lover of the goddess Aphrodite (equivalent to the Roman goddess Venus). Zeus made her fall in love with Anchises while he was herding sheep at the foot of Mount Ida. One version is that Aphrodite pretended to be a Phrygian princess and seduced him, only to later reveal herself and inform him that they would have a son named Aeneas; Aphrodite had warned Anchises that if he told anyone about her being the mother of his child, Zeus would strike him down with his thunderbolt. He did not heed her warning and was struck with a thunderbolt, which in different versions either blinds him or kills him. The principal early narrative of Aphrodite's seduction of Anchises and the birth of Aeneas is the Homeric Hymn (5) to Aphrodite.

After the defeat of Troy in the Trojan War, the elderly Anchises was carried from the burning city by his son Aeneas, accompanied by Aeneas' wife Creusa, who died in the escape attempt, and small son Ascanius. The subject is depicted in several paintings, including a famous version by Federico Barocci in the Galleria Borghese in Rome. The rescue is also mentioned in a speech in Shakespeare's Julius Caesar when Cassius attempts to persuade Brutus to murder Caesar. Anchises himself died and was buried in Sicily many years later. Aeneas later visited Hades and saw his father again in the Elysian Fields.

Homer's Iliad mentions another Anchises, a wealthy native of Sicyon in Greece and father of Echepolus.

== Family ==
In the Iliad, Aeneas traces his lineage through Anchises to Zeus, the king of the gods. Anchises' father was King Capys of Dardania, the son of Assaracus. The Bibliotheca agrees, adding that his mother was Themiste, daughter of King Ilus of Troy. Hyginus, however, claims Assaracus was Anchises' father. He adds that Anchises' brother was Acoetes, father of the priest Laocoön.

According to the Bibliotheca, Anchises and Aphrodite had another son, Lyrus, who died childless. He later had a mortal wife named Eriopis, according to the scholiasts, and he is credited with other children beside Aeneas and Lyrus. Homer, in the Iliad, mentions a daughter named Hippodamia, their eldest ("the darling of her father and mother"), who married her cousin Alcathous. Another daughter, Agamede, is mentioned by the Byzantine writer John Tzetzes. Lycophron and Servius give Anchises an illegitimate son named Elymus.

== The Homeric Hymn to Aphrodite ==
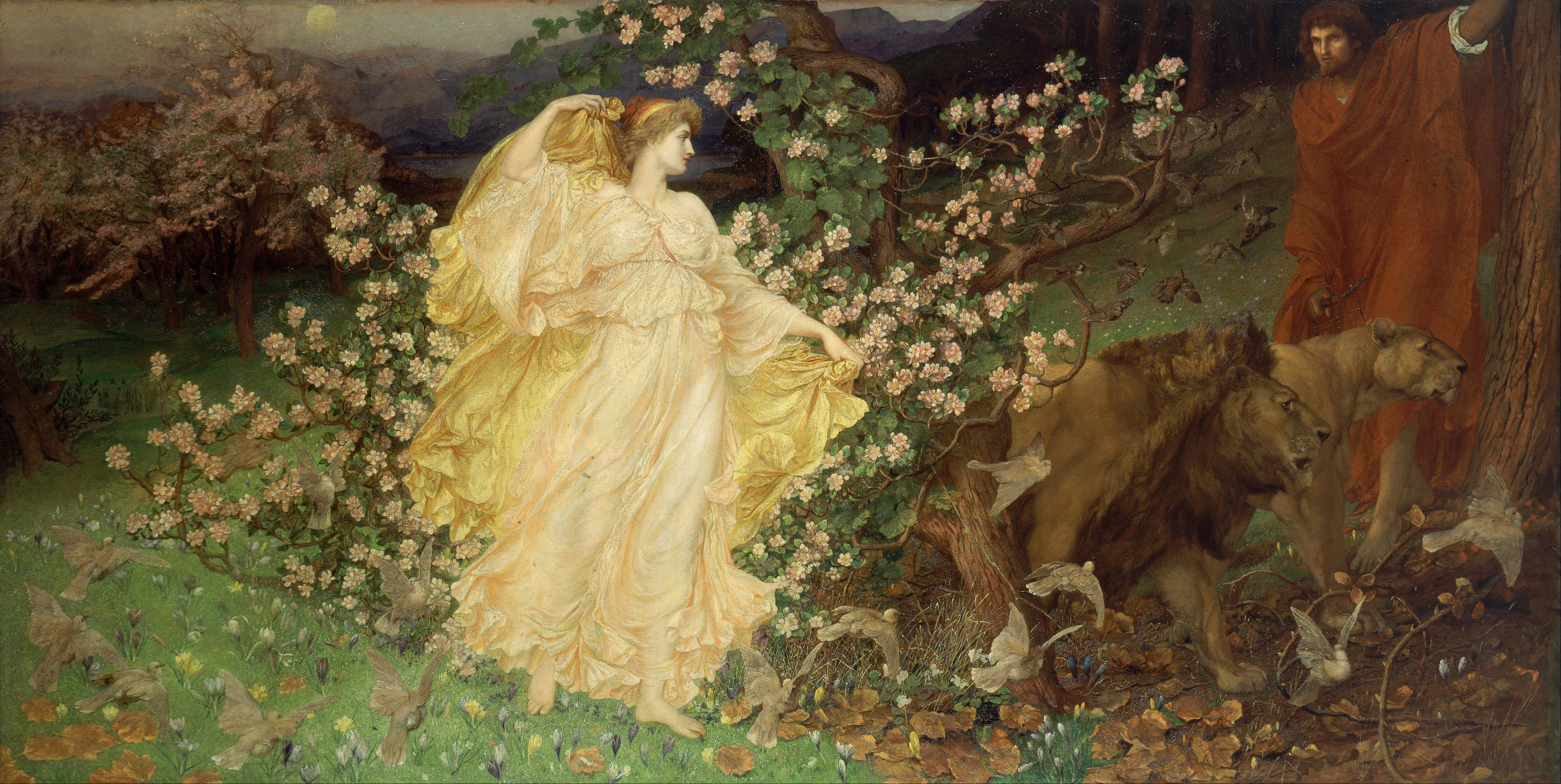
William Blake Richmond's Venus and Anchises (1889 or '90).

The Homeric Hymn to Aphrodite details how Aphrodite seduced Anchises. It begins by describing how only the three virgin goddesses (Athena, Artemis, and Hestia) are immune to Aphrodite's powers. She has made gods and goddesses fall in love with mortals. Not even Zeus was able to escape her powers and to put her in her place, he caused her to lust after the handsome mortal Anchises.

Aphrodite first happens upon Anchises on the hills of Mount Ida, where he is grazing his cattle. Anchises is described as having the beauty of an immortal. Aphrodite goes to Cyprus and bathes. Then she returns to the Troad disguised as a mortal, and finds Anchises alone in a hut. When Anchises first sees Aphrodite, he is convinced that she is a goddess, a grace, or a nymph. She convinces him that she is a Phrygian princess and that Hermes brought her there to marry Anchises. Anchises is overcome with desire for her and declares that he must have her immediately, and the two of them have sex.

After they have sex, Aphrodite puts Anchises into a deep sleep and dresses herself. When she is finished dressing, she wakes him up and reveals herself to him. When Anchises realizes her identity, he is terrified and full of regret and says that no good comes from having sex with a goddess. Aphrodite comforts him by telling him that she will bear him a son by the name of Aeneas, who will be respected among the Trojans and whose offspring will prosper. To further comfort Anchises, she goes on to tell him about two relationships: the relationship between Zeus and Ganymede, and the relationship between Eos and Tithonus. Both relationships are between an immortal and a mortal who survives the relationship. She then details how their son will be raised by nymphs until he is five years old, at which time she will bring Aeneas to him. Then she leaves, warning him not to reveal that she is the mother of his child or Zeus will smite him.

== Anchises in the Aeneid ==
The Aeneid by Virgil describes the journey of Aeneas after the fall of Troy. Anchises, the father of Aeneas, is a character in the epic. Even though Anchises is dead for most of the epic, he still makes multiple appearances in it, oftentimes to advise Aeneas.

=== Book 2 ===
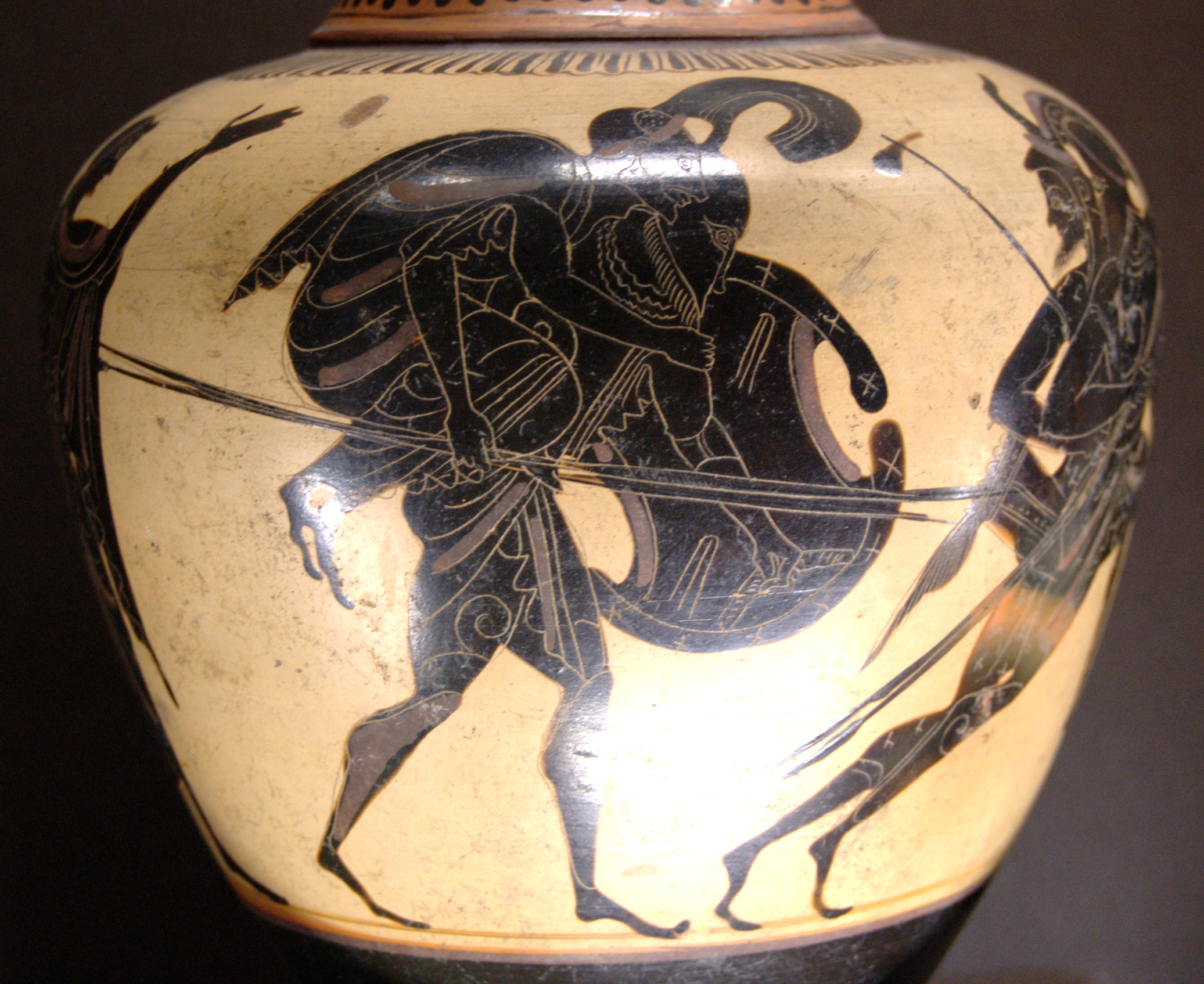
Aeneas carrying Anchises from Troy. 520-510 BC.

Anchises' first major appearance comes in Book 2. He is mentioned while Aeneas is telling Dido about the fall of Troy. During the fall of Troy, Aeneas makes his way home to save Anchises, his wife Creusa, and his son Ascanius. At first Anchises refuses to go with Aeneas and tells Aeneas to leave without him. Aeneas refuses to leave Anchises and declares that they will all die in Troy. Creusa argues with Aeneas over his decision and while they are arguing a painless flame appears on Ascanius' head. Anchises notices this and prays to Jupiter for a sign that they must leave. Just then they hear thunder and see a falling star. This convinces Anchises to go willingly with Aeneas. Aeneas carries Anchises on his back, Anchises carries their household gods, and Ascanius walks beside his father as they all flee Troy. Creusa was following behind them but is killed during the escape. As they leave Troy they meet up with other fleeing Trojans.

=== Book 3 ===
Anchises is mentioned in Book 3 while Aeneas continues his tale of how the Trojans came to be in Carthage. Anchises serves as a leader and advisor for the fleeing Trojans. After leaving Troy, the refugees make their way to Thrace and then to Delos. In Delos, Apollo tells them that they must make their new home in the original home of their ancestors. Anchises misinterprets this to mean Crete, so the Trojans head for Crete. There they establish a city, but they are soon overwhelmed by a plague. Anchises instructs Aeneas to seek out the Delian oracle. Before Aeneas does, he is visited in his dreams by their household gods who inform him that they are in the wrong place and must go to Italy. Aeneas tells Anchises of this dream. Anchises realizes that Apollo must have meant for them to establish a home in Italy, and so the Trojans head toward Italy. Italy is far away, and the Trojans must make many stops. Anchises dies in Sicily before the Trojans make it to Italy.

=== Book 5 ===
Anchises is mentioned in Book 5 after the Trojans leave Carthage. Storms force them to stop in Sicily, and Aeneas recalls that it has been a year since his father died, who had been buried with great honor. Aeneas declares for a festival to be held in honor of the deceased Anchises. Rituals are performed and sacrifices made at the tomb of Anchises. On the ninth day, Aeneas holds funeral games for his father that consist of a boat race, foot race, mock battle, boxing, and archery. After the funeral games, the Trojan women who have grown tired of traveling set fire to the ships. Even though most ships are saved by Jupiter, Aeneas loses heart and contemplates staying in Sicily. The ghost of Anchises appears, telling Aeneas that he was sent by the god Jupiter who saved the ships. He encourages Aeneas to continue his journey, informing him that he should leave the weary Trojans in Sicily and take the strongest with him to Italy. Anchises also instructs Aeneas to visit him in the underworld. Aeneas follows Anchises' advice and leaves Sicily, but before departing, he establishes that Anchises' tomb should be attended to by a priest and it should be designated a tract of woodland.

=== Book 6 ===
Anchises is mentioned in Book 6 when Aeneas voyages to the underworld. When Aeneas finds his father in the underworld, they have a tearful reunion. Aeneas tries to hug Anchises, yet he is unable. Aeneas then observes swarms of people gathered around a river. He asks his father about the river and those surrounding it. Anchises replies that the people are his future descendants and that the river is called Lethe. He expands that after suffering and being cleansed in the underworld, souls that are meant to be reincarnated go to the river Lethe to forget their memories so that they can be reincarnated. Anchises then shows Aeneas some of his descendants and discusses their deeds. He first mentions his son Silvius who will be born from Aeneas and Lavinia but after Aeneas is dead. Anchises then tells him of Romulus who is descended from Silvius, a member of the Caesarian line descended from Ascanius. He further describes that the Romans will prosper. Aeneas sees Marcellus and asks Anchises about his identity. Anchises states that he is Marcellus, who will hold great promise for the Romans but die too young and thus cause them great grief. Finally, Anchises leads Aeneas through the gates of horn and ivory and out of the underworld. This is the last major appearance of Anchises.

== Anchises in Metamorphoses ==
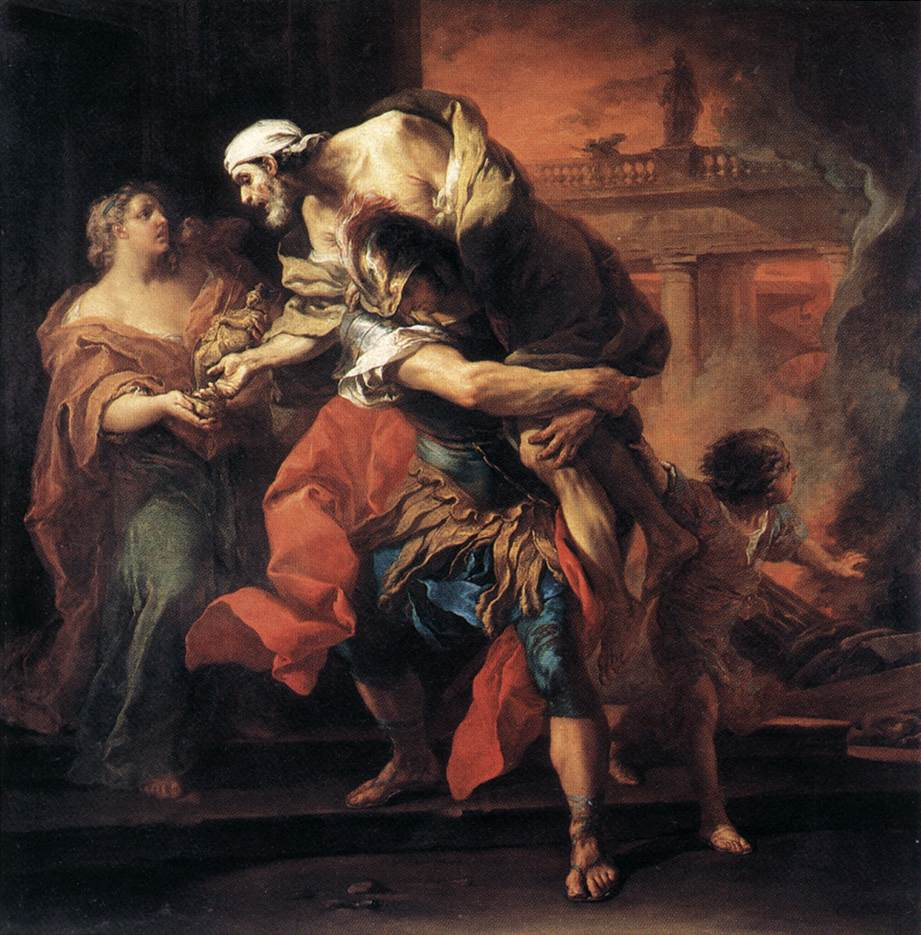
Aeneas Bearing Anchises from Troy, by Carle van Loo, 1729 (Louvre)

Anchises makes a few brief appearances in Ovid's Metamorphoses. He is first mentioned in Book 9. After youth was restored to Iolaus by Hebe, other gods and goddesses ask that it also be restored to their loved ones. (9.418-450) Venus asks that youth be restored to Anchises. (9.424-425)

Anchises is mentioned again in Book 13 in the story of the daughters of Anius. The story begins by briefly describing that Aeneas, Anchises, Ascanius, and other Trojan refugees fled Troy, traveled to Antandros, then to Thrace, and finally arrived in Delos. (13.623–631) Once in Delos, Anchises asks Anius, the king and a priest of Apollo, about his children. (13.639–642) Anius describes that his daughters received the ability to transform that which they touched into grain, wine, and olive oil, but this gift only caused them misery as the Greeks kidnapped them so as to take advantage of their powers. (13.651–659) His daughters asked to be freed, and thus they were turned into white doves. (13.667–674)

Anchises is briefly mentioned a couple of times in Book 14. First, in 14.82-84: "And fleeing that new city in the sands, Aeneas once again returned to Eryx, the royal residence of his true friend Acestes; here, at Anchises' tomb he honored his father with gift offerings." This makes reference to the funeral games Aeneas held for his deceased father Anchises in Book 5 of the Aeneid. And in 14.116-118: "Aeneas did as he was told and saw the underworld's formidable resources and his ancestral spirits and the shade of that great-spirited and venerable man, [his] father Anchises." This makes reference to the Aeneas' journey into the underworld, where he meets with the specter of his late father Anchises, in Book 6 of the Aeneid.

== Family tree ==
Trojan race

Oceanus	Tethys
Atlas	Pleione	Scamander	Idaea	Simoeis
Zeus/Jupiter	Electra	Teucer
Dardanus	Batea
Ilus	Erichthonius	Astyoche
Callirrhoe	Tros
Ilus	Ganymede	Assaracus	Hieromneme
Laomedon	Themiste	Capys
Priam	Anchises	Aphrodite/Venus	Latinus
Creusa	Aeneas	Lavinia
Ascanius	Silvius
Aeneas Silvius
Latinus Silvius
Alba
Atys
Capys
Capetus
Tiberinus Silvius
Agrippa
Romulus Silvius
Aventinus
Procas
Numitor	Amulius
Ares/Mars	Rhea Silvia/Ilia
Hersilia	Romulus	Remus

== See also ==
- The Golden Bough (mythology)
- Mount Ida
