= Toxaechmes =

In Greek mythology, Toxaechmes (Ancient Greek: Τοξαίχμην) was the "stalwart" Achaean warrior who participated in the Trojan War.

== Mythology ==
Toxaechmes was a comrade of Philoctetes who was killed by the Trojan hero Aeneas during the siege of Troy.

Wroth for his friend, a stone Aeneas hurled, and Philoctetes' stalwart comrade slew, Toxaechmes; for he shattered his head and crushed helmet and skull-bones; and his noble heart was stilled.
