= Antitheus =

Sport

In Greek mythology, Antitheus (Ancient Greek: Ἀντίθεον means "equal to the gods, godlike") was one of the Achaean soldiers who was killed by the Amazon queen, Penthesilea.
