= Prytanis (mythology) =

Lycian fighter in the Iliad

In Greek mythology, Prytanis (Ancient Greek: Πρύτανίν means 'ruler, lord') was a Lycian soldier who followed their leader, Sarpedon, to fight in the Trojan War. He was slain by the Greek hero Odysseus during the siege of Troy.
