= Alcibie =

In Greek Mythology Alcibie (Ancient Greek: Αλκίβια or Αλκιβίη, romanized: Alkibíē or Alkibía, lit. 'mighty in strength' or 'forceful prowess') was one of the Amazons, a race of warrior-women. She fought with their queen, Penthesilea to the Trojan War.

== Mythology ==
During the siege of Troy, Alcibie was killed in battle by the Argive hero Diomedes, son of Tydeus.

". . .and on Alcibie Tydeus' terrible son swooped, and on Derimacheia: head with neck clean from the shoulders of these twain he shore w ith ruin-wreaking brand. Together down fell they, as young calves by the massy axe of brawny flesher felled, that, shearing through the sinews of the neck, lops life away. So, by the hands of Tydeus' son laid low upon the Trojan plain, far, far away from their own highland-home, they fell."
