= Damase Pierre-Louis =

Haitian historian

Damase Pierre-Louis (1894–1945) was a Haitian historian, statesman, author, journalist and diplomat.

Pierre-Louis was born in Borgne, northern Haiti. He worked as a teacher of English at Collège Notre-Dame du Perpetuel Secours in Cap-Haitian, Haiti. He earned a law degree and was a lawyer as well. He also was a journalist and a diplomat, serving as the ambassador to France. He is best known for his political writing. He was candidate to senate for the department of North, Haiti in 1933. He died in prison in 1945.

== Selected works ==
- Le President Borno et la Liberation du territoire (1924)
- Les mensonges de notre democratie (1933)
- Pouvoir et Politique (1934)
