= Derimacheia =

One of the Amazons

In Greek mythology, Derimacheia (Ancient Greek: Δηριμάχεια, lit. 'she who fights in battle' or 'battle-fighter') was one of the Amazons, a race of warrior-women. She came with their queen, Penthesilia to the Trojan War.

== Mythology ==
During the siege of Troy, Derimacheia was killed in battle by the Argive hero Diomedes, son of Tydeus.

". . .and on Alcibie Tydeus' terrible son swooped, and on Derimacheia: head with neck clean from the shoulders of these twain he shore with ruin-wreaking brand. Together down fell they, as young calves by the massy axe of brawny flesher felled, that, shearing through the sinews of the neck, lops life away. So, by the hands of Tydeus' son laid low upon the Trojan plain, far, far away from their own highland-home, they fell."
