= Molus (Argive soldier) =

In Greek mythology, the name Molus (/ˈmoʊləs/; Ancient Greek: Μῶλος or Μόλος, romanized: Mōlos or Mólos, lit. 'toil and moil', 'struggle', or 'fight') was a warrior from Argos who came with king Sthenelus to join the Trojan War. He was killed by Agenor, son of the Trojan elder, Antenor

== Mythology ==
=== Quintus Smyrnaeus' Account ===
Agenor smote Molus the princely, — with king Sthenelus he came from Argos, — hurled from far behind a dart new-whetted, as he fled from fight, piercing his right leg, and the eager shaft cut sheer through the broad sinew, shattering the bones with anguished pain: and so his doom met him, to die a death of agony.
