= Echepolus =

Set index article on Greek mythology

In Greek mythology, Echepolus (Ancient Greek: Ἐχέπωλος, romanized: Echepōlos or Ekhepōlos, lit. 'he who holds foals' or 'keeper of young horses') may refer to two distinct characters:

- Echepolus, son of Thalysius and a Trojan warrior who fought in the front ranks during the Trojan War. He was the very first warrior slain by Nestor's son Antilochus, who drove a bronze spear into his brow.
- Echepolus, son of Anchises and a wealthy man from Sicyon who did not want to join Agamemnon's army for the Trojan War. To buy his way out of service, he presented Agamemnon a prized, fleet-footed mare named Aethe.
