= Trechus (mythology) =

In Greek mythology, Trechus (Ancient Greek: Τρῆχόν) was a Aetolian spearman who participated in the Trojan War. During the siege of Troy, he was slain by the Trojan hero Hector and the war-god Ares.
