= Aenius =

Mythologic Paeonian soldier

In Greek mythology, Aenius (Ancient Greek: Αἴνιον, romanized: Aīnion or Aínion, lit. 'praiseworthy' or 'praise') was a Paeonian soldier who participated in the siege of Troy. He sided with the Trojans during the Trojan War and was killed by the hero Achilles.
