= Bathycles (mythology) =

In Greek mythology, Bathycles (Ancient Greek: Βαθυκλῆς) was a Thessalian Myrmidon warrior, who took part in the Trojan War on the side of the Achaeans.

== Family ==
His father was called Chalcon (Χάλκων).

== Mythology ==
Bathycles was killed in the Trojan War by Glaucus and is mentioned in Homer's Iliad (rhapsody 16):

So far the Trojans from their lines retired;
Till Glaucus, turning, all the rest inspired.
Then Bathycleiis fell beneath his rage,
The only hope of Ghalcon's trembling age:
Wide o'er the land was stretched his large domain,
With stately seats and riches blessed in vain.
Him, bold with youth, and eager to pursue
The flying Lycians, Glaucus met, and slew;
Pierced through the bosom with a sudden wound,
He fell, and, falling, made the fields resound.
The Achaians sorrow for their hero slain;
With conquering shouts the Trojans shake the plain,
And crowd to spoil the dead: the Greeks oppose:
An iron circle round the carcass grows.
—Iliad by Homer, translated by Alexander Pope, rhapsody 16
