= Damasus (mythology) =

In Greek mythology, Damasus (Ancient Greek: Δάμασος, romanized: Damasos, lit. 'tamer' or 'one who subdues/ conquers') may refer to the following figures:

- Damasus, a soldier in the army of the Seven Against Thebes. While trying to escape, he was slain at Thebes by Haemon who impaled him from behind by a spear that ripped away his shield as it passed straight through his chest.
- Damasus, a warrior who fought on the Trojan side during the Trojan War. He was killed by Polypoetes, the leader of the Gyrtonians, who speared him straight through his bronze helmet.
- Damasus, son of King Codrus of Athens and leader of an Attic contingent that sailed to settle Caria in southwestern Asia Minor.
