= Anchialos (mythology) =

Greek mythological characters

In Greek mythology, the name Anchialus (Ancient Greek: Ἀγχίαλος, romanized: Ankhialos) may refer to the following characters:

- Anchialus, a 'well-skilled' Greek warrior who participated in the Trojan War. He and Menesthes, while riding a chariot, were killed by the Trojan hero Hector.
- Anchialus of Taphos, father of Mentes.
- Anchialus, a Phaeacian who participated in the games in honor of Odysseus.
  - He was also in Christopher Nolan's "The Odyssey" portrayed by Korean-American actor Will Yun Lee, only to die in the siren's island after removing his wax from his ears.
