= Persinous =

In Greek mythology, Persinous (Ancient Greek: Περσίνοόν) was an Achaean warrior who participated in the Trojan War. He was slain by the Amazon queen, Penthesilia.
