= Ucalegon =

Trojan noble in the Iliad

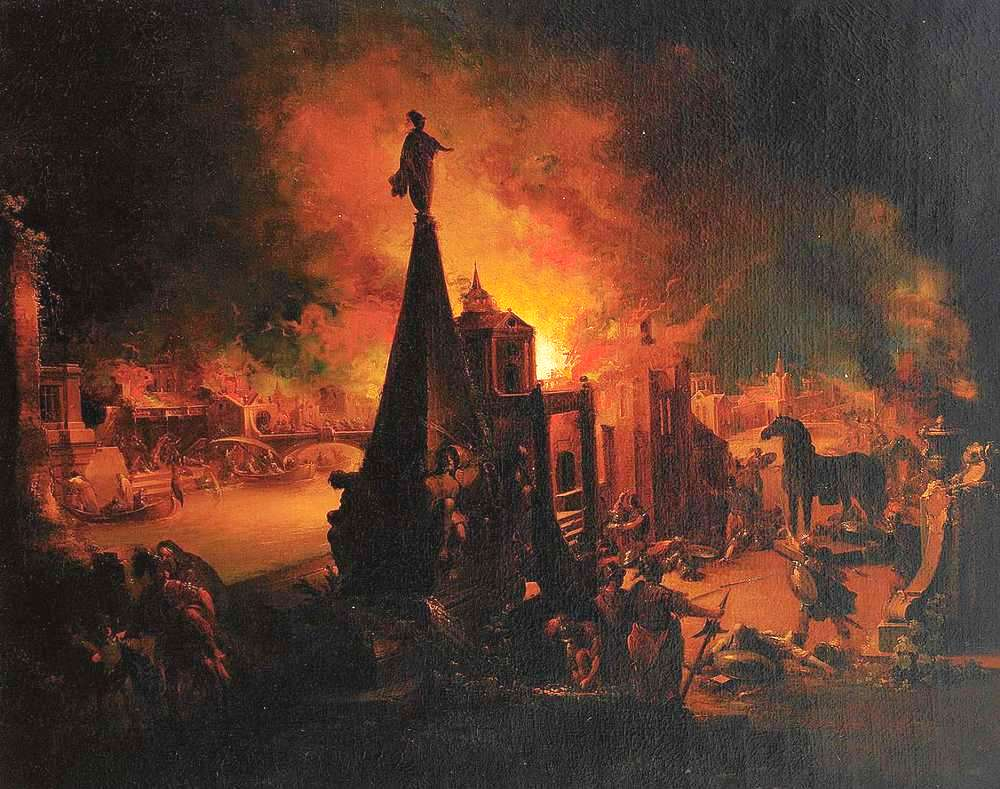
An 18th-century depiction of the sacking of Troy

Ucalegon (Ancient Greek: Οὐκαλέγων, romanized: Oukalégōn) was one of the Elders of Troy, whose house was set afire by the Achaeans when they sacked the city. He is one of Priam's friends in the Iliad, and the destruction of his house is referred to in the Aeneid.

He is referenced in the Satires of Juvenal. His name in Greek is translated as "doesn't worry." The name has become an eponym for "neighbor whose house is on fire," and Will Shortz, editor of The New York Times crossword puzzle, has stated that it is his favorite word in the English language.

== Usage in literature ==
- François Rabelais; Peter Anthony Motteux (1694). "XXII". Gargantua and Pantagruel. Vol. IV. "But who is this Ucalegon below, that cries and makes such a sad moan?"
- Eneas Sweetland Dallas (1866). "Sans Merci: Or, Kestrels and Falcons". Once A Week. p. 244. "If Seyton's own roof-tree was still unsinged, the fire had made wild work, of late, with his neighbours' dwellings; and, from the disaster of the last of these unlucky Ucalegons, he was divided by a thin party-wall."
- Thomas Frederick Kirby (1892). "Chapter 1". Annals of Winchester College. p. 333. "One of them, Peter Chamberlin, was burnt out; but this Ucalegon lived next door to the Castle, and suffered in consequence."
- Edwin Arlington Robinson (1897). "The Point of View". Scribner's Magazine. Vol. 66. p. 764. "Ucalegon he lost his house, when Agamemnon came to Troy; but who can tell me who he was, I'll pray the gods to give him joy."
- Elizabeth Hand (1992). "Chapter 2". Aestival Tide. "The moujiks had names for these hurricanes. They believed that there were really only two of them, Baratdaja the Healing Wind and Ucalegon the Prince of Storms, and that they returned decade after decade to batter the domes like the hands of some monstrous lunatic."
- Iain M Banks (2010). "Chapter 19". Surface Detail. "The Jhlupian heavy cruiser Ucalegon – forty times as fast as any ship possessed by the Sichultian Enablement..."
- Julien Gracq (1951). "Chapter 12". The Opposing Shore, p. 255. "'We have not been timely in understanding,' he continued with a sarcastic glance, 'the lesson of iam proximus ardet Ucalegon.'"

== Namesake ==
- 55701 Ukalegon
