= Laogonus =

In Greek mythology, Laogonus (Ancient Greek: Δαογόνον or Λαόγονον) may refer to the following personages:

- Laogonus, an Achaean warrior who participated in the Trojan War. He was slain by the Amazon Derinoe.
- Laogonus, the "bold" son of the Trojan priest Onetor and a soldier who fought during the siege of Troy. He was killed by Meriones, a Cretan leader, who smote him beneath his jaw under the ear.
- Laogonus, another Trojan warrior who defended the city of Ilium. He was the son of Bias, son King Priam, and brother of Dardanus. Laogonus and his brother were slayed by the hero Achilles during the battle. The latter thrust them both from their chariot to the ground, smiting the one with a cast of his spear and the other with his sword in close fight.
