= Amphinous =

Ancient Greek male name

In Greek mythology, Amphinous (Ancient Greek: Ἀμφίνοος or Ἀμφινόος, romanized: Amphinoos, lit. 'grazing all around' or 'mindful/ attentive on all sides') may refer to two distinct characters connected with the Trojan war:

- Amphinous, one of the 12 Trojan warriors slain by Neoptolemus using his father's (i.e. Achilles) spear.
- Amphinous, another Trojan soldier killed by Diomedes during the fall of Troy.
