= Demoleus =

Achaean warrior in Greek mythology

In Greek mythology, Demoleus or Demoleos was an Achaean warrior who participated in the Trojan War.

== Mythology ==
During the siege of Troy, Demoleus was slain by the hero Aeneas.

Aeneas gave a smooth-linked golden corselet, triple-chained, of which his own victorious hand despoiled Demoleos, by the swift, embattled stream of Simois, under Troy,—and bade it be a glory and defence on valor's field; scarce might the straining shoulders of two slaves, Phegeus and Sagaris, the load endure, yet oft Demoleos in this armor dressed charged down full speed on routed hosts of Troy.
