= Dardanus (mythology) =

Disambiguation page

In Greek mythology, Dardanus (/ˈdɑːrdənəs/; Greek: Δάρδανος, Dardanos) is the name attributed to several distinct individuals:

- Dardanus, son of Zeus and Electra, and founder of the city of Dardanus, of the tribe of Dardans.
- Dardanus, a Scythian king, and the father of Idaea, the wife of King Phineus.
- Dardanus, a Trojan warrior who defended the city of Ilium during the city's 10-year siege. He was the son of Bias, son of King Priam, and brother of Laogonus. Dardanus and his brother were slain by the hero Achilles during the battle. The latter thrust them both from their chariot to the ground, smiting the one with a cast of his spear and the other with his sword in close fight.
- Dardanus, a son of Illyrius.
