= Saint-Damase, Quebec =

Saint-Damase, Quebec may refer to:

- Saint-Damase, Bas-Saint-Laurent, Quebec, in La Matapédia Regional County Municipality
- Saint-Damase, Montérégie, Quebec, in Les Maskoutains Regional County Municipality
- Saint-Damase-de-L'Islet, in L'Islet Regional County Municipality
