= Menesthes =

Greek mythological character

In Greek mythology, Menesthes (Ancient Greek: Μενέσθην, lit. 'abiding strength' or 'enduring might') may refer to two distinct characters:

- Menesthes, also called Menestheus, a Salaminian youth who was chosen by lot to be sent to Crete as a sacrificial tribute to the Minotaur. He was a grand-child of Scirus of Salamis through his daughter, which prompted Scirus to aid Theseus by providing a skilled pilot (Nausithous) and a look–out man (Phaeax) for the voyage.
- Menesthes, a 'well-skilled' Achaean warrior who participated in the Trojan War. He and Anchialus, both riding a chariot, were killed by the Trojan hero Hector.
