= Echemmon (mythology) =

Greek mythological figure

In Greek mythology, Echemmon (/ɪˈkɛmən/ ih-KEM-ən; Ancient Greek: Ἐχέμμων or Ἐχέμμον) may refer to the following characters:

- Echemmon, a Trojan hero and son of King Priam of Troy. He was killed together with his brother Chromius by Diomedes, king of Argos, during the Trojan War. In another account, Echemmon and his brother Aretus, were instead slain by Odysseus.
- Echemmon, a friend of Thoas who was killed by Eurypylus of Mysia during the siege of Troy.
