= Iliona =

Belgian musical artist

- Iliona performing at the 2026 Montreux Jazz Festival

Background information
- Born: Iliona Roulin; July 7, 2000 (age 26); Brussels metropolitan area, Belgium
- Genres: Chanson française; pop
- Occupations: singer-songwriter; musician; music producer
- Years active: 2016–present
- Labels: Jevousamour; Naïve Records
- Website: www.iliona.be

Iliona Roulin (born July 7, 2000), is a Belgian singer-songwriter, musician and producer.

She gained public recognition with her song "Moins Joli" in 2020.

In September 2020, she signed with Artside Music label (known for artists like MHD and Zed Yun Pavarotti) and released her first EP Tristesse on February 5, 2021, featuring eight tracks. Her second EP Tête brulée was released on January 14, 2022, containing nine tracks.

Her first studio album What If I Break Up With U? was released on March 14, 2025, preceded by singles "Le Lapin," "Stp," "Rater une rupture pour les nuls," "Lâche-moi la main," and "Ça n'existe pas" from 2024.

== Early life ==
Iliona was born in Brussels, Belgium on July 7, 2000, to a psychologist mother and architect father.

She grew up and studied in the Brussels region at École Decroly, the same school attended by singer Angèle. From an early age, she developed an interest in music and began playing the family piano, inspired by her childhood friends who played. Around age 15, she started writing her first texts, which were not initially songs but rather served as an emotional outlet for expressing her feelings.

At 16, she created her YouTube channel and began posting videos of her compositions, handling everything independently in her bedroom from writing and music production to video editing.

== Discography ==
Studio albums

- Tristesse (2021)
- Tête Brûlée (2022)
- What If I Break Up With U? (2025)

== See also ==
- "belle pour Iliona" an acoustic guitar song by Michael Nothing.
