= Amphoterus (mythology) =

Ancient Greek male given name

In Greek mythology, Amphoterus (Ancient Greek: Ἀμφότερος, romanized: Amphoteros, lit. 'each of two' or 'both')

- Amphoterus, son of Alcmaeon by the naiad Callirrhoe, and brother of Acarnan.
- Amphoterus, a Lycian warrior who defended Troy during the Trojan War. He was among several Trojan warriors slain by the Achaean hero Patroclus during his rampage on the battlefield.
