= Menippus (mythology) =

Achaean warrior in Greek mythology

In Greek mythology, Menippus (Ancient Greek: Μένιππον) was an Achaean warrior who participated in the Trojan War. He sailed from Phylace and followed Protesilaus to the war at Troy. Menippus met his demise at the hands of the Amazon Clonie.
