= Aethicus (mythology) =

In Greek mythology, Aethicus (Ancient Greek: Αἴθικον, romanized: Aithikon, lit. 'pertaining to the Aithikes') was a Paphlagonian champion who fought against the Achaeans in the Trojan War.

== Mythology ==
Aethicus only appeared in one myth as one of the chosen heroes of Priam to fight the Greeks during the siege of Troy.

“Gallantly spake he (i.e. Priam): with exceeding joy
Rejoiced the Trojans. Champions then he chose,
Alexander and Aeneas fiery-souled,
Polydamas, Pammon, and Deiphobus,
And Aethicus, of Paphlagonian men
The staunchest man to stem the tide of war;
These chose he, cunning all in battle-toil,
To meet the foe in forefront of the fight.”

During the battle, Agamemnon attempted to pursue him, but Aethicus retreated amongst his comrades.
