= Menon (mythology) =

Soldier in Greek mythology

In Greek mythology, Menon (Ancient Greek: Mένων) was a Trojan soldier killed by Leonteus in the Trojan War as detailed by Homer in the Iliad (XII.201).
