= Ereuthus =

In Greek mythology, Ereuthus (Ancient Greek: Ἔρευθον) was an Elean warrior who participated in the Trojan War.

== Mythology ==
Ereuthus was a man from Thryon, a town near the Alpheus river, and a follower of King Nestor of Pylos to Troy. Ultimately, Ereuthus was killed by the Ethiopian Memnon, son of Eos (Dawn).

“But on the other side the hero child [i.e. Memnon] of the Dawn-goddess slew the Argive men, like to a baleful Doom which bringeth down on men a grim and ghastly pestilence. First slew he Pheron; for the bitter spear plunged through his breast, and down on him he hurled goodly Ereuthus, battle-revellers both, dwellers in Thryus by Alpheus' streams, which followed Nestor to the god-built burg of Ilium.”
