= Clonia (mythology) =

Nymph in ancient Greek mythology

In Greek mythology, Clonia or Clonie (Ancient Greek: Κλονιη or Κλονίη, romanized: Kloniê or Klonie, lit. 'wildly-rushing' or 'tumultuous') may refer to two distinct characters:

- Clonia, a nymph in Greek mythology. She is the consort of Hyrieus, by whom she became the mother of Nycteus and Lycus.
- Clonie, the 'fair as a goddess' Amazon, who came with their Queen Penthesilia to the Trojan War. During the siege of Troy, she killed the Achaean warrior Menippus and in turn died at the hands of the latter's comrade, Podarces who threw a lance that caught Clonie between the hips, tearing through her abdomen spilling her bowels out onto the battlefield.
