= Echius =

In Greek mythology, Echius (Ancient Greek: Ἐχίοιο or Ἐχίον) may refer to two different men who both participated in the Trojan War:

- Echius, an Achaean warrior who was slain by the Trojan prince Polites, son of King Priam. He was the father of Mecisteus, another Greek soldier during the siege of Troy.
- Echius, a Lycian warrior who followed their commander, Sarpedon, in the defense of Ilium. He was killed by Patroclus.
