= Autonous (mythology) =

In Greek mythology, Autonous (Ancient Greek: Αὐτόνοος (Auto - Nuss) means 'man with a mind of his own') may refer to two separate individuals:

- Autonous, son of Melaneus and husband of Hippodamia.
- Autonous, an Achaean warrior who participated in the Trojan War. He was slain by Hector just before the Trojans attack the Greek ship's camp in the tenth year of the battle.
