= Hippotion (mythology) =

Two mythical figures

In Greek mythology, Hippotion (Ancient Greek: Ἱπποτίων) may refer to the following individuals:

- Hippotion, one of the Centaurs who lived on the Pholoe mountain in Arcadia. Once he smelled the sweet odor of the wine coming from the cave of Pholus, he went there with many other Centaurs, armed with stones and pine trees. As soon as they stormed into the cave, however, they were met by the furious Heracles, who was visiting Pholus at that time. The hero engaged into battle with the Centaurs and driven away a large number of them with burning torches. The other Centaurs who cannot escape, including Hippotion, were all killed by Heracles.
- Hippotion, a resident of Ascania in Phrygia and father of the Trojan warrior Morys. When they attacked the Greek fleet, he and his son were both killed by Meriones, one of the leaders of the Cretan troops, during the tenth year of the Trojan War.
