= Calesius =

Character in the Iliad

In Greek mythology, Calesius (Ancient Greek: Καλήσιος) was the attendant and charioteer of Axylus. He is mentioned in Book VI of Homer's Iliad where he is killed with his master by Diomedes.

== See also ==
- List of mortals in Greek mythology
