= Eilissus =

In Greek mythology, Elissus (Ancient Greek: Εἰλισσόν) was an Achaean warrior who participated in the Trojan War. He was slain by the Amazon queen, Penthesilia.
