= Iamenus =

Trojan hero in the Iliad

In Greek mythology, Iamenus (/aɪˈæmɪnəs/ eye-AM-in-əs; Ancient Greek: Ἰαμενός) was a Trojan hero in the Iliad. Together with Asius, he was slain by Leonteus during the attack of the Trojans on the camp of the Greeks.
