= Lycophron (mythology) =

Greek mythological figure

In Greek mythology, Lycophron (/ˈlaɪkəfrɒn/ LY-kə-fron; Ancient Greek: Λυκόφρων, romanized: Lukóphrōn, lit. 'wolf-minded') is a squire of Ajax the Greater during the Trojan War.

== Mythology ==
Lycophron was the son of Mastor and a native of Cythera, but became a fugitive after he had slain a man in his homeland. He fled to Salamis and dwelt there before the events of the war. During the siege of Troy, Lycophron was smitten by Hector upon the head just above the ear with a bright spear. This sharp bronze was hurled by the Trojan hero intended for the Salaminian prince but missed him and killed the Cytherean.
