= List of Homeric characters =

This is a list of principal characters in Homer's Iliad and Odyssey.

== Greeks in the Trojan War ==
- Achilles (Ἀχιλλεύς), the leader of the Myrmidons (Μυρμιδόνες), son of Peleus and Thetis, and the principal Greek champion whose anger is one of the main elements of the Iliad.
- Agamemnon (Ἀγαμέμνων), King of Mycenae, supreme commander of the Achaean armies whose actions provoke the feud with Achilles; elder brother of King Menelaus.
- Ajax or Aias (Αίας), also known as Telamonian Ajax (he was the son of Telamon) and Greater Ajax, was the tallest and strongest warrior (after Achilles) to fight for the Achaeans.
- Ajax the Lesser, an Achaean commander, son of Oileus often fights alongside Great Ajax; the two together are sometimes called the "Ajaxes" (Αἴαντε, Aiante).
- Antilochus (Ἀντίλοχος), son of Nestor sacrificed himself to save his father in the Trojan War along with other deeds of valor
- Calchas (Κάλχας), a powerful Greek prophet and omen reader, who guided the Greeks through the war with his predictions.
- Diomedes (Διομήδης, also called "Tydides"), the youngest of the Achaean commanders, famous for wounding two gods, Aphrodite and Ares.
- Idomeneus (Ιδομενέας), King of Crete and Achaean commander. Leads a charge against the Trojans in Book 13.
- Menelaus (Μενέλαος), King of Sparta and the abandoned husband of Helen. He is the younger brother of Agamemnon.
- Nestor (Νέστωρ), of Gerênia and the son of Neleus. He was said to be the only one of his brothers to survive an assault from Heracles. Oldest member of the entire Greek army at Troy.
- Odysseus (Ὀδυσσεύς), another warrior-king, famed for his cunning, who is the main character of another (roughly equally ancient) epic, the Odyssey.
- Patroclus (Πάτροκλος), beloved companion of Achilles.
- Phoenix (Φοῖνιξ), an old Achaean warrior, greatly trusted by Achilles, who acts as mediator between Achilles and Agamemnon.
- Teucer (Τεῦκρος), Achaean archer, half-brother of Ajax.

== Trojans in the siege of Troy ==
- Aeneas (Αἰνείας), son of Aphrodite; cousin of Hector; Hector's principal lieutenant; the only major Trojan figure to survive the war. Held by later tradition to be the forefather of the founders of Rome. See the Aeneid.
- Agenor (Ἀγήνωρ), a Trojan warrior who attempts to fight Achilles in Book 21.
- Andromache (Ἀνδρομάχη), wife of Hector and later slave of Achilles' son, Neoptolemus after the war.
- Antenor (Ἀντήνωρ), a Trojan nobleman who argues that Helen should be returned to Menelaus in order to end the war. In some versions he ends up betraying Troy by helping the Greeks unseal the city gates.
- Cassandra (Κασσάνδρα), a daughter of King Priam and Queen Hecuba; Cassandra's prophecies are ignored as a result of displeasing Apollo.
- Glaucus (Γλαῦκος), co-leader, with his cousin Sarpedon, of the Lycian forces allied to the Trojan cause.
- Hector (Ἕκτωρ), firstborn son of King Priam, husband of Andromache, father of Astyanax; leader of the Trojan and allied armies, and heir apparent to the throne of Troy.
- Helen (Ἑλένη), wife of Paris and former wife of Menelaus, the King of Sparta. Paris visited Menelaus in Sparta. With the assistance of Aphrodite, Paris and Helen fell in love and eloped together, but in Sparta her elopement is considered an abduction.
- Laodice (Λαοδίκη), the most beautiful daughter of Priam.
- Lycaon (Λυκάων), a son of Priam and Laothoe, daughter of the Lelegian king Altes; not to be confused with Lycaon, the father of Pandarus of Zeleia, who fought at Troy.
- Pandarus (Πάνδαρος), archer who shoots and wounds Menelaus with an arrow, sabotaging an attempt to reclaim Helen.
- Paris (Πάρις), Trojan prince and Hector's brother; also called Alexander. His marriage with Helen is the casus belli of the Trojan War.
- Polydamas (Πολυδάμας), a young Trojan commander, a lieutenant and friend of Hector.
- Priam (Πρίαμος), king of the Trojans, son and successor of Laomedon; husband of Queen Hecuba, father of Hector and Paris; too old to take part in the fighting; many of his fifty sons are counted among the Trojan commanders.
- Sarpedon (Σαρπηδών), a son of Zeus and Laodamia, daughter of Bellerophon; co-leader, with his cousin Glaucus, of the Lycian forces allied to the Trojan cause.
- Theano (Θεανώ) was the priestess of Athena in Troy and wife of Antenor.

== Allies of the Trojans ==
- Memnon, a king of Ethiopia who fought on the side of Troy during the Trojan War
- Rhesus, a king of Thrace who sided with Troy in the Trojan War
- Penthesilea (Πενθεσίλεια), an Amazon queen who fought in the Trojan War on the side of Troy

== Family and servants of Odysseus ==
- Penelope, Odysseus' faithful wife. She uses her quick wits to put off her many suitors and remain loyal to her errant husband.
- Telemachus, the son of Odysseus and Penelope, who matures during his travels to Sparta and Pylos and then fights Penelope's suitors with Odysseus.
- Argos, loyal hunting dog of Odysseus.
- Laertes, father of Odysseus.
- Anticlea, mother of Odysseus and wife of Laertes. She is only briefly mentioned, having died from the grief of missing her son while he is away.
- Eurycleia, Odysseus' former wet nurse, the first person to recognize him upon his return to Ithaca.
- Eumaeus, a loyal old friend and swineherd of Odysseus, who helps him retake his palace.
- Melantho, a favorite slave of Penelope's, though undeserving. She works against her mistress, sleeps with Eurymachus, and is rude to guests. After Odysseus kills the suitors, Telemachus hangs her for her disloyalty.

== Soldiers of Odysseus ==
- Eurylochus, Odysseus' second in command in The Odyssey.
- Elpenor, the youngest of Odysseus' soldiers in The Odyssey.
- Perimedes, a particularly loyal soldier of Odysseus.
- Alcimus, Lycaon, Amphialos, Amphidamas and Antilochus, the only five besides Odysseus and Eurylochus to survive the fight against the Cyclops Polyphemus.
- Antiphus, one of the six men killed during the fight against Polyphemus.
- Polites, Odysseus' best friend and one of his men in the Illiad and The Odyssey, although he is barely ever mentioned.

== Suitors of Penelope ==
- Amphinomus
- Antinous
- Eurymachus
- Leocritus

== Slaves ==
- Aethra, the principal slave in Helen's household at Troy. She was the mother of Theseus, stolen many years before the Trojan War by the Dioscuri as revenge for her son's kidnapping of their sister Helen.
- Briseis, a woman captured in the sack of Lyrnessus, a small town in the territory of Troy, and awarded to Achilles as a prize. Agamemnon takes her from Achilles in Book 1 and Achilles withdraws from battle as a result.
- Chryseis, Chryses’ daughter, taken as a war prize by Agamemnon.
- Clymene, servant of Helen along with her mother Aethra.
- Diomede, a slave woman of Achilles' whom he took from Lesbos.
- Hecamede, a woman taken from Tenedos and given to Nestor. She mixes his medicinal wines.
- Iphis, a woman from Skyros whom Achilles gave to Patroclus.
- Phylo, maid of Helen.

== Deities ==
- Aphrodite, goddess of love, beauty, and sexual pleasure. Wife of Hephaestus, and lover of Ares.
- Apollo, god of the sun, light, knowledge, healing, plague and darkness, the arts, music, poetry, prophecy, archery. Son of Zeus and Leto, twin of Artemis.
- Ares, god of war. Lover of Aphrodite. Driven from the field of battle by Diomedes (aided by Athena).
- Athena, goddess of crafts, domestic arts, strategic warfare, and wisdom. Daughter of Zeus.
- Eos, goddess of dawn.
- Hephaestus, god of blacksmiths, craftsmen, artisans, sculptors, metals, metallurgy, fire and volcanoes.
- Hera, goddess of birth, family, marriage, and women. Sister and wife of Zeus, queen of the gods.
- Hermes, messenger of the gods, leads Priam into Achilles' camp in book 24.
- Iris, messenger of Zeus and Hera.
- Poseidon, god of the sea and earthquake, brother of Zeus. Curses Odysseus.
- Scamander, river god who fought on the side of the Trojans during the Trojan War
- Thetis, a sea nymph or goddess. Mother of Achilles, wife of Peleus.
- Zeus, king of the gods, brother of Poseidon and Hera and father of Athena, Aphrodite, Ares, and Apollo.

== Bibliography ==
- Homer, The Iliad with an English Translation by A.T. Murray, Ph.D. in two volumes. Cambridge, MA., Harvard University Press; London, William Heinemann, Ltd. 1924. Online version at the Perseus Digital Library.
