= Opheltius =

In Greek mythology, the name of two soldiers in the Trojan War

In Greek mythology, Opheltius (Ancient Greek: Ὀφέλτιος, romanized: Ophéltios), is the name of two soldiers in the Trojan War on each side of the conflict:

- Opheltius, a defender of Troy killed by Euryalus.
- Opheltius, an Achaean killed by Hector.
