= Mentes (King of the Cicones) =

Greek mythological figure in the Iliad

In Greek mythology, Mentes (Ancient Greek: Μέντης) was the king of the Cicones.

== Mythology ==
In Book XVII of the Iliad, Apollo disguises himself as Mentes to encourage Hector to fight Menelaus, ("Hector, now you're going after something you'll not catch, chasing the horses of warrior Achilles, descendant of Aeacus. No mortal man, except Achilles, can control or drive them, for an immortal mother gave him birth. Meanwhile, warrior Menelaus, Atreus' son, standing by Patroclus, has just killed the best man of the Trojans, Euphorbus, son of Panthous, ending his brave fight.")
