= Arne (Boeotia) =

Town of ancient Boeotia

Coordinates: 38°28′58″N 22°56′00″E

Arne (Ancient Greek: Ἄρνη) was a town of ancient Boeotia, mentioned by Homer, and probably founded by the Boeotians after their expulsion from ancient Thessaly. Pausanias identified this Boeotian Arne with Chaeroneia, Strabo with Acraephium; and others again supposed that it had been swallowed up by the waters of the Lake Copais. Modern scholars locate Arne with the site of archaeological site of Magoula Balomenou. Alternately, Arne may be linked to the ancient citadel of Gla, whose Mycenaean name has been lost, though this is by no means uncontested.
