= Menestheus =

Mythical king of Athens during the Trojan War

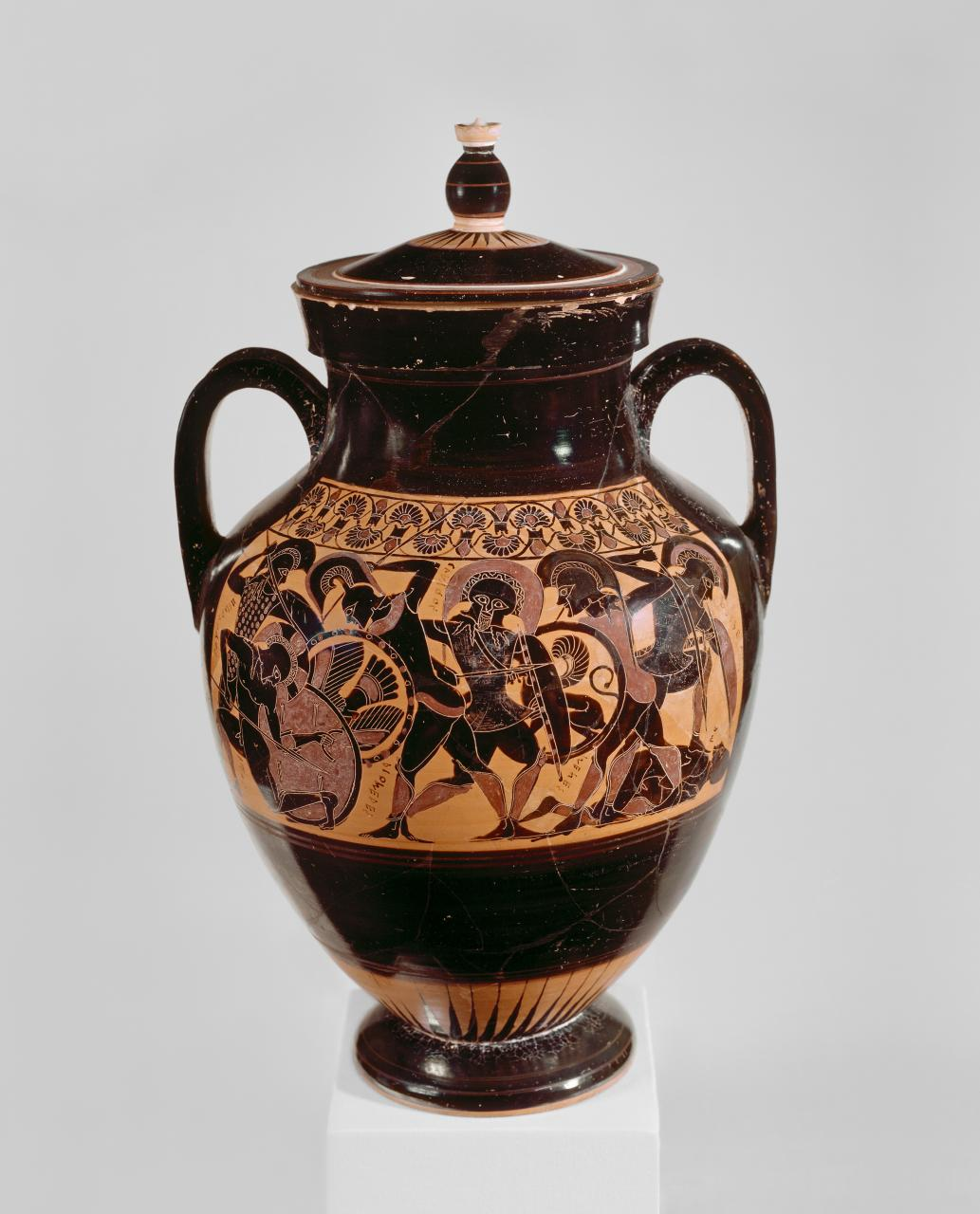
Scenes of fighting from the Trojan War, with Glaucus (frontal, centre) and Menestheus

In Greek mythology, Menestheus (/mɪˈnɛsθiːəs/; Ancient Greek: Μενεσθεύς, lit. 'steadfast in strength' or 'one who remains strong/ vigorous')was a legendary king of Athens during the Trojan War. He was set up as king by the twins Castor and Pollux when Theseus travelled to the Underworld after abducting their sister, Helen, and exiled Theseus from the city after his return.

== Family ==
Menestheus was the son of Peteus, son of Orneus, son of Erechtheus, one of the early kings of Athens. His mother was called Polyxene or Mnesimache.

== Mythology ==
Menestheus was one of the suitors of Helen of Troy, and when the Trojan War started he brought "fifty black ships" to Troy. In the Iliad, it is noted that no one could arrange chariots and shield-bearing warriors in battle orders better than Menestheus, and that only Nestor could vie with him in that respect. In Herodotus, he is referred to as 'the best man to go to Troy and to draw up and marshal the troops' by the Athenian sent to request aid from Gelon, the dictator of Syracuse.

Yet, further, he is characterised as not valiant. When Agamemnon was reviewing his troops he found Menestheus in the back rows seemingly avoiding action. Later, when Sarpedon attacked the portion of the Greek wall that he was in charge of, Menestheus shivered and had to call on Telamonian Ajax and Teucer for aid. Menestheus was one of the warriors in the Trojan Horse. After Troy was sacked, he sailed to Mimas, then to Melos where he became king.

When Menestheus died, (after, according to Eusebius, a 23 year reign) Athens passed back to the family of Theseus, with Theseus' youngest son Demophon ascending to the throne.

Regnal titles
Preceded by Theseus	King of Athens; 23 years	Succeeded by Demophon

== Eponym ==
- 4068 Menestheus, Jovian asteroid
