= Alcyoneus (mythology) =

In Greek mythology, Alcyoneus or Alkyoneus (/ælˈsaɪ.əˌnjuːs/; Ancient Greek: Ἀλκυονεύς, romanized: Alkyoneús) may refer to the following characters:

- Alcyoneus, one of the Gigantes and an opponent of Heracles.
- Alcyoneus, son of Diomus, who was intended as a sacrifice to the monster Sybaris.
- Alcyoneus, an alternate name for Ischys, the son of Elatus and Hippea, and also the lover of Coronis.
- Alcyoneus, a member of the Ethiopian army who followed their leader, King Memnon, to fight on the side of the Trojans during the Trojan War.
