= Agestratus =

Mythological Trojan warrior

In Greek mythology, Agestratus (Ancient Greek: Ἀγέστρατον, lit. 'host-leading' or 'leader of an army') was a Trojan warrior who participated in the Trojan War.

== Mythology ==
During the siege of Troy, Agestratus was killed by the Greek hero, Ajax the Great.

“So naught of all their onsets Aias; But first he stabbed Agelaus in the breast, And slew that son of Maion: Thestor next: Ocythous he smote, Agestratus, Aganippus, Zorus, Nessus, Erymas The war-renowned, who came from Lycia-land With mighty-hearted Glaucus, from his home”
