= Zorus =

In Greek mythology, Zorus (Ancient Greek: ζωρόν, romanized: Zōron or Zōros, lit. 'pure' or 'sheer'; pronounced /ˈzɔːrəs/, ZOR-us) was a Trojan warrior who participated in the Trojan War.

== Mythology ==
During the siege of Troy, Zorus was killed by the Achaean hero, Ajax the Greater.

“So naught of all their onsets Aias;
But first he stabbed Agelaus in the breast,
And slew that son of Maion: Thestor next:
Ocythous he smote, Agestratus,
Aganippus, Zorus, Nessus, Erymas
The war-renowned, who came from Lycia-land
With mighty-hearted Glaucus, from his home”

— Quintus Smyrnaeus, Posthomerica 3.227-232
