= Aganippus =

Trojan warrior in Greek mythology

In Greek mythology, Aganippus (Ancient Greek: Ἀγάνιππος, romanized: Aganippos, lit. 'gentle horse' or 'mild steed') was a Trojan warrior who participated in the Trojan War.

== Mythology ==
During the siege of Troy, Aganippus was killed by the Greek hero, Ajax the Great.

“So naught of all their onsets Aias;
But first he stabbed Agelaus in the breast,
And slew that son of Maion: Thestor next:
Ocythous he smote, Agestratus,
Aganippus, Zorus, Nessus, Erymas
The war-renowned, who came from Lycia-land
With mighty-hearted Glaucus, from his home”

— Quintus Smyrnaeus, Posthomerica 3.227-232
