= List of Shakespearean characters (A–K) =

Characters appearing in the plays of William Shakespeare whose names begin with the letters A to K include the following.

Characters who exist outside Shakespeare are marked "(hist)" where they are historical, and "(myth)" where they are mythical. Where that annotation is a link (e.g. (hist)), it is a link to the page for the historical or mythical figure. The annotation "(fict)" is only used in entries for the English history plays, and indicates a character who is fictional.

== A ==
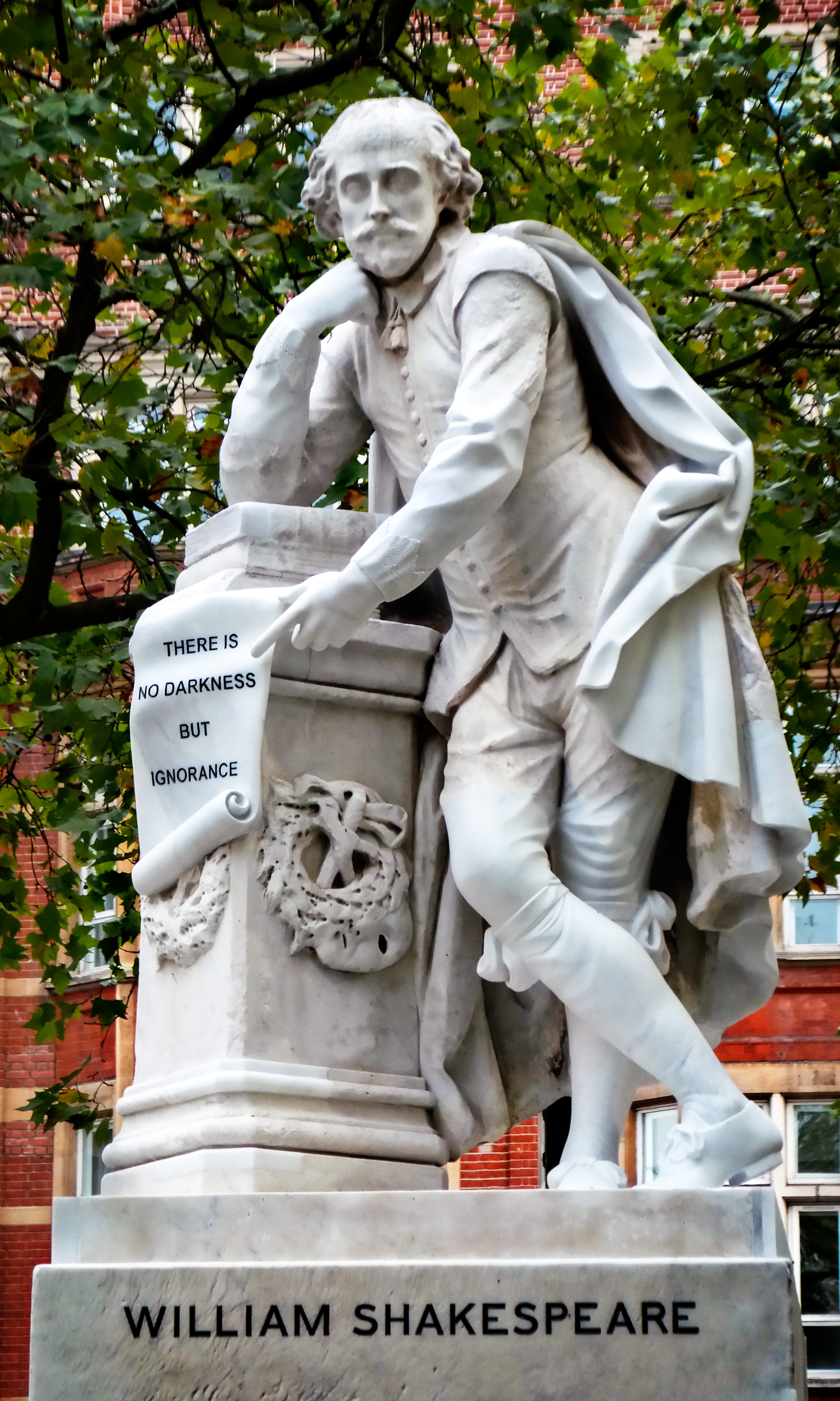
Statue of William Shakespeare, who, according to legend, played Adam in his own play As You Like It.

- Aaron is an evil Moorish character in Titus Andronicus. He incites most of the other evil characters to do violence against the house of Andronicus.
- The Abbott of Westminster (fict) supports Richard and the Bishop of Carlisle in Richard II.
- Lord Abergavenny (hist) is Buckingham's son-in-law in Henry VIII.
- Abhorson is an executioner in Measure for Measure.
- Abraham Slender is a foolish suitor to Anne, and a kinsman of Shallow, in The Merry Wives of Windsor.
- Abraham, a Montague servant, fights Sampson and Gregory in the first scene of Romeo and Juliet. Sometimes spelled "Abram".
- Achilles (myth) is portrayed as a former hero, who has become lazy and devoted to the love of Patroclus, in Troilus and Cressida.
- Adam is a kindly old servant, rumoured to have been played by Shakespeare himself, in As You Like It.
- Adrian:
  - Adrian is a lord, a follower of Alonso, in The Tempest.
  - For Adrian in Coriolanus, see Volsce.
- Adriana is the frequently angry wife of Antipholus of Ephesus in The Comedy of Errors.
- Don Adriano de Armado is an arrogant Spanish braggart in Love's Labour's Lost.
- Aediles (officers attending on the Tribunes) appear in Coriolanus. One is a speaking role.
- For Aegeon (or AEgeon or Ægeon) see Egeon.
- Aemelia is an abbess in The Comedy of Errors. She proves to be the long-lost wife of Egeon, and the long-lost mother of the Antipholus twins.
- Aemilius:
  - Aemilius or Emillius is Roman nobleman who acts as ambassador between Saturninus and Lucius in Titus Andronicus.
  - Marcus Aemilius Lepidus (hist) is one of the Triumvirs. the three rulers of Rome after Caesar's death, in Julius Caesar and Antony and Cleopatra.
- Aeneas (myth) is a Trojan leader in Troilus and Cressida.
- For Aenobarbus (or AEnobarbus or Ænobarbus) see Enobarbus.
- Agamemnon (myth) is the general leader of the Greek forces, in Troilus and Cressida.
- Agrippa:
  - Agrippa (hist), a follower of Caesar in Antony and Cleopatra, proposes that the widowed Antony should marry Octavia.
  - Menenius Agrippa in Coriolanus is a friend and supporter of Coriolanus in his political struggles.
- Sir Andrew Aguecheek is a foolish knight, and suitor to Olivia, in Twelfth Night.
- Ajax (myth) is the (sometimes foolish) champion of the Greeks in Troilus and Cressida.
- Alarbus is the eldest son of Tamora, sacrificed by Titus' sons, in Titus Andronicus.
- The Mayor of St. Albans appears briefly in the "Simpcox" episode in Henry VI, Part 2.
- The Duke of Albany is Goneril's husband in King Lear.
- Alcibiades (hist) is a soldier who turns renegade when one of his junior officers is sentenced to death, and true friend of Timon in Timon of Athens.
- The Duke of Alençon (hist) is one of the French leaders in Henry VI, Part 1.
- Alexander:
  - Alexander is Cressida's servant in Troilus and Cressida.
  - Alexander Court (fict) is a soldier in the English army in Henry V.
  - Alexander Iden (hist) kills Jack Cade in Henry VI, Part 2.
- Alexas is a follower of Cleopatra, in Antony and Cleopatra.
- Alice:
  - Alice (fict) gives the French princess Katharine an English lesson in Henry V.
  - See also Mistress Ford, whose first name is Alice.
- For Aliena see Celia from As You Like It, who calls herself Aliena while in her self-imposed exile in the Forest of Arden.
- Alonso is the King of Naples, an enemy to Prospero, in The Tempest. He mourns for his son, Ferdinand, whom he believes is drowned.
- Ambassador:
  - Some ambassadors from France present Henry with a gift of tennis balls from the Dauphin, in Henry V.
  - Some ambassadors from England bring news that Rosencrantz and Guildenstern are dead, in Hamlet.
  - Several characters act as Ambassadors, including Cornelius (in Hamlet), Lucius (in Cymbeline), Montjoy and Voltemand.
  - See also Schoolmaster, in Antony and Cleopatra.
- Amiens is a follower of Duke Senior in As You Like It.
- For Ancient (in the military sense – a standard-bearer), see Iago and Pistol.
- Andromache (myth) is Hector's wife in Troilus and Cressida.
- Andronicus:
  - Marcus Andronicus is the brother of Titus Andronicus.
  - Titus Andronicus is the central character of Titus Andronicus. Broken and sent mad by Tamora and her followers, he eventually exacts his revenge by killing her sons, and cooking them for her to eat.
  - See also Lavinia, Lucius, Quintus, Martius, Mutius and Young Lucius, members of the Andronicus family in Titus Andronicus. Also Sempronius, Caius and Valentine in the same play are "kinsmen" of the Andronicus house.
- Angelica is Juliet Capulet's nurse in Romeo and Juliet.
- Angelo:
  - Angelo deputises for the Duke during the latter's absence from Vienna, but proves corrupt, seeking the sexual favours of Isabella, in Measure for Measure.
  - Angelo is a goldsmith who has been commissioned to make a chain by Antipholus of Ephesus, which he delivers to Antipholus of Syracuse in error. Antipholus of Ephesus later refuses to pay for it, causing much consternation, in The Comedy of Errors.
- Angus is a thane in Macbeth.
- Anne:
  - Anne Bullen (hist), known to history as Anne Boleyn, is a maid of Honour to Katherine and later becomes King Henry's second wife, in Henry VIII.
  - Anne Page is the daughter of Master and Mistress Page in The Merry Wives of Windsor. She loves Fenton, but her father wishes her to marry Slender and her mother wishes her to marry Caius.
  - Lady Anne (hist) is the widow of Prince Edward, wooed by Richard over the corpse of her late father-in-law (Henry VI) in Richard III.
- Antenor is a Trojan leader in Troilus and Cressida.
- For Anthony see Antony/Anthony below.
- Antigonus is a courtier of Leontes in The Winter's Tale, who takes the infant Perdita to Bohemia. He famously exits, pursued by a bear, which eats him.
- Antiochus is king of Antioch in Pericles, Prince of Tyre; he engages in an incestuous relationship with his daughter. He orders the death of Pericles, who has discovered his secret.
- Antipholus:
  - Antipholus of Ephesus, twin of Antipholus of Syracuse – with whom he is often confused, is a central character in The Comedy of Errors.
  - Antipholus of Syracuse, twin of Antipholus of Ephesus – with whom he is often confused, is a central character in The Comedy of Errors.
- Antonio:
  - Antonio is the title character, although not the central character, of The Merchant of Venice. Shylock claims a pound of his flesh.
  - Antonio is the brother of Leonato in Much Ado About Nothing.
  - Antonio is a sea captain who rescues, and loves, Sebastian in Twelfth Night.
  - Antonio is the brother of Prospero in The Tempest. He conspires with Sebastian to murder Alonzo and Gonzalo.
  - Antonio is Proteus' father, in The Two Gentlemen of Verona.
- Antony/Anthony:
  - For Anthony in Romeo and Juliet see Servingmen.
  - Mark Antony (hist) (Often just Antony, and sometimes Marcus Antonius) turns the mob against Caesar's killers and becomes a Triumvir in Julius Caesar. His romance with Cleopatra drives the action of Antony and Cleopatra.
  - Sir Anthony Denny (hist) is a minor character in Henry VIII, who brings Cranmer to the King.
- Apemantus is a churlish philosopher in Timon of Athens.
- Three Apparitions appear to Macbeth with prophecies, in Macbeth.
- Apothecary is a small but vital role in Romeo and Juliet. He sells Romeo the poison which ends his life.
- For Aragon, see Arragon/Aragon, below.
- For Arcas, see Countryman.
- Archbishop:
  - Archbishop of Canterbury:
    - The Archbishop of Canterbury (hist) is an important character in the first act of Henry V. He expounds Henry's claim to the French throne.
    - Thomas Cranmer, Archbishop of Canterbury (hist) is a major character in the last act of Henry VIII: hauled before the privy council by his enemies and threatened with imprisonment, but protected by the king.
    - See also Cardinal Bourchier, who was Archbishop of Canterbury at the time dramatised in Richard III.
  - Archbishop of York:
    - The Archbishop of York (1) (hist) is one of the rebel leaders in Henry IV, Part 1 and Henry IV, Part 2.
    - The Archbishop of York (2) (hist) assists Queen Elizabeth and the little Duke of York to obtain sanctuary in Richard III.
- For Archibald, see Earl of Douglas.
- Archidamus is a Bohemian lord in The Winter's Tale.
- Arcite and Palamon are the title characters of The Two Noble Kinsmen. Their friendship endures even though they engage in a mortal quarrel for the love of Emilia.
- Ariel is a spirit, controlled (but eventually freed) by Prospero in The Tempest.
- Don Adriano de Armado is an arrogant Spanish braggart in Love's Labour's Lost.
- Arragon/Aragon:
  - The Prince of Arragon is an unsuccessful suitor to Portia in The Merchant of Venice.
  - Queen Katherine of Aragon (hist) is the first wife of King Henry in Henry VIII. She falls from grace, is divorced and dies.
  - See also Don Pedro, who is a prince of Arragon.
- Artemidorus prepares a scroll warning Julius Caesar of danger, and tries to present it to Caesar in the form of a petition. Caesar refuses to accept it.
- Arthur (hist) is a child, the nephew of the king in King John. He persuades Hubert not to put out his eyes, but dies in an attempt to escape captivity.
- Arviragus (also known as Cadwal) is the second son of the king in Cymbeline, stolen away in infancy by Morgan, and brought up as Morgan's child.
- For Astringer, meaning a keeper of hawks, see Gentleman in All's Well That Ends Well, who is described as the "Astringer to the King" in his entry stage direction.
- An Old Athenian in Timon of Athens objects to his daughter's involvement with Lucilius, until Timon offers to endow Lucilius with money to make him her equal.
- An attendant on the King of France speaks four words, "I shall, my liege", in All's Well That Ends Well.
- Audrey is a country girl who marries Touchstone in As You Like It.
- Tullus Aufidius, leader of the Volscians, is the arch-enemy, and briefly the ally, of the title character in Coriolanus.
- Aumerle (hist) is a companion of Richard in Richard II.
- For Duke of Austria see Limoges.
- Autolycus is a rogue, singer, and snapper up of unconsidered trifles in The Winter's Tale.
- The Countess of Auvergne (hist) tries to entrap Talbot in Henry VI, Part 1.

== B ==
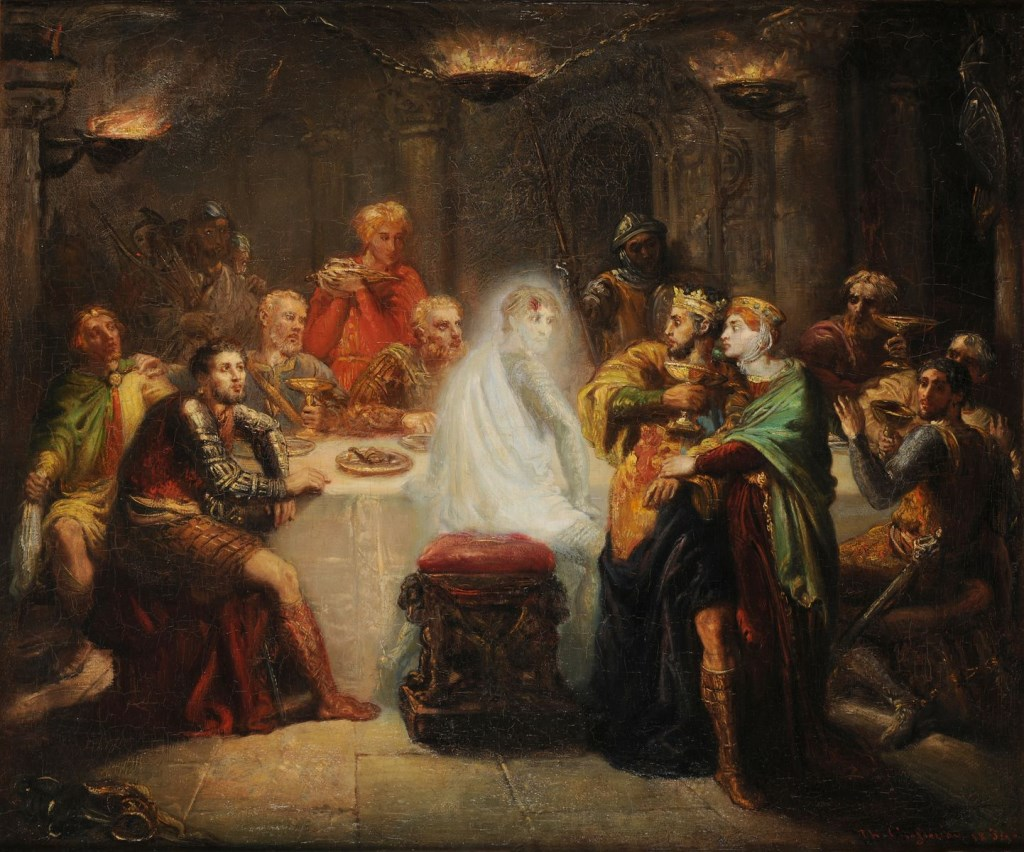
Théodore Chassériau (1819–1856), The Ghost of Banquo, 1855

- Bagot (hist) is a favourite of Richard in Richard II.
- Balthasar:
  - Balthasar is Romeo's servant in Romeo and Juliet.
  - Balthasar is a singer, attending on Don Pedro in Much Ado About Nothing.
  - Balthasar is a merchant in The Comedy of Errors.
  - Balthasar is a servant of Portia in The Merchant of Venice.
  - See also Portia in The Merchant of Venice, who takes the name Balthasar in her disguise as a lawyer from Rome.
- Three Bandits in Timon of Athens seek Timon's gold, but he persuades them to give up villainy.
- Banquo is a captain in Macbeth who, with Macbeth, meets the three witches and hears their prophecies. He is later murdered on Macbeth's orders, but his ghost haunts Macbeth at a feast.
- Baptista Minola is the father of Katherine and Bianca in The Taming of the Shrew.
- For Barbary, see Countrywomen.
- Bardolph:
  - Bardolph (fict) is a follower of Sir John Falstaff in Henry IV, Part 1 and Henry IV, Part 2. In The Merry Wives of Windsor he becomes a drawer for the Host of the Garter. He is hanged for stealing a pax in Henry V.
  - Lord Bardolph (hist) is a nobleman, one of the Percy faction, in Henry IV, Part 2.
- Barnardine is too drunk to consent to be executed, in Measure for Measure.
- Barnardo (or Bernardo) and Marcellus are soldiers who invite Horatio to see the ghost of Old Hamlet, in Hamlet.
- For Bartholomew, or Barthol'mew, see the Page in the induction to The Taming of the Shrew.
- Bassanio, loved by Antonio, is the suitor who wins the heart of Portia in The Merchant of Venice.
- Basset (fict) is a follower of the Duke of Somerset, in Henry VI, Part 1.
- Bassianus is the younger brother of Saturninus, and is betrothed to Lavinia, in Titus Andronicus. Chiron and Demetrius murder him, laying the blame on Martius and Quintus.
- Bastard:
  - The Bastard of Orleans (hist) is one of the French leaders in Henry VI, Part 1.
  - Philip (the Bastard) Faulconbridge is a central character in King John, the bravest and most articulate of John's supporters.
  - Several characters are bastards, most notably Don John and Edmund.
- John Bates (fict) is a soldier in the English army in Henry V.
- A Bavian (a baboon) is played by one of the Maying entertainers in The Two Noble Kinsmen.
- A Bawd and a Pander run the brothel into which Marina is sold, in Pericles, Prince of Tyre.
- Beadle:
  - A Beadle arrests Doll Tearsheet in Henry IV, Part 2.
  - A Beadle whips Simpcox in Henry VI, Part 2.
- For Beaufort see Bishop of Winchester.
- Beatrice is a central character in Much Ado About Nothing. She falls in love with Benedick.
- For Bedford see Prince John of Lancaster, who was the Duke of Bedford.
- Belarius (also known as Morgan) steals the two infant princes in Cymbeline, and raises them as his own.
- Sir Toby Belch is a drunken knight, and kinsman to Olivia, in Twelfth Night.
- Benedick is a central character in Much Ado About Nothing. He falls in love with Beatrice.
- Benvolio is a friend and kinsman of Romeo in Romeo and Juliet.
- Berkeley:
  - Berkeley and Tressell (fict) are the two gentlemen accompanying Lady Anne, and Henry VI's coffin, in Richard III.
  - Lord Berkeley (hist) acts as messenger from York to Bolingbroke, in Richard II.
- Berowne (hist) is a witty lord of Navarre in Love's Labour's Lost. He breaks his oath by falling in love with Rosaline.
- The Duke of Berry (hist) is a French leader in Henry V.
- Bertram is the Count of Roussillon in All's Well That Ends Well. He is married, against his will, to Helena.
- Bianca:
  - Bianca is the younger sister of Katherine in The Taming of the Shrew. She is loved by Gremio and Hortensio, and eventually marries Lucentio.
  - Bianca is Michael Cassio's mistress in Othello.
- Lord Bigot, together with Salisbury and Pembroke, fear for the life of young Arthur, and later discover his body, in King John.
- Biondello is a servant to Lucentio in The Taming of the Shrew.
- Bishop (title):
  - The Bishop of Carlisle (hist) supports Richard in Richard II.
  - Bishop of Ely:
    - The Bishop of Ely (1) (hist) conspires with the Archbishop of Canterbury in the opening scene of Henry V.
    - The Bishop of Ely (2) (hist) ultimately shows his opposition to Richard, in Richard III.
  - The Bishop of Lincoln (hist) speaks in favour of Henry's divorce, in the trial scene of Henry VIII.
  - Bishop of Winchester:
    - The Bishop of Winchester (hist) (later "the Cardinal") is the chief enemy of Humphrey Duke of Gloucester in Henry VI, Part 1 and Henry VI, Part 2.
    - For The Bishop of Winchester in Henry VIII, see Gardiner.
- Blanche (hist) is the king's niece in King John, married (by arrangement among the kings, to seal an alliance) to the Dauphin.
- Blunt:
  - Sir James Blunt is a supporter of Richmond in Richard III.
  - Sir John Blunt is a supporter of the king in Henry IV, Part 2.
  - Sir Walter Blunt is a soldier and messenger to the king in Henry IV, Part 1. He is killed by Douglas while wearing the king's armour.
- The Boatswain is a character in the first and last acts of The Tempest.
- Bolingbroke:
  - Bolingbroke, later King Henry IV (hist) leads a revolt against King Richard in Richard II. He is the title character of Henry IV, Part 1 and Henry IV, Part 2 which chart the rebellions against him by the Percy faction, and his difficult relationship with his eldest son, Hal.
  - Bolingbroke, with Southwell, Jourdain and Hume, are the supernatural conspirators with Eleanor Duchess of Gloucester in Henry VI, Part 2.
- Lady Bona (hist) is King Lewis's sister-in-law, whose hopes to marry Edward are thwarted, in Henry VI, Part 3.
- Borachio is a villain, a servant of Don John, in Much Ado About Nothing.
- Nick Bottom is a weaver, one of the mechanicals, in A Midsummer Night's Dream. While rehearsing a play, Puck changes Bottom's head for an ass's head. Titania falls in love with him. He plays Pyramus in Pyramus and Thisbe.
- Boult is a servant of the Pander and the Bawd in Pericles, Prince of Tyre. He resolves to rape Marina, but is persuaded to help her to leave the brothel, instead.
- The Duke of Bourbon (hist) fights on the French side in Henry V.
- Cardinal Bourchier (hist) delivers the little Duke of York from sanctuary, and into the hands of Richard and Buckingham, in Richard III.
- Boy:
  - Boy (hist) in Richard III is the young son of the murdered Clarence (described in one speech as little Ned Plantagenet).
  - Boy is young Martius, son of Caius Martius Coriolanus, in Coriolanus.
  - The Boy (fict) is a follower of Sir John Falstaff in Henry IV, Part 2 and The Merry Wives of Windsor (in which he is called Robin). He is also a character in Henry V, who goes to war with Pistol, Bardolph and Nym.
  - A boy sings the wedding song which opens The Two Noble Kinsmen.
  - A boy is a servant of Troilus, in Troilus and Cressida.
  - A boy attends on Benedick in Much Ado About Nothing.
  - A boy sings a song to Mariana, in Measure for Measure.
  - A boy sings "Come, thou monarch of the vine...", in Antony and Cleopatra.
  - The Master Gunner's Boy kills Salisbury, in Henry VI, Part 1.
- Boyet, a French lord, is the Princess of France's personal assistant, in Love's Labour's Lost.
- Brabantio is the father of Desdemona, in Othello.
- Brackenbury (hist) is the Lieutenant of the Tower of London in Richard III.
- Brandon (hist) arrests Buckingham, in Henry VIII.
- The Duke of Britain (hist) is a French leader in Henry V.
- For Master Brook see Master Ford, who calls himself Master Brook when he disguises himself to encounter Falstaff.
- Brothers:
  - The Jailer's Brother accompanies his niece, in her madness, in The Two Noble Kinsmen.
  - See Leonatus
  - See Stafford's Brother.
- Brutus:
  - Decius Brutus (hist) is one of the conspirators against Caesar in Julius Caesar.
  - Junius Brutus and Sicinius Velutus, two of the tribunes of the people, are the protagonist's chief political enemies in Coriolanus, and prove more effective than his military foes.
  - Marcus Brutus (hist) (usually just Brutus) is a central character of Julius Caesar, who conspires against Caesar's life and stabs him.
- Buckingham:
  - The Duke of Buckingham (1) (hist) is a Lancastrian in Henry VI, Part 2. His death is reported in Henry VI, Part 3.
  - The Duke of Buckingham (2) (hist) is a Yorkist in Henry VI, Part 3, and is a co-conspirator with Richard – although he is eventually rejected, then murdered on Richard's orders – in Richard III.
  - The Duke of Buckingham (3) (hist), an enemy of Wolsey, falls from grace and is executed by Henry in Henry VIII.
- Bullcalf is nearly pressed into military service by Falstaff in Henry IV, Part 2.
- Anne Bullen (hist), known to history as Anne Boleyn, is a maid of Honour to Katherine who later becomes King Henry's second wife, in Henry VIII.
- Burgundy:
  - The Duke of Burgundy (1) (hist) brokers the peace treaty between the kings of France and England in the last act of Henry V, and fights firstly in alliance with the English, and later in alliance with the French, in Henry VI, Part 1.
  - The Duke of Burgundy (2) refuses to marry Cordelia without a dowry, in King Lear.
- Bushy (hist) is a favourite of Richard in Richard II.
- Dick the Butcher (fict) is a follower of Jack Cade in Henry VI, Part 2.
- Doctor Butts (hist) is the king's physician in Henry VIII. He alerts the king to Cranmer's humiliation in refused admittance to the council chamber.

== C ==
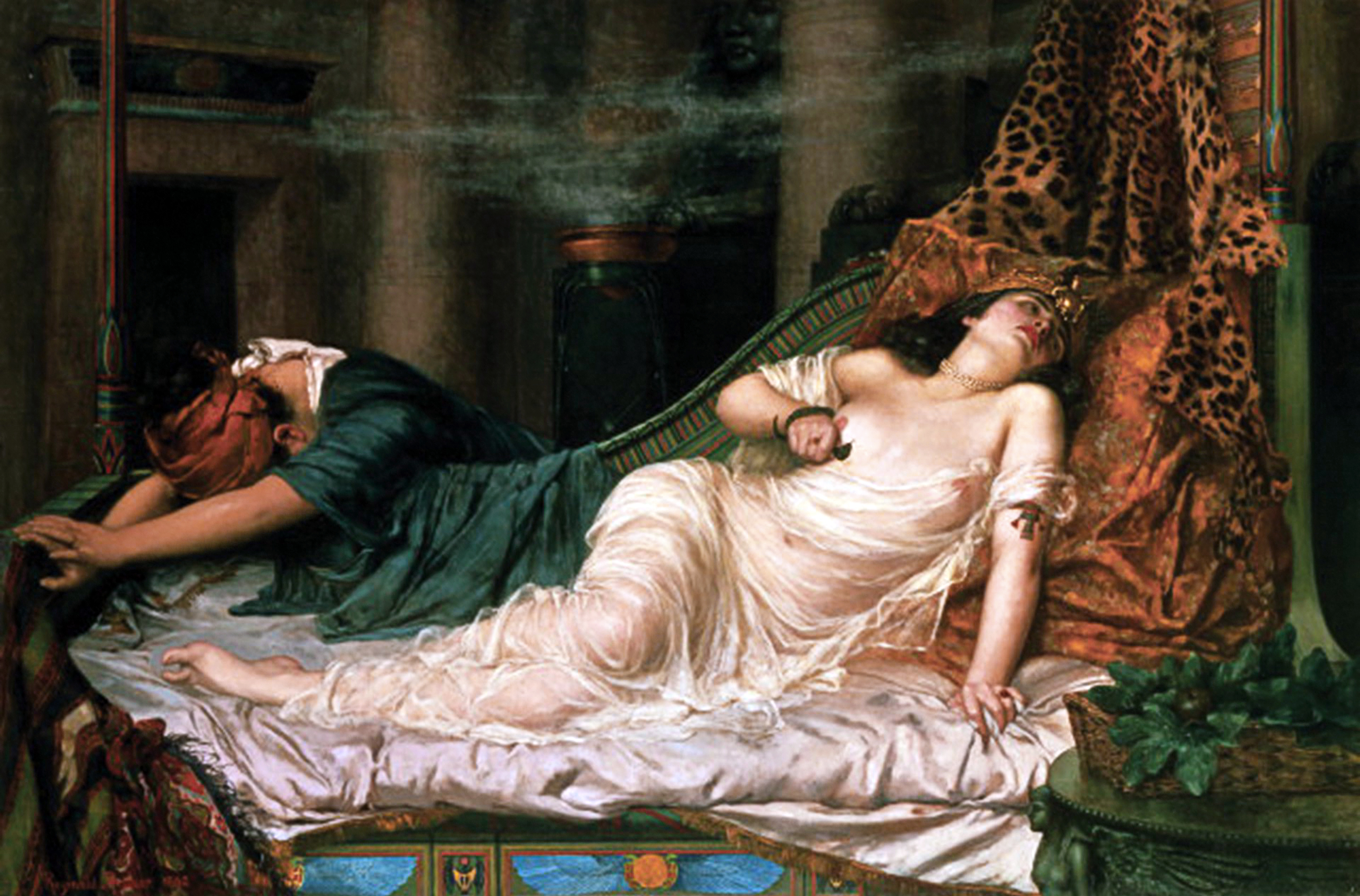
The Death of Cleopatra by Reginald Arthur

- Jack Cade (hist) leads a proletarian rebellion in Henry VI, Part 2.
- Cadwal (real name Arviragus) is the second son of the king in Cymbeline, stolen away in infancy by Morgan, and brought up as Morgan's child.
- Caesar:
  - Julius Caesar (hist) is the title character of Julius Caesar, an Emperor of Rome who is stabbed in the Capitol, on the Ides of March.
  - Octavius Caesar (hist) is one of the Triumvirs, the three rulers of Rome after Caesar's death, in Julius Caesar and Antony and Cleopatra.
- Caithness is a thane in Macbeth.
- Caius:
  - Caius, Sempronius and Valentine are minor characters, kinsmen and supporters of Titus, in Titus Andronicus.
  - Caius Cassius (hist) is a central character in Julius Caesar. He incites the conspiracy against Caesar, and recruits Brutus to the conspirators' ranks.
  - Caius Ligarius (hist) is one of the conspirators against Caesar in Julius Caesar.
  - Caius Lucius is the Roman ambassador in Cymbeline, and the leader of the Roman forces.
  - Caius Martius Coriolanus (hist) is the central character of Coriolanus, who earns the title "Coriolanus" in recognition of his skill at smiting Volscians in Coriolai.
  - Doctor Caius (hist-ish) is a French doctor in The Merry Wives of Windsor. He challenges Parson Hugh to a duel.
  - See also the Earl of Kent, who calls himself Caius in his disguise as a servant of King Lear.
- Calchas, Cressida's father, has defected to the Greeks, and negotiates his daughter's exchange for a Trojan prisoner in Troilus and Cressida.
- Caliban, son of the witch Sycorax, is a deformed slave to Prospero in The Tempest.
- Calphurnia (hist) has a dream that predicts the death of her husband, Caesar, in Julius Caesar.
- For Cambio see Lucentio, who calls himself Cambio in his disguise as a schoolmaster.
- The Earl of Cambridge (hist) is one of the three conspirators against the king's life (with Scroop and Grey) in Henry V.
- Camillo is a follower of Leontes, ordered to kill Polixines, but who instead warns Polixines of his danger and becomes his companion, in The Winter's Tale.
- Cardinal Campeius (hist) is the papal legate at the trial of Katherine, in Henry VIII.
- Canidius (hist) is a follower of Antony in Antony and Cleopatra.
- Canterbury:
  - The Archbishop of Canterbury (hist) is an important character in the first act of Henry V. He expounds Henry's claim to the French throne.
  - Thomas Cranmer, Archbishop of Canterbury (hist) is a major character in the last act of Henry VIII: hauled before the privy council by his enemies and threatened with imprisonment, but protected by the king.
  - See also Cardinal Bourchier, who was Archbishop of Canterbury at the time dramatised in Richard III.
- Caphis is the servant of a Senator in Timon of Athens, sent to collect a debt due from Timon.
- For Capilet see the Widow in All's Well That Ends Well, whose surname is Capilet.
- Captain:
  - A Captain survives the shipwreck at the start of Twelfth Night with Viola, and helps her with her disguise.
  - A Captain of the Welsh army brings Richard the bad news that his army, believing him dead, has deserted him, in Richard II.
  - A Captain brings Duncan news of Macbeth and Banquo's victories, in the first act of Macbeth.
  - A Captain attending on Edgar delivers Lear and Cordelia to be hanged in King Lear.
  - A Captain of the Norwegian army explains Fortinbras' mission against the Poles, in Hamlet.
  - A Captain in Antony's army is a minor speaking role in Antony and Cleopatra.
  - An English Captain witnesses the retreat of the cowardly Fastolfe, in Henry VI, Part 1.
  - An English Captain accompanies Lucy on his mission to obtain assistance from the English Lords, in Henry VI, Part 1.
  - A French Captain on the walls of Bordeaux defies Talbot, in Henry VI, Part 1.
  - A Roman Captain in Cymbeline attends on Lucius.
  - Two British Captains in Cymbeline arrest Posthumus, thinking him an enemy.
  - Several characters hold (or purport to hold) the rank of captain, including Fluellen, Gower, Jamy, Macmorris and Pistol.
  - Several characters are sea captains, including Antonio in Twelfth Night. See also Master.
- Capulet:
  - Capulet is Juliet's father in Romeo and Juliet.
  - Lady Capulet is Juliet's mother in Romeo and Juliet.
  - Old Capulet is a minor character – a kinsman of Capulet – in the party scene of Romeo and Juliet.
  - See also Juliet and Tybalt.
- Lord Caputius (hist) is an ambassador from the Holy Roman Emperor in Henry VIII.
- Cardinal:
  - Cardinal Bourchier (hist) delivers the little Duke of York from sanctuary, and into the hands of Richard and Buckingham, in Richard III.
  - Cardinal Campeius (hist) is the papal legate at the trial of Katherine, in Henry VIII.
  - Cardinal Pandulph (hist) is the Papal legate in King John. He incites the Dauphin against John, but later tries to placate him.
  - Cardinal Wolsey (hist) orchestrates the fall from grace of Buckingham and Katherine, but himself falls from grace and dies, in Henry VIII.
  - See also the Bishop of Winchester, who becomes a Cardinal in the course of Henry VI, Part 1.
- The Bishop of Carlisle (hist) supports Richard in Richard II.
- A carpenter and a cobbler are among the crowd of commoners gathered to welcome Caesar home enthusiastically in the opening scene of Julius Caesar.
- Casca (hist) is one of the conspirators against Caesar, in Julius Caesar. He has an important role in the early parts of the play, reporting offstage events.
- Cassandra (myth) is a prophetess in Troilus and Cressida.
- Michael Cassio is a lieutenant in Othello. Iago persuades Othello that Cassio is having an affair with Othello's wife, Desdemona.
- Caius Cassius (hist) is a central character in Julius Caesar. He incites the conspiracy against Caesar, and recruits Brutus to the conspirators' ranks.
- Catesby (hist) is a double agent – seemingly loyal to Lord Hastings but actually reporting to Buckingham and Richard – in Richard III.
- For Catherine see Katherine.
- Simon Catling, Hugh Rebeck and James Soundpost are minor characters, musicians, in Romeo and Juliet.
- Young Cato is a soldier of Brutus' and Cassius' party, in Julius Caesar.
- Celia is Rosalind's companion and cousin, and is daughter to Duke Frederick in As You Like It.
- Ceres (myth) is presented by a masquer in The Tempest.
- Cerimon is a lord of Ephesus in Pericles, Prince of Tyre. He opens the chest in which Thaisa had been buried at sea and, being skilled in medicine, he realises that she is not dead and nurses her back to health.
- For Cesario see Viola, who calls herself Cesario in her male disguise, and her brother Sebastian who is sometimes called Cesario, being mistaken for his sister.
- The Lord Chamberlain, in Henry VIII (hist & hist) is a conflation of two historical Lords Chamberlain, one of them Lord Sandys, who is also a character in the play.
- The Lord Chancellor (hist) – historically Sir Thomas More, although not identified as such in the play – is among the Privy Counsellors who accuse Cranmer in Henry VIII.
- Charles:
  - Charles is a wrestler, defeated by Orlando, in As You Like It.
  - The Dauphin, later King Charles VII of France (hist) leads the French forces, with Joan, in Henry VI, Part 1.
- Charmian (hist) is the main attendant to Cleopatra in Antony and Cleopatra and dies by snakebite.
- Emmanuel the Clerk of Chatham (fict) is murdered by Jack Cade's rebels in Henry VI, Part 2.
- Chatillion is an ambassador from France to England in King John.
- The Lord Chief Justice (hist) is a dramatic foil to Falstaff in Henry IV, Part 2.
- Chiron and Demetrius, are two sons of Tamora in Titus Andronicus. They rape and mutilate Lavinia, and are eventually killed and cooked by Titus, who serves them to Tamora to eat.
- Chorus:
  - The Chorus speaks the opening prologue in Romeo and Juliet, and a further prologue at the beginning of the second act.
  - The Chorus (fict) is the second most major character, after the king himself, in Henry V. He speaks a lengthy prologue to each of the five acts, and an epilogue.
  - See also John Gower, Rosalind, Rumour and Time, each of whom act as a chorus in their play.
  - See also Prologue.
- Christopher:
  - Christopher Sly is a drunken tinker in the induction to The Taming of the Shrew. He is gulled into believing he is a lord.
  - Christopher Urswick (hist) is a minor character: a priest acting as messenger for Lord Stanley, in Richard III.
- Cicero, a senator, hears Casca's account of strange portents, in Julius Caesar.
- Metellus Cimber (hist) is one of the conspirators in Julius Caesar.
- Cinna:
  - Cinna (hist) is one of the conspirators against Caesar in Julius Caesar.
  - Cinna is a poet, mistaken for the conspirator Cinna in Julius Caesar. Realising they have the wrong man, the mob "kill him for his bad verses".
- Citizen:
  - A citizen of Antium briefly meets the disguised Coriolanus, and directs him to Aufidius' house.
  - A mob of citizens, seven of them speaking roles, appear both in opposition and in support of the title character in several scenes of Coriolanus. Speaking as one, the mob's speech prefix is Plebeians.
  - Three citizens debate the succession of Edward V, in Richard III.
  - See also Plebeians.
- Clarence:
  - George, Duke of Clarence (hist) is the younger brother of Edward and the elder brother of Richard in Henry VI, part 3 and Richard III. He is often known as "perjured Clarence", having broken his oath to Warwick and fighting instead for his brother's faction. He is eventually drowned in a butt of malmesy wine.
  - Thomas, Duke of Clarence (hist) is Hal's younger brother, who appears in Henry IV, Part 2 and Henry V.
- Claudio:
  - Claudio is a friend to Benedick and a follower of Don Pedro, in Much Ado About Nothing. He falls in love with Hero but is persuaded, wrongly, that she has been unfaithful.
  - Claudio, brother to Isabella, is sentenced to death for fornication in Measure for Measure.
- Claudius:
  - Claudius and Varro are guards in Brutus' tent, in Julius Caesar. They do not see Caesar's ghost.
  - King Claudius (myth) is the uncle and stepfather of the title character in Hamlet. He has murdered his brother Old Hamlet, has taken over his crown, and has married his queen, Gertrude.
- Cleomines is a courtier to Leontes, who, with Dion delivers the oracle from Delphos in The Winter's Tale.
- Cleon is governor of Tarsus in Pericles, Prince of Tyre. Pericles brings food to save Cleon's starving people, and later trusts his new-born daughter into Cleon's care.
- Cleopatra (hist) is the lover of Antony in Antony and Cleopatra. She commits suicide using a poisonous asp.
- Emmanuel the Clerk of Chatham (fict) is murdered by Jack Cade's rebels in Henry VI, Part 2.
- Clifford:
  - Clifford (sometimes called Young Clifford) (hist) is a staunch Lancastrian, and is the Yorkists most hated enemy — as the killer of Rutland — in Henry VI, Part 2 and Henry VI, Part 3.
  - Old Clifford (hist), father of Clifford, is a Lancastrian leader in Henry VI, Part 2.
- Clitus is a soldier, a follower of Brutus, in Julius Caesar. He refuses to aid Brutus' suicide.
- Cloten, son of the Queen and stepson to the king in Cymbeline, vainly loves Imogen, and eventually resolves to rape her.
- Clown:
  - The Clown is the good-natured son of the Old Shepherd, gulled by Autolycus, in The Winter's Tale.
  - The Clown appears briefly to make fun of the musicians, and later to banter with Desdemona, in Othello.
  - The Clown delivers some pigeons, and letters from Titus Andronicus, to Saturninus. He is hanged for his pains.
  - The Clown delivers a poisonous asp to Cleopatra in a basket of figs, in Antony and Cleopatra.
  - The Clown, also identified as "Pompey" is a servant to Mistress Overdone in Measure for Measure.
  - For the two clowns in Hamlet see "Gravedigger".
  - For "Clown" in All's Well That Ends Well, see Lavatch.
  - See also Touchstone, who is simply called "Clown" until he reaches the Forest of Arden.
  - Numerous characters are clowns, or are comic characters originally played by the clowns in Shakespeare's company.
  - See also Fool and Shakespearian fool.
- A cobbler and a carpenter are among the crowd of commoners gathered to welcome Caesar home enthusiastically in the opening scene of Julius Caesar.
- Cobweb is a fairy in A Midsummer Night's Dream.
- Sir John Coleville is a rebel captured by Falstaff in Henry IV, Part 2.
- Cominius and Titus Lartius are leaders of the Roman forces against the Volscians, in Coriolanus.
- Conrade is a villain, a servant of Don John, in Much Ado About Nothing.
- "Three or four" Conspirators, three of them speaking roles, conspire with Aufidius, in Coriolanus.
- The Constable of France (hist) leads the French forces in Henry V.
- Constance (hist) is Arthur's mother in King John: a fierce advocate for her son's right to the English throne.
- Corambis is an alternative name for Polonius in Hamlet. He is so named in The First Quarto of Shakespeare's "Hamlet" (1603); occasionally referred to as the "bad quarto".
- Cordelia (myth) is the youngest daughter in King Lear. She marries the King of France. At the end of the play she is hanged on Edmund's instructions.
- Corin is a kindly shepherd in As You Like It.
- Caius Martius Coriolanus (hist) is the central character of Coriolanus, who earns the title "Coriolanus" in recognition of his skill at smiting Volscians in Coriolai.
- Cornelius:
  - Cornelius and Voltemand are two ambassadors from Claudius to the Norwegian court, in Hamlet.
  - Cornelius, a doctor in Cymbeline, provides a fake poison to the Queen, which is later used on Imogen. He also reports the Queen's last words.
- The Duke of Cornwall is Regan's husband, who puts out Gloucester's eyes, in King Lear.
- For Corporal, see Bardolph and Nym, who hold that rank.
- Costard is a clown and country bumkin from Love's Labour's Lost.
- Count (title):
  - A number of characters have the title Count, including Claudio (from Much Ado About Nothing) and Paris.
- Countess (title):
  - The Countess of Auvergne (hist) tries to entrap Talbot in Henry VI, Part 1.
  - The Countess of Rousillon is Bertram's mother, and Helena's protector, in All's Well That Ends Well.
  - See also Olivia.
- A number of countrymen, together with Gerald, provide Maying entertainment in The Two Noble Kinsmen. Four of them are speaking roles. Three of them are called Arcas, Rycas and Sennois. They may, or may not, include Timothy and the Bavian.
- Five countrywomen (called Barbary, Friz, Luce, Maudlin and Nell) dance at the Maying entertainment in The Two Noble Kinsmen.
- Alexander Court (fict) is a soldier in the English army in Henry V.
- Courtesan:
  - A courtesan dines with Antipholus of Ephesus, who finds himself locked out of his own home, in The Comedy of Errors.
  - Several characters are courtesans, or are accused of being courtesans, most notably Cressida from Troilus and Cressida.
- Crab is Launce's dog, in The Two Gentlemen of Verona.
- Thomas Cranmer, Archbishop of Canterbury (hist) is a major character in the last act of Henry VIII: hauled before the privy council by his enemies and threatened with imprisonment, but protected by the king.
- Cressida is one of the title characters in Troilus and Cressida. The Trojan prince Troilus falls in love with this young daughter of a Trojan defector.
- A crier to the court, and a scribe to the court, are minor roles – but they usually have dramatic impact – in the trial scene of Henry VIII.
- Thomas Cromwell (hist) is secretary to Wolsey, and later to the Privy Council, in Henry VIII.
- Cupid (myth) reads the prologue to a masque in Timon of Athens.
- Curan is minor character, a follower of the Earl of Gloucester, in King Lear.
- Curio is an attendant on Orsino in Twelfth Night.
- Curtis is a servant of Petruchio in The Taming of the Shrew.
- Cymbeline (hist), the title character of Cymbeline, is king of the Britons, and father to Imogen, Guiderus and Arviragus.

== D ==
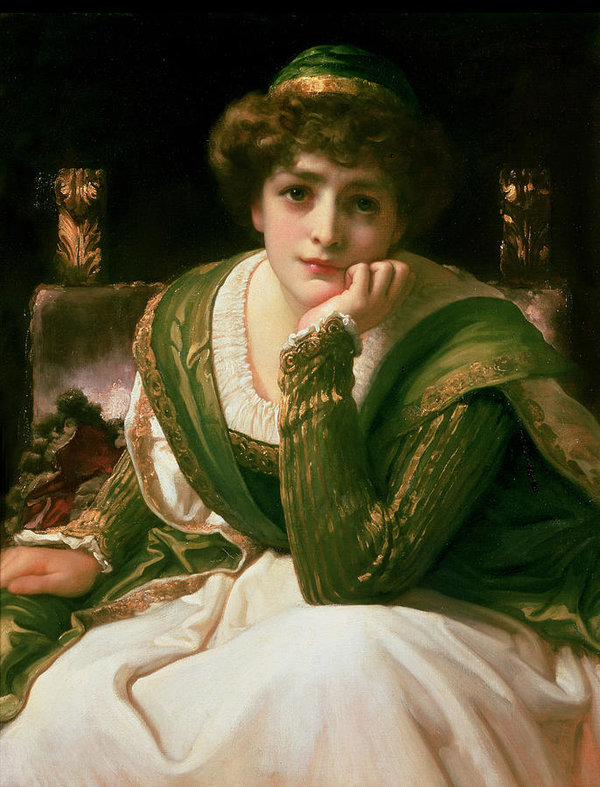
Desdemona by Frederic Leighton

- Dardanius is a soldier, a follower of Brutus, in Julius Caesar. He refuses to aid Brutus' suicide.
- Daughter:
  - The Daughter of Antiochus is a famed beauty, engaged in a secret incestuous relationship with her father, in Pericles, Prince of Tyre.
  - The Jailer's Daughter develops an obsessive love for Palamon, and releases him from prison, in The Two Noble Kinsmen. She descends into madness.
- Dauphin (sometimes Dolphin in older texts):
  - The Dauphin (hist) is Henry's chief enemy in Henry V.
  - The Dauphin, later King Charles VII of France (hist) leads the French forces, with Joan, in Henry VI, Part 1.
  - See also Lewis.
- Davy (fict) is justice Shallow's servant in Henry IV, Part 2.
- DeBoys:
  - Jaques DeBoys is a brother to Oliver and Orlando in As You Like It.
  - See also Oliver and Orlando from As You Like It, whose surname is also DeBoys.
- Decius Brutus (hist) is one of the conspirators against Caesar in Julius Caesar.
- For Decretas, see Dercetus.
- Deiphobus (myth), a brother of Hector and Troilus, is a minor character (with the one line, "It is the Lord Aeneas") in Troilus and Cressida.
- Demetrius:
  - Demetrius is in love with Hermia at the start of A Midsummer Night's Dream. Later, he loves and marries Helena.
  - Demetrius and Chiron, are two sons of Tamora in Titus Andronicus. They rape and mutilate Lavinia, and are eventually killed and cooked by Titus, who serves them to Tamora to eat.
  - Demetrius and Philo, Romans following Antony, regret his infatuation with Cleopatra in Antony and Cleopatra.
- Dennis is a minor character – a servant to Oliver – in As You Like It.
- Sir Anthony Denny (hist) is a minor character in Henry VIII, who brings Cranmer to the King.
- Lord Stanley, Earl of Derby (hist) is a military leader who ultimately reveals his loyalty to the Richmond faction, in spite of his son being a hostage to Richard, in Richard III.
- Dercetus (hist) is a follower of Antony in Antony and Cleopatra. He informs Caesar of Antony's death.
- Desdemona is the protagonist's wife in Othello. He strangles her, in the mistaken belief that she is unfaithful.
- Diana:
  - Diana is desired by Bertram, and pretends to agree to have sex with him. Instead, under cover of darkness, she exchanges places with Helena, who becomes pregnant with Bertram's child, in All's Well That Ends Well.
  - Diana (myth) the goddess of chastity, appears to Perciles in a vision, in Pericles, Prince of Tyre She tells him to visit her temple at Ephesus, leading to his reconciliation with Thaisa there.
- Dick:
  - Dick the Butcher (fict) is a follower of Jack Cade in Henry VI, Part 2.
  - See also Richard.
- Diomedes:
  - Diomedes is a follower of Cleopatra in Antony and Cleopatra. He informs Antony that Cleopatra is alive, and informs Cleopatra that Antony is dying.
  - Diomedes (myth) is one of the Greek leaders in Troilus and Cressida.
  - Diomedes' Servant is sent with a message to Cressida, in Troilus and Cressida.
- Dion is a courtier to Leontes, who, with Cleomines delivers the oracle from Delphos in The Winter's Tale.
- Dionyza, the wife of Cleon of Tarsus, is entrusted with the upbringing of Marina, in Pericles, Prince of Tyre. However, she comes to see Marina as a rival to her own daughter, and orders Leonine to kill Marina.
- Doctor (title):
  - A Doctor in Cordelia's train tends the mad Lear in King Lear.
  - A Doctor suggests that the wooer can cure the Jailer's Daughter's madness by having sex with her while pretending to be Palamon, in The Two Noble Kinsmen.
  - Doctor Butts (hist) is the king's physician in Henry VIII. He alerts the king to Cranmer's humiliation in refused admittance to the council chamber.
  - Doctor Caius (hist-ish) is a French doctor in The Merry Wives of Windsor. He challenges Parson Hugh to a duel.
  - An English Doctor is a minor character in Macbeth.
  - A Scottish Doctor witnesses Lady Macbeth sleepwalking in Macbeth.
  - See also Pinch in The Comedy of Errors, who is sometimes referred to as "Doctor Pinch".
- Dogberry, accompanied by Verges, is a clownish officer of the watch in Much Ado About Nothing.
- Dolabella (hist) is a follower of Caesar in Antony and Cleopatra. He tells Cleopatra that Caesar intends to lead her, in triumph, through Rome.
- Doll Tearsheet (fict) is a whore, who is emotionally involved with Falstaff, and is later arrested for murder in Henry IV, Part 2.
- For Dolphin see Dauphin.
- For Domitus see Enobarbus.
- Don (title):
  - Don John is the bastard brother of Don Pedro, and is the chief villain in Much Ado About Nothing.
  - Don Pedro is the prince of Arragon in Much Ado About Nothing.
  - Don Adriano de Armado is an arrogant Spanish braggart in Love's Labour's Lost.
- Donalbain (hist) is the second son of Duncan in Macbeth.
- A Door Keeper (fict) bars the entrance of Cranmer to the council chamber, in Henry VIII.
- Dorcas and Mopsa are shepherdesses, usually portrayed as rather tarty, in The Winter's Tale.
- Dorset (hist) and Grey (hist), are the two sons of Queen Elizabeth from her first marriage, who are arrested and executed on the orders of Buckingham and Richard in Richard III.
- The Earl of Douglas leads the Scottish rebel forces in Henry IV, Part 1.

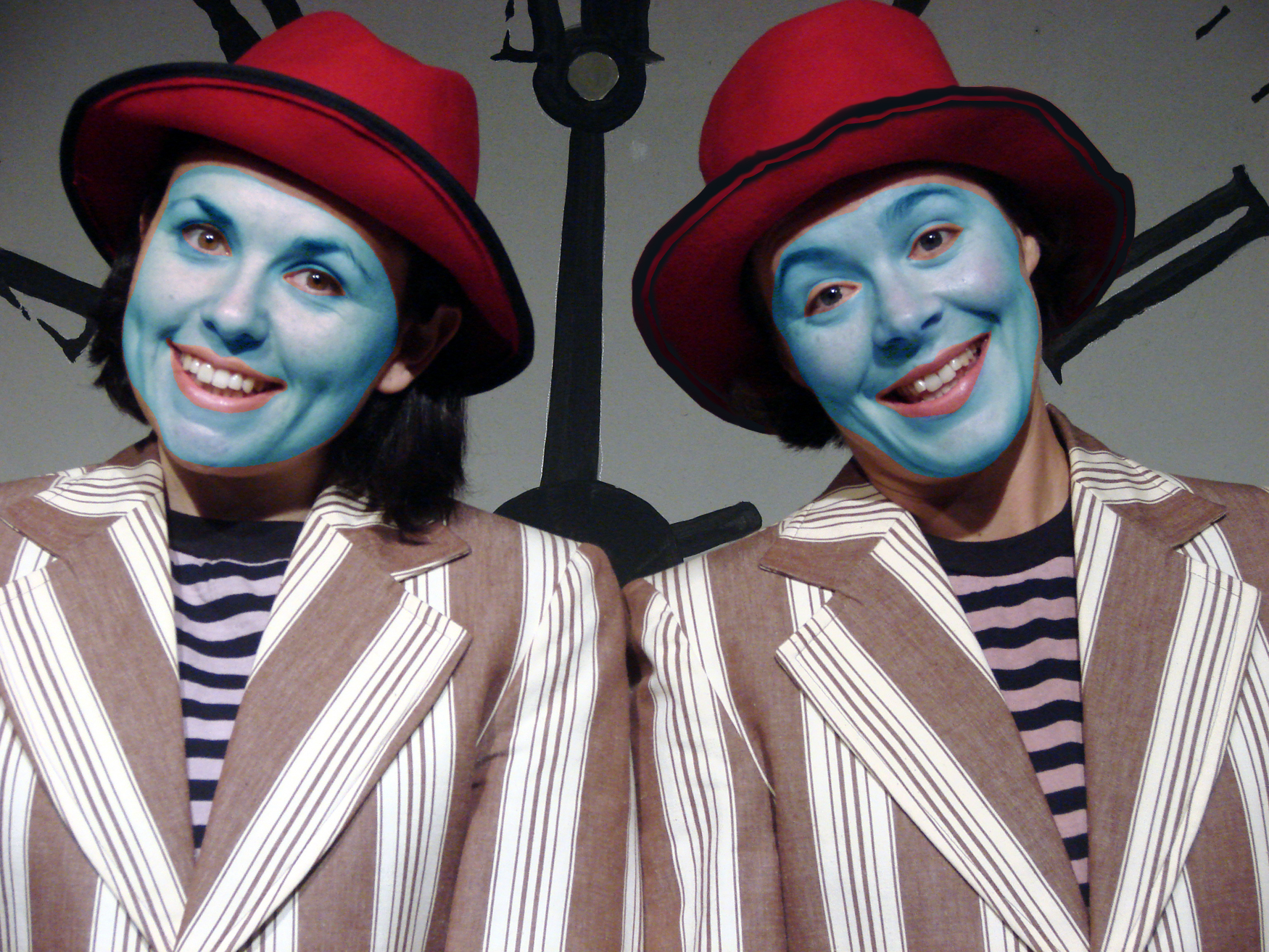
The twin Dromios in a Carmel Shake-speare Festival production at the Forest Theater in Carmel, California. September, 2008

- Dromio:
  - Dromio of Ephesus, servant to Antipholus of Ephesus and twin of Dromio of Syracuse – with whom he is often confused, is a central character in The Comedy of Errors.
  - Dromio of Syracuse, servant to Antipholus of Syracuse and twin of Dromio of Ephesus – with whom he is often confused, is a central character in The Comedy of Errors.
- Duchess (title):
  - Duchess of Gloucester:
    - The Duchess of Gloucester (hist) is the widow of Thomas of Woodstock, Duke of Gloucester. His murder (before the play opens) drives much of the action of Richard II.
    - Eleanor, Duchess of Gloucester (hist) is married to Humphrey, Duke of Gloucester in Henry VI, Part 2, in which she dabbles in witchcraft with disastrous results.
  - Duchess of York:
    - The Duchess of York (1) (unnamed) character in Richard II, a composite of Isabella of Castile, Duchess of York, died 1392, the mother of Aumerle, and Joan Holland, who bore no children
    - The Duchess of York (2) (hist) is married to Richard, Duke of York (1) in Henry VI, Part 3. She outlives him to mourn the death of two of their sons in Richard III.
- Duke (title):
  - The Duke of Albany is Goneril's husband in King Lear.
  - The Duke of Alençon (hist) is one of the French leaders in Henry VI, Part 1.
  - The Duke of Arragon is an unsuccessful suitor to Portia in The Merchant of Venice.
  - For Duke of Austria see Limoges.
  - For Duke of Bedford see Prince John of Lancaster.
  - The Duke of Berry (hist) is a French leader in Henry V.
  - The Duke of Bourbon (hist) fights on the French side in Henry V.
  - The Duke of Britain (hist) is a French leader in Henry V.
  - Duke of Buckingham:
    - The Duke of Buckingham (1) (hist) is a Lancastrian in Henry VI, Part 2. His death is reported in Henry VI, Part 3.
    - The Duke of Buckingham (2) (hist) is a Yorkist in Henry VI, Part 3, and is a co-conspirator with Richard – although he is eventually rejected, then murdered on Richard's orders – in Richard III.
    - The Duke of Buckingham (3) (hist), an enemy of Wolsey, falls from grace and is executed by Henry in Henry VIII.
  - Duke of Burgundy:
    - The Duke of Burgundy (1) (hist) brokers the peace treaty between the kings of France and England in the last act of Henry V.
    - The Duke of Burgundy (2) (hist) fights firstly in alliance with the English, and later in alliance with the French, in Henry VI, Part 1.
    - The Duke of Burgundy (3) refuses to marry Cordelia without a dowry, in King Lear.
  - Duke of Clarence:
    - George, Duke of Clarence (hist) is the younger brother of Edward and the elder brother of Richard in Henry VI, Part 3 and Richard III. He is often known as "perjured Clarence", having broken his oath to Warwick and fighting instead for his brother's faction. He is eventually drowned in a butt of malmesy wine.
    - Thomas, Duke of Clarence (hist) is Hal's younger brother, who appears in Henry IV, Part 2 and Henry V.
  - The Duke of Cornwall is Regan's husband, who puts out Gloucester's eyes, in King Lear.
  - Duke of Exeter:
    - The Duke of Exeter (1) (hist) is an uncle of Henry V. He acts as emissary to the French King in Henry V. He has a more choric role in Henry VI, Part 1.
    - The Duke of Exeter (2) (hist) is a Lancastrian leader in Henry VI, Part 3.
  - The Duke of Florence discusses the progress of the war with the two French Lords, the brothers Dumaine, in All's Well That Ends Well.
  - Duke Frederick is the villain (the usurper of Duke Senior) in As You Like It.
  - Duke of Gloucester:
    - Humphrey, Duke of Gloucester (hist) appears as a brother of Hal in Henry IV, Part 2 and Henry V. He is a much more important character as the protector in Henry VI, Part 1 and Henry VI, Part 2, in which he is murdered by his rivals.
    - Richard, Duke of Gloucester, later Richard III (hist), brave but evil, is the third son of Richard, Duke of York (1). He is a fairly minor character in Henry VI, Part 2, is more prominent in Henry VI, Part 3, and is the title character – and murderer of many other characters – in Richard III.
    - See also Earl of Gloucester.
  - Duke of Lancaster:
    - John of Gaunt, Duke of Lancaster (hist), uncle to King Richard and father to Bolingbroke, dies in Richard II, having delivered his famous "This sceptred isle..." speech.
    - See also Bolingbroke, son to John of Gaunt, who claims the dukedom of Lancaster on his father's death.
  - Duke of Milan
    - The Duke of Milan is patron to both Valentine and Proteus, and is the father of Silvia, in The Two Gentlemen of Verona.
    - See also Prospero and Antonio from The Tempest, who are dukes of Milan.
  - Duke of Norfolk:
    - The Duke of Norfolk (hist) is a supporter of the Yorkists in Henry VI, Part 3 and Richard III.
    - The Duke of Norfolk (hist & hist) is an associate of Buckingham in Henry VIII.
    - Thomas Mowbray, Duke of Norfolk (hist) is Bolingbroke's enemy, exiled by Richard, in Richard II.
  - The Duke of Orleans (hist) fights on the French side in Henry V.
  - Duke Senior is the father of Rosalind. He is the true duke, and has been usurped by his brother, Duke Frederick, at the start of As You Like It.
  - Duke of Somerset:
    - The Duke of Somerset (1) (hist) is a follower of King Henry in Henry VI, Part 1.
    - The Duke of Somerset (2) (hist) appears among the Lancastrian faction in Henry VI, Part 2. His head is carried onstage by Richard (later Richard III) in the opening scene of Henry VI, Part 3.
    - The Duke of Somerset (3) (hist and hist) is a conflation by Shakespeare of two historical Dukes of Somerset. He supports both factions at different stages of Henry VI, Part 3.
  - Duke of Suffolk:
    - The Duke of Suffolk (hist) is a courtier, cynical about the King's relationship with Anne Bullen, in Henry VIII.
    - The Duke of Suffolk (William de la Pole) (hist) is a manipulative character, loved by Queen Margaret, in Henry VI, Part 1 and Henry VI, Part 2.
  - The Duke of Surrey (hist) accuses Aumerle of plotting Woodstock's death in Richard II.
  - Duke of Venice:
    - The Duke of Venice tries the case between Shylock and Antonio in The Merchant of Venice.
    - The Duke of Venice hears Brabantio's complaint against Othello in Othello.
  - For Duke of Vienna see Vincentio in Measure for Measure.
  - Duke of York:
    - The Duke of York (1) (hist) is the uncle of both Richard and Bolingbroke in Richard II.
    - The Duke of York (2) (hist) is a minor character, the leader of the "vaward" in Henry V. (Historically this character is the same person as Aumerle.)
    - Richard, Duke of York (1) (hist) is a central character in Henry VI, Part 1, Henry VI, Part 2, and Henry VI, Part 3. He is the Yorkist claimant to the throne of England, in opposition to Henry VI, and he is eventually killed on the orders of Queen Margaret.
    - Richard, Duke of York (2) (hist) is the younger of the two princes in the tower, murdered on the orders of Richard in Richard III.
  - For The Duke in Measure for Measure, see Vincentio.
  - Numerous characters are Dukes, including Antonio (from The Tempest), Orsino, Prospero, Solinus, Theseus and Vincentio (from Measure for Measure).
- Dull is a constable in Love's Labour's Lost.
- Dumaine:
  - Dumaine (hist), with Berowne and Longaville, is one of the three companions of The King of Navarre in Love's Labour's Lost.
  - See also the two Lords in All's Well That Ends Well, who are described as the brothers Dumaine.
- Duncan (hist) is the king of Scotland, murdered in Macbeth.
- A Dutchman, a Frenchman and a Spaniard are guests of Philario, in Cymbeline.

== E ==
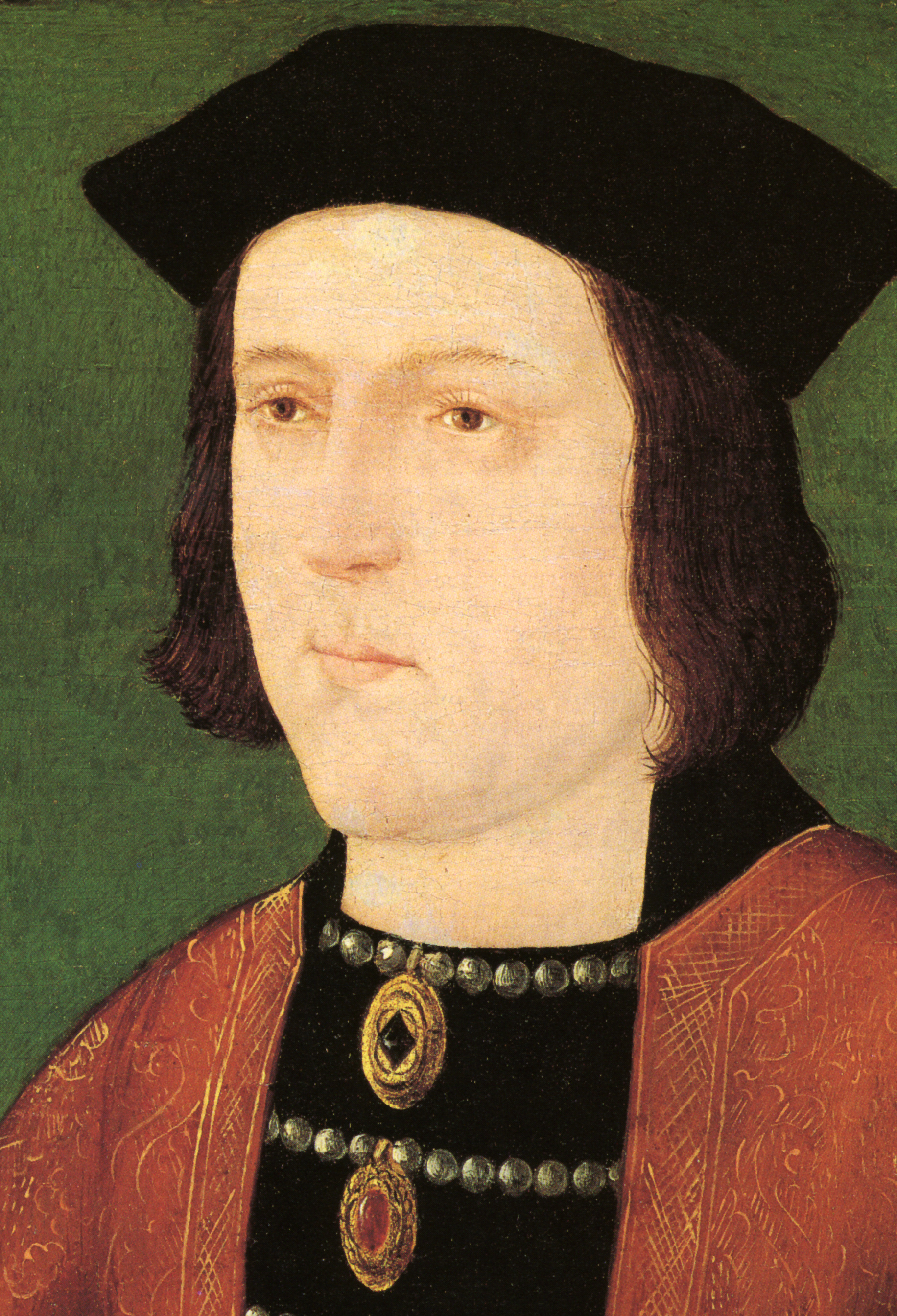
The historical Edward IV, a character in Shakespeare's Henry VI, Part 1, Henry VI, Part 2, and Richard III.

- Earl (title):
  - The Earl of Cambridge (hist) is one of the three conspirators against the king's life (with Scroop and Grey) in Henry V.
  - Lord Stanley, Earl of Derby (hist) is a military leader who ultimately reveals his loyalty to the Richmond faction, in spite of his son being a hostage to Richard, in Richard III.
  - The Earl of Douglas (hist) leads the Scottish rebel forces in Henry IV, Part 1.
  - The Earl of Essex (hist) is a minor character in King John.
  - The Earl of Gloucester is the father of Edgar and Edmund, who has his eyes put out by the Duke of Cornwall, in King Lear.
  - The Earl of Grandpre (hist), a French leader, makes an unduly optimistic speech on the morning of Agincourt, in Henry V.
  - The Earl of Huntingdon (hist) is a non-speaking follower of the king in Henry V.
  - The Earl of Kent in King Lear is a follower of Lear who evades banishment by disguising himself as a servant, and calling himself Caius.
  - Earl of Northumberland:
    - The Earl of Northumberland, Henry Percy, (hist) is an important character in Richard II, where he is Bolingbroke's chief ally, and in Henry IV, Part 1 and Henry IV, Part 2, in which he leads the rebellion against his former ally, who is now king.
    - The Earl of Northumberland (hist) fights for the Lancastrians in Henry VI, Part 3.
    - See also Seyward in Macbeth.
  - The Earl of Oxford (hist) is a staunch Lancastrian, supporting Henry in Henry VI, Part 3, and Richmond in Richard III.
  - Earl of Pembroke:
    - The Earl of Pembroke (hist), together with Salisbury and Bigot, fear for the life of young Arthur, and later discover his body, in King John.
    - The Earl of Pembroke (hist) is a non-speaking Yorkist in Henry VI, Part 3.
  - The Earl of Richmond, later King Henry VII (hist) leads the rebellion against the cruel rule of Richard III, and eventually succeeds him as king.
  - Earl Rivers (hist), is the brother to Queen Elizabeth in Richard III. He is arrested and executed on the orders of Richard and Buckingham.
  - Earl of Salisbury:
    - The Earl of Salisbury (hist) delivers bad news to Constance, in King John.
    - The Earl of Salisbury (hist) remains loyal to King Richard in Richard II.
    - The Earl of Salisbury (hist) fights for the king in Henry V. He is killed by the Master Gunner's Boy in Henry VI, Part 1.
    - The Earl of Salisbury (hist) supports the Yorkists in Henry VI, Part 2.
  - Earl of Surrey:
    - The Earl of Surrey (hist) is a supporter of the king in Henry IV, Part 2.
    - The Earl of Surrey (hist) is a son-in-law of Buckingham in Henry VIII.
  - Earl of Warwick:
    - The Earl of Warwick (1) (hist) is a supporter of the kings in Henry IV, Part 2 and Henry V.
    - The Earl of Warwick (2) (hist) is an important player in the Wars of the Roses, firstly for the Yorkist party, and then for the Lancastrians. He appears in Henry VI, Part 1, Henry VI, Part 2, and Henry VI, Part 3.
  - Earl of Westmoreland:
    - The Earl of Westmoreland (1) (hist) is one of the leaders of the royal forces in Henry IV, Part 1, Henry IV, Part 2, and Henry V.
    - The Earl of Westmoreland (2) (hist) fights for King Henry in Henry VI, Part 3.
  - The Earl of Worcester (hist) is the brother of the Earl of Northumberland, and a leader of the rebel forces, in Henry IV, Part 1.
- Edgar is the worthy, legitimate son of Gloucester in King Lear. He disguises himself as "Poor Tom".
- Edmund:
  - Edmund is the bastard son of Gloucester, and the most calculating of the villains, in King Lear.
  - Edmund Mortimer (1) (hist) is a claimant to the English throne, and a leader of the rebel forces, in Henry IV, Part 1.
  - Edmund Mortimer (2) (hist) explains the Yorkist claim to the crown to Richard Duke of York (1), in Henry VI, Part 1.

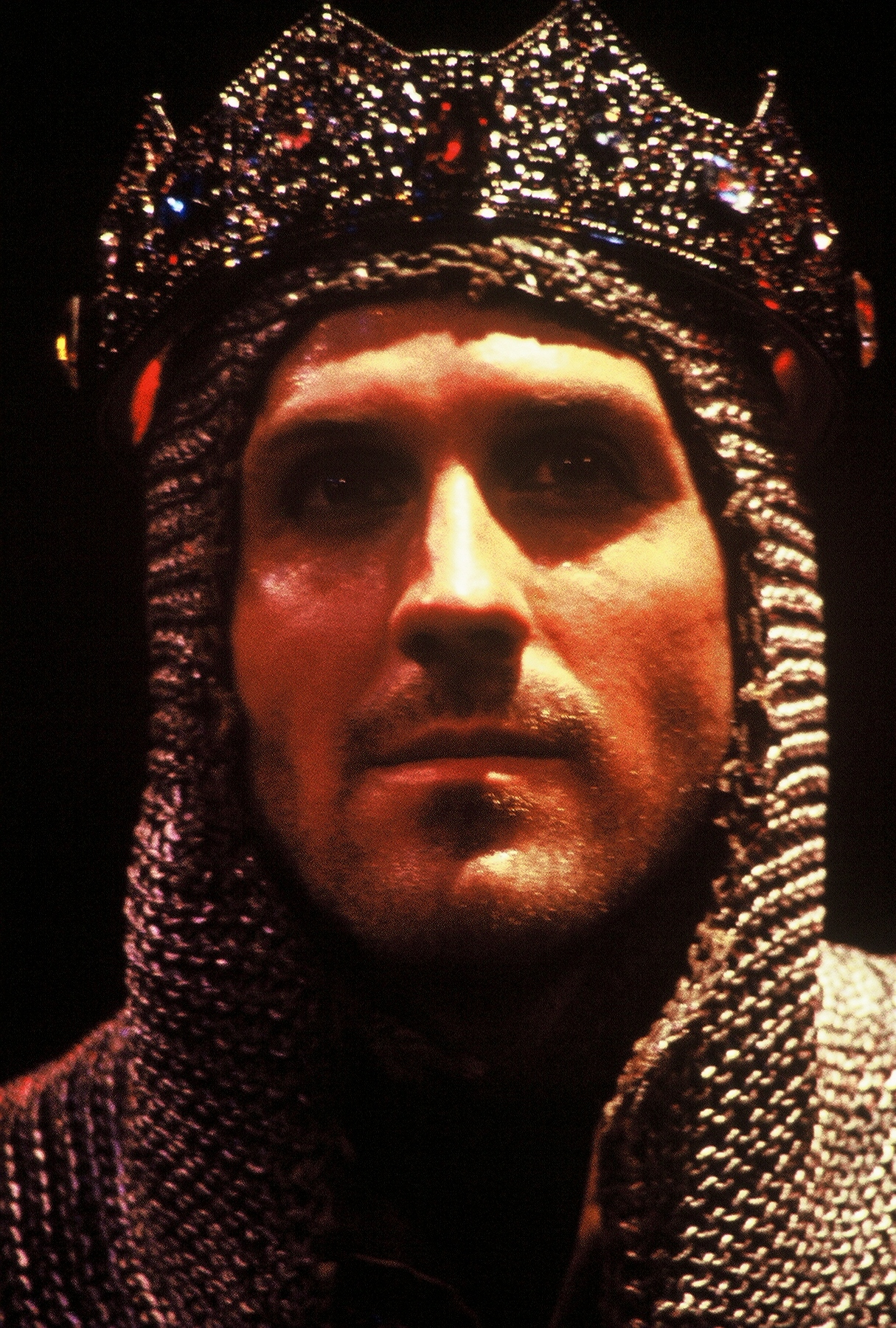
Edward IV (Travis Brazil), in a Carmel Shake-speare Festival production of Henry VI, Part 3, 2004

- Edward:
  - Edward later King Edward IV (hist) is the eldest son of Richard, Duke of York (1) in Henry VI, Part 2 and Henry VI, Part 3 – in which he becomes king. He dies in Richard III.
  - Prince Edward:
    - Prince Edward (hist) is the son of Henry VI, who joins his mother Queen Margaret as a leader of the Lancastrian forces in Henry VI, Part 3. He is killed by the three Yorks (Edward, George and Richard).
    - Prince Edward of York later King Edward V (hist) is the eldest son of Edward IV and Queen Elizabeth. He appears in Henry VI, Part 3, and is the elder of the two princes in the tower in Richard III.
  - See also Ned.
- Egeon is a merchant from Syracuse, father of the Antipholus twins in The Comedy of Errors. He is under Solinus's sentence of death unless he can pay a thousand marks' fine.
- Egeus (myth) is the father of Hermia in A Midsummer Night's Dream. He wishes to have her married, against her will, to Demetrius.
- Sir Eglamour assists Silvia's escape from her father's palace, in The Two Gentlemen of Verona.
- Elbow is a dim-witted constable in Measure for Measure.
- Eleanor:
  - Eleanor, Duchess of Gloucester (hist) is married to Humphrey, Duke of Gloucester in Henry VI, Part 2, in which she dabbles in witchcraft with disastrous results.
  - Queen Eleanor (hist) is the mother of John in King John. She takes a liking to Philip the Bastard, and recruits him to John's court.
  - Duchess of Gloucester (hist) is the widow of Thomas of Woodstock, Duke of Woodstock, and uncle to the King in Richard II. Her given name, Eleanor de Bohun, is not mentioned in the play.
- Queen Elizabeth (hist) is a suitor to, and then queen to, Edward IV in Henry VI, Part 3 and Richard III. She is a major character in the later play, and a foil to Richard.
- Ely:
  - The Bishop of Ely (1) (hist) conspires with the Archbishop of Canterbury in the opening scene of Henry V.
  - The Bishop of Ely (2) (hist) ultimately shows his opposition to Richard, in Richard III.
- Emilia:
  - Emilia is married to Iago in Othello. She steals Desdemona's handkerchief for Iago. At the end of the play – too late to save Desdemona – she realises Iago's villainy, and exposes him, but is then murdered by him.
  - Emilia is Hippolyta's sister in The Two Noble Kinsmen. Both title characters fall in love with her, leading to mortal conflict.
  - Emilia is a lady attending on Hermione, both at court and in prison, in The Winter's Tale.
  - See also Aemilia.
- For Emillius see Aemilius.
- Emmanuel the Clerk of Chatham (fict) is murdered by Jack Cade's rebels in Henry VI, Part 2.
- An English Doctor is a minor character in Macbeth.
- Enobarbus (hist & hist) is a major character in Antony and Cleopatra: a follower of Antony who later abandons him to join Caesar.
- Ephesus:
  - Antipholus of Ephesus, twin of Antipholus of Syracuse – with whom he is often confused, is a central character in The Comedy of Errors.
  - Dromio of Ephesus, servant to Antipholus of Ephesus and twin of Dromio of Syracuse – with whom he is often confused, is a central character in The Comedy of Errors.
  - See also Solinus, who is Duke of Ephesus.
- Epilogue:
  - An Epilogue and a Prologue (possibly the same player) appear in The Two Noble Kinsmen.
  - An Epilogue and a Prologue (possibly the same player) appear in Henry VIII.
  - An Epilogue (possibly the character Rumour) appears in Henry IV, Part 2.
  - A number of characters speak epilogues, including Chorus (in Henry V), Gower, Prospero and Rosalind.
  - See also Prologue and Chorus.
- Eros is a follower of Antony in Antony and Cleopatra, who kills himself rather than obey Antony's order to kill him.
- Sir Thomas Erpingham (hist) is an officer in the English army in Henry V.
- Escalus:
  - Escalus, Prince of Verona tries to keep the peace between Montague and Capulet, in Romeo and Juliet.
  - Escalus is a lord involved in the government of Vienna, in Measure for Measure.
- Escanes is a minor character in Pericles, Prince of Tyre. He converses with Helicanus about the strange death of Antiochus and his daughter.
- The Earl of Essex (hist) is a minor character in King John.
- Sir Hugh Evans is a Welsh priest in The Merry Wives of Windsor. He is challenged to a duel by Caius. He plays a fairy in the final act.
- Exeter:
  - The Duke of Exeter (1) (hist) is an uncle of Henry V. He acts as emissary to the French King in Henry V. He has a more choric role in Henry VI, Part 1.
  - The Duke of Exeter (2) (hist) is a Lancastrian leader in Henry VI, Part 3.
- Sir Piers of Exton (fict) murders the deposed King Richard in Richard II.

== F ==
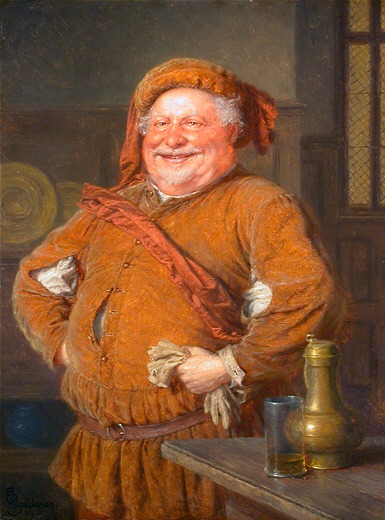
Falstaff by Eduard von Grützner

- Fabian is a servant to Olivia, and one of the conspirators against Malvolio, in Twelfth Night.
- A Fairy flirts with Puck in A Midsummer Night's Dream.
- Sir John Falstaff (fict, but see Sir John Oldcastle and Sir John Fastolfe) is a central character of Henry IV, Part 1, Henry IV, Part 2, and The Merry Wives of Windsor. In the Henry plays, he is "bad angel" to prince Hal, and is eventually rejected by him. He is the lecherous gull of the title characters in Merry Wives. His death is reported in Henry V, although he is not a character in that play. He is perhaps the most famous supporting role in all of Shakespeare.
- Fang is a constable in Henry IV, part 2.
- Sir John Fastolfe (hist) is a coward, stripped of his Garter in Henry VI, Part 1.
- A Father who has killed his son at the Battle of Towton appears in Henry VI, Part 3. See also Son.
- Faulconbridge:
  - Lady Faulconbridge (fict) confesses to her son, the Bastard, that Richard the Lionheart, and not her husband, was his true father, in King John.
  - Philip (the Bastard) Faulconbridge (fict) is a central character in King John, the bravest and most articulate of John's supporters.
  - Robert Faulconbridge (fict) is the legitimate brother of the bastard in King John. He inherits his father's property.
- Feeble is pressed into military service by Falstaff in Henry IV, Part 2.
- Fenton is a suitor to Anne Page in The Merry Wives of Windsor.
- Ferdinand:
  - Ferdinand is the only son of Alonzo (King of Naples) in The Tempest. Ferdinand falls in love with Miranda, and his love is tested by Prospero.
  - See also King of Navarre, whose first name is Ferdinand.
- Feste is the clown and musician in Twelfth Night: a foil for Malvolio.
- For Fidele see Imogen, who calls herself Fidele when disguised as a boy.
- For "First...", see entries under the rest of the character's designation (e.g. Murderer for First Murderer, Player for First Player, etc.).
- Three Fishermen befriend the shipwrecked Pericles, at Pentapolis, in Pericles, Prince of Tyre.
- Lord Fitzwalter (hist) is among those who challenge Aumerle in Richard II.
- Flaminius is a servant of Timon, sent – unsuccessfully – to seek money for his master from Lucullus, in Timon of Athens.
- Flavius:
  - Flavius is the loyal steward to Timon in Timon of Athens, who tries – and fails – to prevent his master's collapse into poverty.
  - Flavius and Marullus are tribunes of the people, dismayed by the enthusiasm of the commoners for the return of Caesar, in the opening scene of Julius Caesar.
- Fleance is the son of Banquo in Macbeth. He escapes when his father is murdered.
- The Duke of Florence discusses the progress of the war with the two French Lords, the brothers Dumaine, in All's Well That Ends Well.
- Florizel is the son of Polixines, and therefore prince of Bohemia, in The Winter's Tale. He elopes with Perdita when his father prevents their marriage.
- Fluellen (fict) is a Welsh captain in Henry V.
- Francis Flute is a bellows-mender in A Midsummer Night's Dream. He plays Thisbe in Pyramus and Thisbe.
- The Fool is a recurring (though not continuous) character throughout the canon (see: Shakespearian fool):
  - The Fool serves as a foil for the King in King Lear.
  - A Fool appears briefly in Timon of Athens.
  - See also Feste, Touchstone.
  - See also Clown.
- Ford:
  - Master Ford is a central character in The Merry Wives of Windsor. He suspects his wife of infidelity with Sir John Falstaff. He tests Falstaff in disguise, calling himself Master Brook.
  - Mistress Ford, Alice, wife of Master Ford, is a title character of The Merry Wives of Windsor. She pretends to accept Falstaff's overtures of love to her.
- A Forester, a minor character, accompanies the Princess and her ladies in waiting on a shooting expedition in Love's Labour's Lost.
- Fortinbras is a prince of Norway in Hamlet. He is a peripheral figure throughout the play, but arrives to take over the throne of Denmark after the death of the Danish royal family in the final act.
- France:
  - The Constable of France (hist) leads the French forces in Henry V.
  - The Dauphin, later King Charles VII of France (hist) leads the French forces, with Joan, in Henry VI, Part 1.
  - King of France:
    - The King of France (myth) is the husband of Cordelia in King Lear.
    - The King of France is cured by Helena, and in recompense he agrees to order Bertram to marry her, in All's Well That Ends Well.
    - The King of France (hist) is Henry V's enemy in Henry V.
    - King Lewis XI of France (hist), insulted by Edward IV's marriage to Lady Grey, allies himself with Warwick and Margaret in Henry VI, Part 3.
    - King Philip of France (hist) allies himself with Constance in support of Arthur's claim, but later makes peace with John in King John.
  - The Princess of France (hist) leads a diplomatic mission to Navarre and becomes romantically entangled with the King, in Love's Labour's Lost.
  - The Queen of France (hist) appears in the last act of Henry V.
- Francis:
  - Francis is a confused drawer in Henry IV, Part 1 and Henry IV, Part 2.
  - Francis Flute is a bellows-mender in A Midsummer Night's Dream. He plays Thisbe in Pyramus and Thisbe.
  - Friar Francis presides at the aborted marriage ceremony for Hero and Claudio, in Much Ado About Nothing.
- Francisca is a nun, senior to Isabella, in Measure for Measure.
- Francisco:
  - Francisco is a soldier on watch at Elsinore, who appears briefly in the opening moments of Hamlet.
  - Francisco is a lord, a follower of Alonso, in The Tempest.
- For Frank see Master Ford, whose first name is Frank.
- Duke Frederick is the villain (the usurper of Duke Senior) in As You Like It.
- A Frenchman, a Dutchman and a Spaniard are guests of Philario, in Cymbeline.
- Friar (title):
  - Friar Francis presides at the aborted marriage ceremony for Hero and Claudio, in Much Ado About Nothing.
  - Friar John is a minor character, who is unable to deliver a crucial letter from Friar Laurence to Romeo, in Romeo and Juliet.
  - Friar Laurence is confessor and confidant to Romeo in Romeo and Juliet. He instigates the unsuccessful plot involving the potion drunk by Juliet.
  - Friar Peter assists Isabella and Mariana in the final act of Measure for Measure.
  - Friar Thomas leads an order of friars, and assists Vincentio to disguise himself as a friar, in Measure for Measure.
  - For The Friar or Friar Lodowick in Measure for Measure, see Vincentio.
- Two Friends of the Jailer bring him news of his pardon, in The Two Noble Kinsmen.
- For Friz, see Countrywomen.
- Froth is a foolish gentleman, among those arrested and brought before Angelo by Elbow, in Measure for Measure.

== G ==
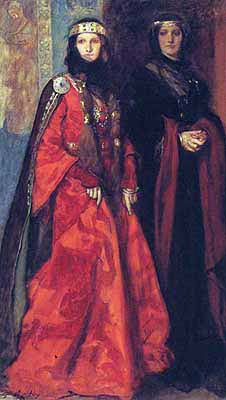
Goneril and Regan by Edwin Austin Abbey

- Gadshill (fict) is the "setter" of the Gadshill robbery in Henry IV, Part 1.
- For Gaius see Caius.
- Gallus (hist) is a follower of Caesar in Antony and Cleopatra.
- For Ganymede see Rosalind.
- Gaoler:
  - A Gaoler has custody of Egeon in The Comedy of Errors.
  - Several Gaolers, one a speaking role, guard Mortimer in Henry VI, Part 1.
  - See also Jailer.
- Gardener:
  - A gardener (with his men) encounters the Queen in Richard II.
  - Two gardener's men, with the gardener, encounter the Queen in Richard II.
- Gardiner:
  - Gardiner (hist) is the King's secretary, later Bishop of Winchester, and Cranmer's chief enemy, in Henry VIII.
  - Gardiner's Page is a minor role in Henry VIII.
- Gargrave (hist) fights for the English in France in Henry VI, Part 1.
- The Host of the Garter is the practical-joking innkeeper in The Merry Wives of Windsor.
- John of Gaunt, Duke of Lancaster (hist), uncle to King Richard and father to Bolingbroke, dies in Richard II, having delivered his famous "This sceptred isle..." speech.
- Gentleman:
  - A gentleman discusses the plight of mad Ophelia with Horatio in Hamlet.
  - A gentleman agrees to present Helena's petition to the King of France, in the last act of All's Well That Ends Well.
  - A gentleman reports the arrival of knights to battle for the love of Emilia, in The Two Noble Kinsmen.
  - Two gentlemen (fict) are ransomed for a thousand crowns each in Henry VI, Part 2.
  - Two gentlemen open the action of Cymbeline, explaining the backstory.
  - Two gentlemen of Ephesus witness Cerimon's discovery of Thaisa, in Pericles, Prince of Tyre.
  - Two gentlemen of Mytilene are converted from lives of debauchery by Marina's preaching, in Pericles, Prince of Tyre.
  - Two gentlemen (fict) are mid-sized roles in Henry VIII. Their conversations perform a choric function at the execution of Buckingham and (together with a third gentleman) at the coronation of Anne Bullen.
  - "Two or three" gentlemen of Tyre, one a speaking role, appear in the shipboard reconciliation scene between Pericles and Marina in Pericles, Prince of Tyre.
  - Four gentlemen, with Montano, witness the dispersal of the Turkish fleet and Othello's arrival at Cyprus in Othello.
  - A number of gentlemen (possibly three, although it impossible to know for certain how Shakespeare intended them to be doubled) are speaking roles in King Lear.
- Gentlewoman:
  - A Gentlewoman attending on Lady Macbeth witnesses her sleepwalking, with the Scottish Doctor, in Macbeth.
  - A Gentlewoman attends on Virgilia, in Coriolanus
- George:
  - George (fict) is a follower of Jack Cade in Henry VI, Part 2.
  - George, Duke of Clarence (hist) is the younger brother of Edward and the elder brother of Richard in Henry VI, Part 3 and Richard III. He is often known as "purjured Clarence", having broken his oath to Warwick and fighting instead for his brother's faction. He is eventually drowned in a butt of malmesy wine.
  - George Seacoal is a member of the Watch in Much Ado About Nothing.
  - See also Master Page, whose first name is George.
- Gerald is a pedantic schoolmaster, who leads the Maying entertainments in The Two Noble Kinsmen.
- Queen Gertrude is the protagonist's mother in Hamlet. She has married Claudius.
- Ghost. The following characters appear as Ghosts. See the entries under their character name:
  - Banquo
  - Julius Caesar
  - Old Hamlet
  - in Cymbeline:
    - Sicilius Leonantus
    - The Mother of Posthumus
    - Two brothers of Posthumus
  - and in Richard III:
    - Dorset
    - The Duke of Buckingham (2)
    - Earl Rivers
    - George, Duke of Clarence
    - Grey
    - Henry VI
    - Lady Anne
    - Lord Hastings
    - Prince Edward
    - Prince Edward of York
    - Richard Duke of York (2)
  - Antigonus in The Winter's Tale reports seeing the ghost of Hermione in a dream.
  - For "Ghost characters" in the other sense – characters mentioned in stage directions but having no lines and playing no part in the action – see Ghost character. Ghost characters in that sense are not listed on this page.
- Girl (hist) in Richard III is the young daughter of the murdered Clarence.
- Glansdale (fict) fights for the English in France in Henry VI, Part 1.
- Owen Glendower (hist), a warrior and magician who tries the patience of Hotspur, leads the Welsh forces in the rebellion in Henry IV, Part 1.
- Gloucester:
  - The Duchess of Gloucester (hist) is the widow of Thomas of Woodstock, Duke of Gloucester. His murder (before the play opens) drives much of the action of Richard II.
  - The Earl of Gloucester is the father of Edgar and Edmund, who has his eyes put out by the Duke of Cornwall, in King Lear.
  - Eleanor, Duchess of Gloucester (hist) is married to Humphrey, Duke of Gloucester in Henry VI, Part 2, in which she dabbles in witchcraft with disastrous results.
  - Humphrey, Duke of Gloucester (hist) appears as a brother of Hal in Henry IV, Part 2 and Henry V. He is a much more important character as the protector in Henry VI, Part 1 and Henry VI, Part 2, in which he is murdered by his rivals.
  - Richard, Duke of Gloucester, later Richard III (hist), brave but evil, is the third son of Richard, Duke of York (1). He is a fairly minor character in Henry VI, Part 2, is more prominent in Henry VI, Part 3, and is the title character – and murderer of many other characters – in Richard III.
- Gobbo:
  - Launcelot Gobbo is a clown in The Merchant of Venice, a servant to Shylock, and later to Lorenzo.
  - Old Gobbo, the blind old father of Launcelot Gobbo, is a clown in The Merchant of Venice.
- Goneril is the cruel eldest daughter in King Lear. She is married to the Duke of Albany.
- Gonzalo is a courtier to Alonzo in The Tempest.
- For Robin Goodfellow see Puck.
- Matthew Gough (hist) is an enemy of Jack Cade's rebels in Henry VI, Part 2.
- Governor:
  - The Governor of Harfleur (hist) surrenders to Henry V.
  - The Governor of Paris has an oath of allegiance administered to him by Gloucester (but has no lines of his own) in Henry VI, Part 1.
- Gower:
  - Gower (fict) is a messenger to the Lord Chief Justice in Henry IV, Part 2.
  - Gower (fict) is an English captain in Henry V.
  - John Gower (hist) is the "Presenter", or narrator, of Pericles, Prince of Tyre.
- The Earl of Grandpre (hist), a French leader, makes an unduly optimistic speech on the morning of Agincourt, in Henry V.
- Gratiano:
  - Gratiano is a hot-headed friend of Antonio and Bassanio in The Merchant of Venice. He marries Narissa.
  - Gratiano is Brabantio's brother in Othello.
- Gravedigger. The First Gravedigger and the Second Gravedigger are clowns in Hamlet. Hamlet's conversation with the First Gravedigger over Yorick's skull is possibly the most famous scene in Shakespeare.
- Green (hist) is a favourite of Richard in Richard II.
- Gregory and Sampson, two men of the Capulet household, open the main action of Romeo and Juliet with their aggressive and lecherous banter.
- Gremio is an elderly suitor to Bianca in The Taming of the Shrew.
- Grey:
  - Grey (hist) and Dorset (hist) are the two sons of Queen Elizabeth from her first marriage, who are arrested and executed on the orders of Buckingham and Richard in Richard III.
  - Sir Thomas Grey (hist) is one of the three conspirators against the king's life (with Cambridge and Scroop) in Henry V.
  - For Lady Grey see Queen Elizabeth.
- Griffith (hist) is a gentleman usher to Katherine, in Henry VIII.
- A groom of the King's stable (fict) visits the imprisoned Richard at Pontefract in Richard II.
- Grumio is a servant to Petruchio in The Taming of the Shrew.
- Guard/Guardsman:
  - Several Guards (two of them minor speaking roles), together with Dercetus, discover the mortally wounded Antony in Antony and Cleopatra.
  - Two Guards (or Guardsmen) assigned to keep a suicide watch over Cleopatra, in Antony and Cleopatra.
- Guiderius (also known as Polydore) is the true heir of the kingdom in Cymbeline, stolen away in infancy by Morgan, and brought up as Morgan's child.
- Guildenstern and Rosencrantz, in Hamlet, are two former friends of the prince, invited to the Danish court to spy on him. They eventually accompany Hamlet towards England, but he escapes while they continue with the journey, to their deaths.
- Sir Henry Guildford (hist) welcomes guests to Cardinal Wolsey's party, in Henry VIII.
- Gunner:
  - The Master Gunner of Orleans leaves his boy in charge of the artillery, in Henry VI, Part 1.
  - The Master Gunner's Boy kills Salisbury, in Henry VI, Part 1.
- James Gurney (fict) is a servant of Lady Faulconbridge, in King John.

== H ==
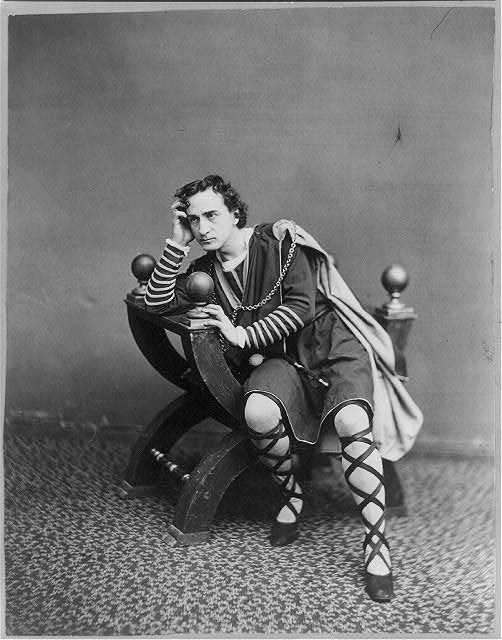
Edwin Booth (1833–1894), as Hamlet, c. 1870. Booth is in the position on the throne where he is said to have begun the monologue: To be or not to be, that is the question. (Hamlet, Act III, Scene 1, line 64).

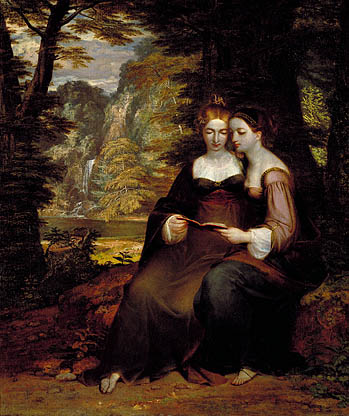
Washington Allston's 1818 painting Hermia and Helena

- A Haberdasher is verbally abused by Petruchio in The Taming of the Shrew.
- Hal, later King Henry V (sometimes called The Prince of Wales, Prince Henry or just Harry) (hist) is a central character in Henry IV, Part 1 and Henry IV, Part 2 and is the title character of Henry V. He has a closer relationship with Falstaff than with his father (Henry IV), but he eventually ascends the throne, rejects Falstaff, and leads the English to victory at Agincourt.
- Hamlet:
  - Prince Hamlet (myth) is the central character of Hamlet. He is a prince of Denmark, called on to avenge his father's (Old Hamlet's) murder by Claudius.
  - Old Hamlet (myth) is the father of the protagonist in Hamlet. His ghost appears to exhort Hamlet to revenge Old Hamlet's murder by Claudius.
- Harcourt is a messenger to the king in Henry IV, Part 2.
- The Governor of Harfleur (hist) surrenders to Henry in Henry V.
- Harry:
  - Hotspur or Harry Percy (hist), brave and chivalrous but hot-headed and sometimes comical, is an important foil to Hal, and leader of the rebel forces, in Henry IV, Part 1.
  - See also Hal, Bolingbroke.
  - See also "Henry".
- Hastings:
  - Hastings Pursuivant is a minor character who meets his namesake, Lord Hastings, in Richard III.
  - Lord Hastings (hist) is the prime minister, beheaded on Richard's orders in Richard III.
- For Hecat see Hecate.
- Hecate is a leader of the witches in Macbeth.
- Hector (myth), son of Priam, is the Trojans' champion in Troilus and Cressida.
- Helen:
  - Helen (myth), the mythological Helen of Troy, has been stolen away by Paris, and is thefore the cause of the wars fought in Troilus and Cressida.
  - Helen is a lady attending on Imogen in Cymbeline.
  - See also Nell.
  - See also Helena.
- Helena:
  - Helena, the ward of the Countess of Rousillon, is the central character of All's Well That Ends Well. She is married to Bertram against his will, but she eventually wins his love.
  - Helena, formerly loved by Demetrius, has been rejected by him at the start of A Midsummer Night's Dream.
- Helenus (myth) is a priest, and brother of Hector and Troilus. He is a minor character in Troilus and Cressida.
- Helicanus is a lord in Pericles, trusted with the government of Tyre during Pericles' absences.
- Henry:
  - Bolingbroke, later King Henry IV (hist) leads a revolt against King Richard in Richard II. He is the title character of Henry IV, Part 1 and Henry IV, Part 2, which chart the rebellions against him by the Percy faction, and his difficult relationship with his eldest son, Hal.
  - Hal, later King Henry V (sometimes called The Prince of Wales, Prince Henry or just Harry) (hist) is a central character in Henry IV, Part 1 and Henry IV, Part 2 and is the title character of Henry V.

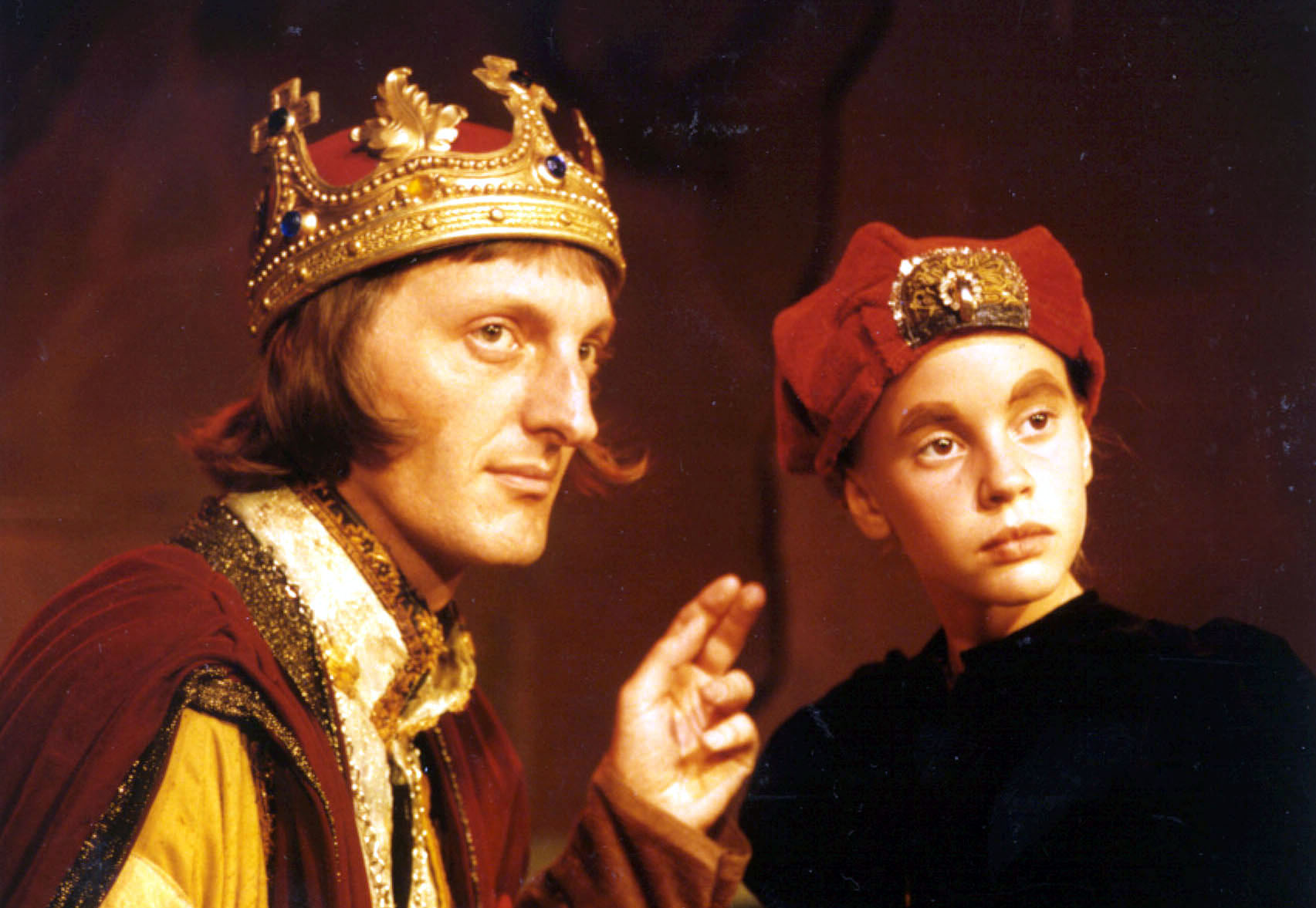
Henry VI (Jeffrey T. Heyer) and the young Earl of Richmond (Ashley Rose Miller) in the West Coast premiere of The Plantagenets: The Rise of Edward IV, based on Henry VI, Part 3, staged by Pacific Repertory Theatre in 1993.

  - King Henry VI (hist), the title character of Henry VI, Part 1, Henry VI, Part 2, and Henry VI, Part 3, is a weak and ineffectual king, and the plays chart the rebellions against him, leading to his overthrow and murder.
  - The Earl of Richmond, later King Henry VII (hist) leads the rebellion against the cruel rule of Richard III, and eventually succeeds him as king.
  - King Henry VIII (hist) is the central character of the play Henry VIII, portrayed as a wise and strong ruler.
  - The Earl of Northumberland, Henry Percy, (hist) is an important character in Richard II, where he is Bolingbroke's chief ally, and in Henry IV, Part 1 and Henry IV, Part 2, in which he leads the rebellion against his former ally, who is now king.
  - Prince Henry (hist) appears towards the end of King John, as successor to the title character.
  - Sir Henry Guildford (hist) welcomes guests to Cardinal Wolsey's party, in Henry VIII.
  - See also Hotspur (whose real name is Henry Percy).
  - See also "Harry"
- Herald:
  - A Herald calls for a champion to face Edmund in King Lear.
  - A Herald brings news to Theseus of noble prisoners taken in battle, including the title characters of The Two Noble Kinsmen.
  - A Herald announces victory celebrations in Othello.
  - A Herald announces Coriolanus' return to Rome in Coriolanus.
  - Two Heralds one French, one English, claim victory before the walls of Angers in King John. Neither of them persuades Hubert.
- Sir Walter Herbert is a follower of Richmond in Richard III.
- Hermia loves Lysander, and is loved by Demetrius, at the start of A Midsummer Night's Dream.
- Hermione is married to Leontes in The Winter's Tale. She suffers as a result of his mistaken belief in her infidelity. At the end of the play she appears to return from the dead, having appeared as a statue.
- Hero falls in love with Claudio in Much Ado About Nothing. She is wronged by Don John and Borachio, and is abandoned at the altar, and left for dead, by Claudio.
- Hippolyta (myth) is a leader of the Amazons, who is the bride of Theseus in A Midsummer Night's Dream and The Two Noble Kinsmen.
- Holofernes is a pedantic schoolmaster in Love's Labour's Lost. He plays Judas Maccabeus in the Pageant of the Nine Worthies.
- Horatio is a student, and a friend and confidant of the protagonist in Hamlet.
- Thomas Horner (fict) fights a duel with his apprentice Peter Thump in Henry VI, Part 2.
- Hortensio is a friend to Petruchio and suitor to Bianca in The Taming of the Shrew. He disguises himself as a music teacher in order to pursue Bianca, but ultimately loses her and marries a rich widow.
- Hortensius is a servant, sent to extract payment of a debt from Timon in Timon of Athens.
- Host:
  - The Host of the Garter is the practical-joking innkeeper in The Merry Wives of Windsor.
  - The Host of Julia's lodgings brings the disguised Julia into Proteus' company, in The Two Gentlemen of Verona.
- Hostess:
  - The Hostess of an alehouse throws out the unruly Sly, amidst an argument about broken glasses in the induction to The Taming of the Shrew.
  - See also Mistress Quickly, who is often referred to as "hostess".
- For Hostilius in Timon of Athens, see Strangers.
- Hotspur or Harry Percy (hist), brave and chivalrous but hot-headed and sometimes comical, is an important foil to Hal, and leader of the rebel forces, in Henry IV, Part 1.
- Hubert (hist) is a henchman of the king in King John. He resolves to put out Arthur's eyes, on John's orders, but eventually relents.
- Hugh:
  - Hugh Oatcake is a member of the Watch in Much Ado About Nothing.
  - Hugh Rebeck, Simon Catling and James Soundpost are minor characters, musicians, in Romeo and Juliet.
  - Sir Hugh Evans is a Welsh priest in The Merry Wives of Windsor. He is challenged to a duel by Caius. He plays a fairy in the final act.
  - Sir Hugh Mortimer (hist) is an uncle of Richard Duke of York (1) in Henry VI, Part 3.
- Hume, with Southwell, Jourdain and Bolingbroke, are the supernatural conspirators with Eleanor Duchess of Gloucester in Henry VI, Part 2.
- Humphrey, Duke of Gloucester (hist) appears as a brother of Hal in Henry IV, Part 2 and Henry V. He is a much more important character as the protector in Henry VI, Part 1 and Henry VI, Part 2, in which he is murdered by his rivals.
- The Earl of Huntingdon (hist) is a non-speaking follower of the king in Henry V.
- Several Huntsmen, two of whom are speaking roles, accompany the Lord in the induction to The Taming of the Shrew.
- Hymen (myth), the Greek god of marriage, is a character in As You Like It, and is a non-speaking role in the opening scene of The Two Noble Kinsmen.

== I ==
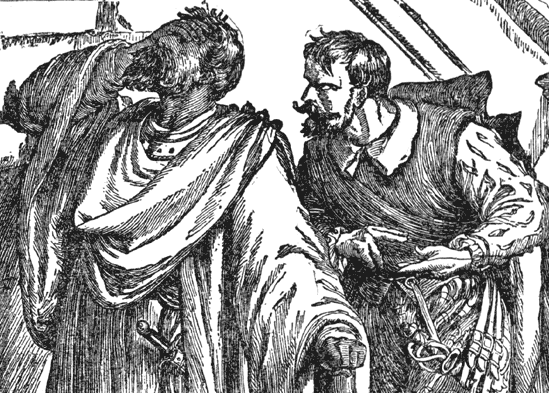
Iago and Othello in an illustration from Charles and Mary Lamb's Tales from Shakespeare.

- For Iachimo see Jachimo.
- Iago is the villain (and the main character, measured by the number of lines spoken) of Othello.
- Alexander Iden (hist) kills Jack Cade in Henry VI, Part 2.
- Imogen is the daughter of the king in Cymbeline. Her husband, Posthumus, wrongly believes she has been unfaithful and orders her killed.
- Iras is an attendant on Cleopatra, in Antony and Cleopatra. She dies following a kiss from Cleopatra.
- Iris (myth) is depicted by a masquer in The Tempest.
- Isabella (sometimes addressed as Isabel) is the virtuous central female character in Measure for Measure: a novice nun who pleads to Angelo for the life of her brother Claudio.
- For Isidore's Servant, see servant.

== J ==
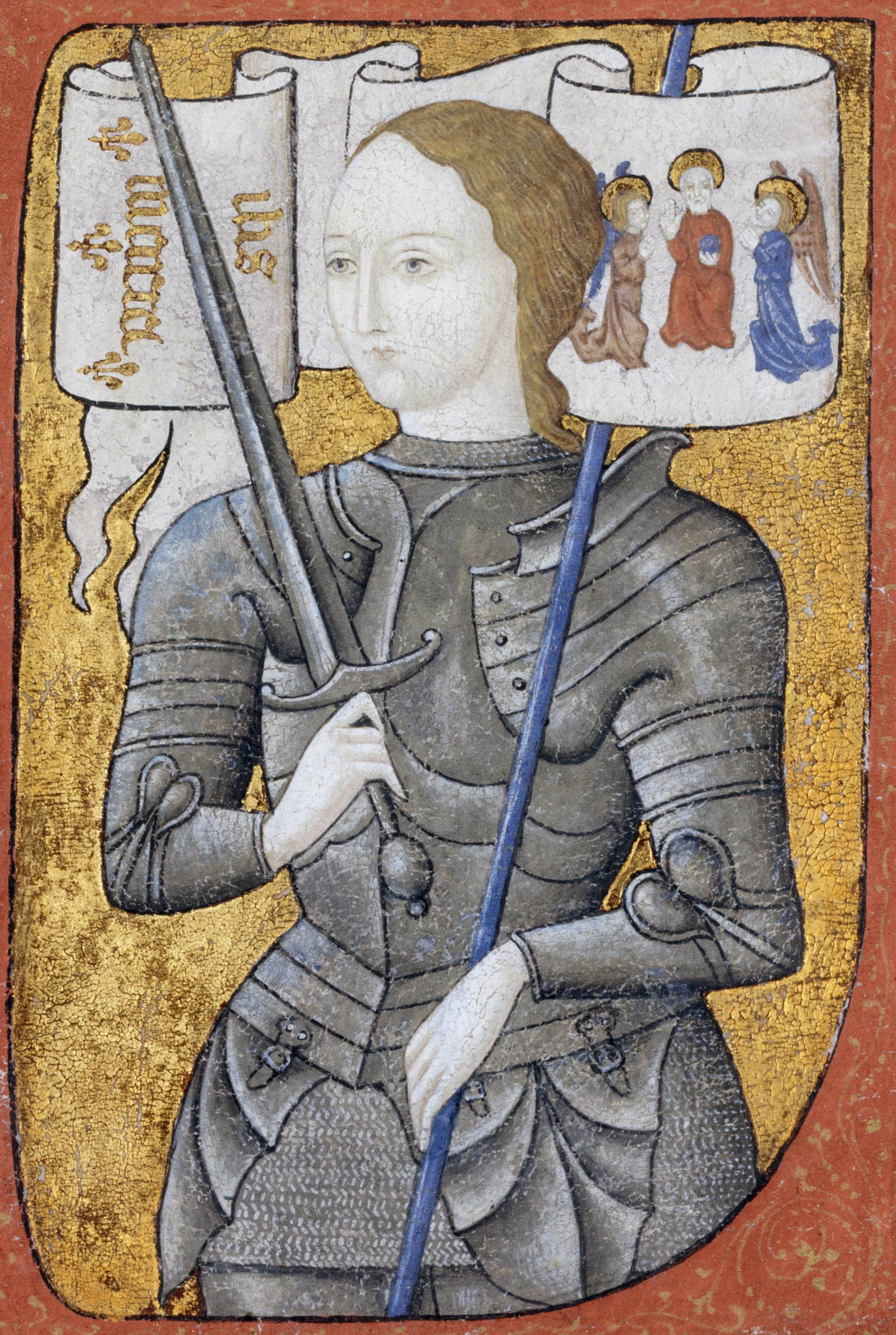
Joan of Arc Henry VI, Part 1.

- Jachimo is a villain in Cymbeline. He persuades Posthumus, wrongly, that he has slept with Posthumus' wife, Imogen.
- Jack:
  - Jack Cade (hist) leads a proletarian rebellion in Henry VI, Part 2.
  - See also John: especially Sir John Falstaff, who is often addressed as Jack.
- Jacquenetta is described as a light wench, and is the love interest of many comic characters in Love's Labour's Lost.
- Jailer:
  - Two Jailers guard the imprisoned Posthumus in Cymbeline.
  - A Jailer keeps Palamon and Arcite in custody in The Two Noble Kinsmen.
  - The Jailer's Brother accompanies his niece in her madness, in The Two Noble Kinsmen.
  - The Jailer's Daughter develops an obsessive love for Palamon, and releases him from prison, in The Two Noble Kinsmen. She descends into madness.
  - A sympathetic Jailer guards and commiserates with Antonio in The Merchant of Venice.
  - See also Gaoler.
- James:
  - James Gurney (fict) is a servant of Lady Faulconbridge, in King John.
  - James Soundpost, Simon Catling and Hugh Rebeck are minor characters, musicians, in Romeo and Juliet.
  - Sir James Blunt is a supporter of Richmond in Richard III.
  - Sir James Tyrrell (hist) is employed to murder the princes in the tower in Richard III.
- Jamy (fict) is a Scottish captain in Henry V.
- Jane Nightwork (fict) is a married libertine, presumably, remembered wistfully by Shallow and Falstaff in Henry IV, Part 2.
- Jaques :
  - Jaques is a melancholy lord in As You Like It.
  - Jaques DeBoys is a brother to Oliver and Orlando in As You Like It.
- Jessica is Shylock's daughter in The Merchant of Venice. She elopes with Lorenzo and converts to Christianity.
- A Jeweller sells a jewel to Timon in Timon of Athens.
- Joan la Pucelle (hist), better known to history as Joan of Arc, leads the Dauphin's forces against Talbot and the English in Henry VI, Part 1. Shakespeare presents her as an adulteress who fakes pregnancy in order to avoid being burnt at the stake.
- John:
  - Don John is the bastard brother of Don Pedro, and is the chief villain in Much Ado About Nothing.
  - Friar John is a minor character, who is unable to deliver a crucial letter from Friar Laurence to Romeo, in Romeo and Juliet.
  - John is a servingman of Mistress Ford: he carries Falstaff to Datchet Mead in a buck-basket, in The Merry Wives of Windsor.
  - John Bates (fict) is a soldier the English army in Henry V.
  - John of Gaunt, Duke of Lancaster (hist) is uncle to King Richard and father to Bolingbroke in Richard II.
  - John Gower (hist) is the "Presenter", or narrator, of Pericles, Prince of Tyre.
  - John Rugby is a servant to Caius in The Merry Wives of Windsor.
  - John Talbot is the son of Sir John Talbot. They die together bravely in battle in Henry VI, Part 1.
  - King John (hist) is the title character of King John: a king whose throne is under threat from the claim of his young nephew, Arthur.
  - Prince John of Lancaster (hist) is the younger brother of Prince Hal in Henry IV, Part 1, Henry IV, Part 2, and Henry V. He is also the Duke of Bedford who is Regent of France in Henry VI, Part 1.
  - Sir John Blunt is a supporter of the king in Henry IV, Part 2.
  - Sir John Coleville is a rebel captured by Falstaff in Henry IV, Part 2.
  - Sir John Falstaff (fict, but see Sir John Oldcastle and Sir John Fastolfe) is a central character of Henry IV, Part 1, Henry IV, Part 2, and The Merry Wives of Windsor. In the Henry plays, he is "bad angel" to prince Hal, and is eventually rejected by him. He is the lecherous gull of the title characters in Merry Wives. His death is reported in Henry V, although he is not a character in that play. He is (with Hamlet) one of the two most significant roles in Shakespeare.
  - Sir John Fastolfe (hist) is a coward, stripped of his garter in Henry VI, Part 1.
  - Sir John Montgomery (historically Thomas Montgomery) is a minor Yorkist character in Henry VI, Part 3.
  - Sir John Mortimer (hist) is an uncle of Richard Duke of York (1) in Henry VI, Part 3.
  - Sir John Stanley supervises Eleanor's penance in Henry VI, Part 2.
  - Sir John Talbot (hist) is the leader of the English forces in France, and therefore the chief enemy of Joan, in Henry VI, Part 1.
- Joseph is a servant of Petruchio in The Taming of the Shrew.
- Jourdain, with Southwell, Hume and Bolingbroke, are the supernatural conspirators with Eleanor Duchess of Gloucester in Henry VI, Part 2.
- Julia is the faithful lover of Proteus, who follows him disguised as a young man and is dismayed to discover his infatuation with Silvia, in The Two Gentlemen of Verona.
- Juliet:
  - Juliet is a title character in Romeo and Juliet. The daughter of Capulet, she falls in love with Romeo, the son of her father's enemy Montague, with tragic results.
  - Juliet, lover of Claudio, becomes pregnant by him, leading to his death sentence, which begins the action of Measure for Measure.
- Julius Caesar (hist) is the title character of Julius Caesar, an Emperor of Rome who is stabbed in the Capitol, on the Ides of March.
- Junius Brutus and Sicinius Velutus, two of the tribunes of the people, are the hero's chief political enemies in Coriolanus, and prove more effective than his military foes.
- Juno (myth) is presented by a masquer in The Tempest.
- Jupiter (myth) hears the pleas of the ghosts of Posthumus' family, in Cymbeline.
- Justice (title):
  - A Justice is a minor role in the trial of Froth and Pompey, in Measure for Measure.
  - The Lord Chief Justice (hist) is a dramatic foil to Falstaff in Henry IV, Part 2.
  - Justice Shallow (fict) is an elderly landowner in Henry IV, Part 2 and The Merry Wives of Windsor.
  - Justice Silence (fict) is an elderly friend of Justice Shallow in Henry IV, Part 2.

== K ==
Detail from King Lear mourns Cordelia's death by James Barry.

- Kate:
  - Kate Keepdown is a whore in Measure for Measure.
  - See also Lady Percy.
  - See also Katherine.
- Katharine/Katherine:
  - Katharine (hist) is the French princess who marries Henry V.
  - Katharine is a lady attending on the Princess of France, in Love's Labour's Lost. She becomes emotionally attached to Dumaine.
  - Katherine (sometimes "Kate" or "Katerina Minola") is the "shrew" from the title of The Taming of the Shrew, who is "tamed" by Petruchio.
  - Queen Katherine of Aragon (hist) is the first wife of King Henry in Henry VIII. She falls from grace, is divorced and dies.
  - See also Kate.
- Kate Keepdown is a whore in Measure for Measure.
- Keeper:
  - A door keeper (fict) bars the entrance of Cranmer to the council chamber, in Henry VIII.
  - A keeper (fict) gives Piers of Exton access to the imprisoned Richard in Richard II.
  - Two keepers (fict) arrest the fugitive Henry in Henry VI, Part 3.
- The Earl of Kent is a follower of the King in King Lear who evades banishment by disguising himself as a servant, and calling himself Caius.
- King (title):
  - First Player or Player King leads the company which visits Elsinore in Hamlet. He reads an excerpt as Priam, and plays the king in The Mousetrap.
  - King Claudius is the uncle and stepfather of the prince in Hamlet. He has murdered his brother Old Hamlet, has taken over his crown, and has married his queen, Gertrude.
  - King Edward:
    - Edward later King Edward IV (hist) is the eldest son of Richard, Duke of York (1) in Henry VI, Part 2 and Henry VI, Part 3 – in which he becomes king. He dies in Richard III.
    - Prince Edward of York later King Edward V (hist) is the eldest son of Edward IV and Queen Elizabeth. He appears in Henry VI, Part 3, and is the elder of the two princes in the tower in Richard III.
  - King of France:
    - The King of France (fict) is the husband of Cordelia in King Lear.
    - The King of France is cured by Helena, and in recompense he agrees to order Bertram to marry her, in All's Well That Ends Well.
    - The King of France (hist) is Henry's enemy in Henry V.
    - The Dauphin, later King Charles VII of France (hist) leads the French forces, with Joan, in Henry VI, Part 1.
    - King Lewis XI of France (hist), insulted by Edward IV's marriage to Lady Grey, allies himself with Warwick and Margaret in Henry VI, Part 3.
    - King Philip of France (hist) allies himself with Constance in support of Arthur's claim, but later makes peace with John in King John.
  - For King Hamlet see Old Hamlet.
  - King Henry:
    - Bolingbroke, later King Henry IV (hist) leads a revolt against King Richard in Richard II. He is the title character of Henry IV, Part 1 and Henry IV, Part 2 which chart the rebellions against him by the Percy faction, and his difficult relationship with his eldest son, Hal.
    - Hal, later King Henry V (sometimes called The Prince of Wales, Prince Henry or just Harry) (hist) is a central character in Henry IV, Part 1 and Henry IV, Part 2 and is the title character of Henry V. He has a closer relationship with Falstaff than with his father (Henry IV), but he eventually ascends the throne, rejects Falstaff, and leads the English to victory at Agincourt.
    - King Henry VI (hist), the title character of Henry VI, Part 1, Henry VI, Part 2, and Henry VI, Part 3, is a weak and ineffectual king, and the plays chart the rebellions against him, leading to his overthrow and murder.
    - The Earl of Richmond, later King Henry VII (hist) leads the rebellion against the cruel rule of Richard III, and eventually succeeds him as king.
    - King Henry VIII (hist) is the central character of the play Henry VIII, portrayed as a wise and strong ruler.
  - King John (hist) is the title character of King John: a king whose throne is under threat from the claim of his young nephew, Arthur.
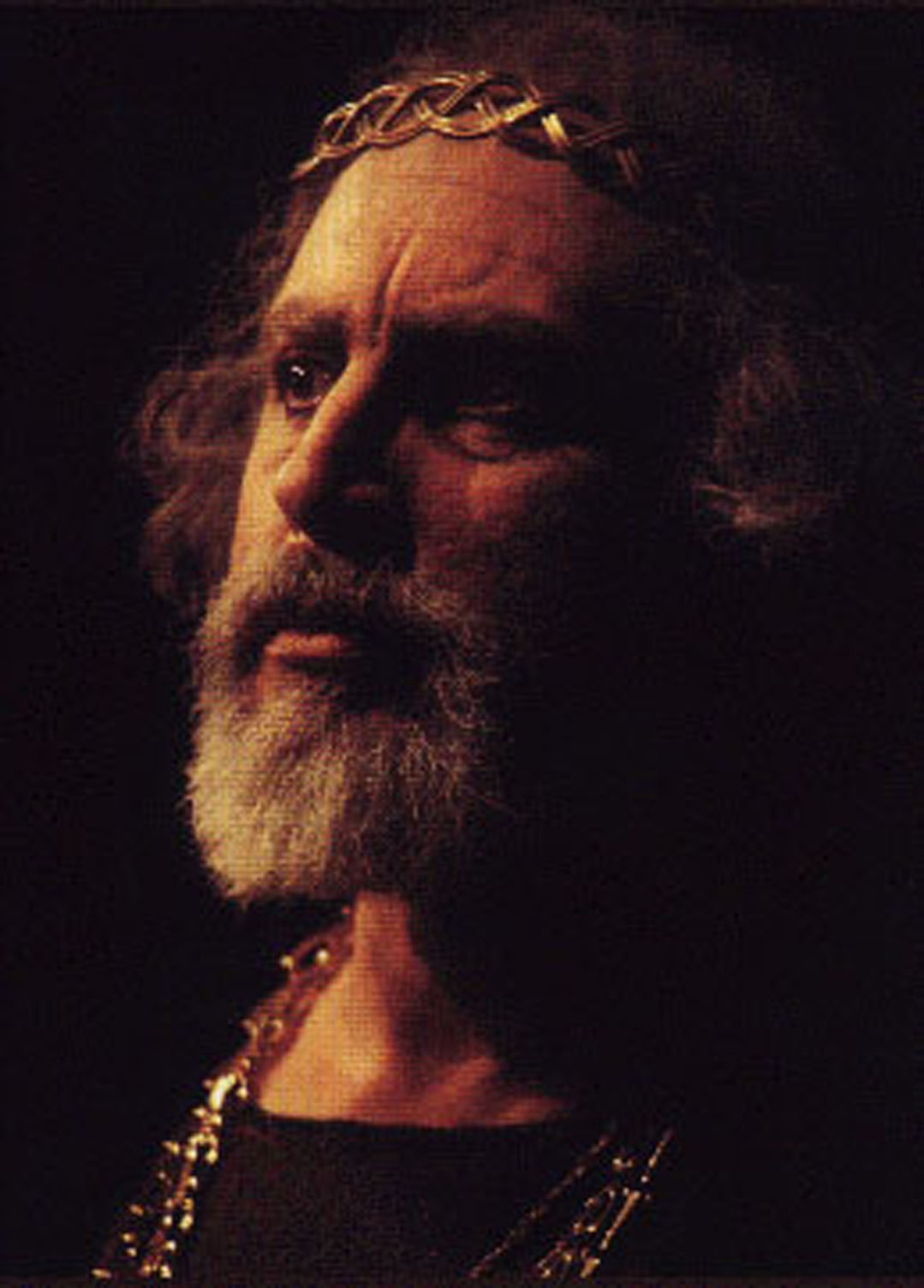
    Michael D Jacobs as King Lear, in a Carmel Shake-speare Festival production at the Forest Theater, Carmel, Ca, 1999
  - King Lear is the central character of King Lear. He divides his kingdom among his two elder daughters, is rejected by them, runs mad, and dies.
  - The King of Navarre (hist) and his three noble companions, Berowne, Dumaine, and Longaville, vow to study and fast for three years, at the outset of Love's Labour's Lost.
  - King Richard:
    - King Richard II (hist) is the title character of Richard II: a king who is deposed and eventually murdered.
    - Richard, Duke of Gloucester, later King Richard III (hist), brave but evil, is the third son of Richard, Duke of York (1). He is a fairly minor character in Henry VI, Part 2, is more prominent in Henry VI, Part 3, and is the title character in Richard III.
  - For King of Sparta see Menelaus.
  - For King of Troy see Priam.
  - A number of characters are kings, including Alonso, Antiochus, Leontes, Oberon, Polixines and Simonides.
- Knight:
  - Five knights, plus Pericles himself, compete in a tournament for the love of Thaisa, in Pericles, Prince of Tyre.
  - Six knights, three of them attending Palamon, and three attending Arcite, appear in The Two Noble Kinsmen. Palamon's knights are speaking roles.
  - A hundred knights, three of whom are speaking parts, and most of whom will inevitably be spoken of but never seen in performance, are followers of Lear in King Lear.

== See also ==
- List of Shakespearean characters (L–Z)

== Bibliography ==
=== Sources cited ===
- Bate, Jonathan, ed. (2006). Titus Andronicus. The Arden Shakespeare, third series. Bloomsbury Publishing. doi:10.5040/9781408160121.00000031. ISBN 9781903436059.

=== General references ===
- Anne Barton (ed.) New Penguin Shakespeare "The Tempest"
- Edward Burns (ed.) The Arden Shakespeare (3rd series) "King Henry VI Part 1"
- Andrew S. Cairncross (ed.) The Arden Shakespeare (2nd series) "King Henry VI Part 3"
- John D. Cox and Eric Rasmussen (eds.) The Arden Shakespeare (3rd series) "King Henry VI Part 3"
- T. W. Craik (ed.) The Arden Shakespeare (3rd series) "King Henry V"
- P. H. Davison (ed.) New Penguin Shakespeare "Henry IV Part One"
- P. H. Davison (ed.) New Penguin Shakespeare "Henry IV Part Two"
- Philip Edwards (ed.) New Penguin Shakespeare "Pericles"
- Bertrand Evans (ed.) The Signet Classic "The Two Gentlemen of Verona"
- Barbara Everett (ed.) Penguin Shakespeare "All's Well That Ends Well"
- R. A. Foakes (ed.) Penguin Shakespeare "Much Ado About Nothing"
- R. A. Foakes (ed.) Penguin Shakespeare "Troilus and Cressida"
- Charles R. Forker (ed.) The Adren Shakespeare (3rd series) "King Richard II"
- Antony Hammond (ed.) The Arden Shakespeare (2nd series) "King Richard III"
- Robert B. Heilman (ed.) The Signet Classic "The Taming of the Shrew"
- G.R. Hibbard (ed.) Penguin Shakespeare "Coriolanus"
- G. R. Hibbard (ed.) Penguin Shakespeare "Timon of Athens"
- E. A. J. Honigman (ed.) New Penguin Shakespeare "Richard III"
- E. A. J. Honigman (ed.) The Arden Shakespeare (2nd series) "King John"
- A. R. Humphreys (ed.) The Arden Shakespeare (2nd series) "King Henry IV Part 1"
- A. R. Humphreys (ed.) The Arden Shakespeare (2nd series) "King Henry IV Part 2"
- G. K. Hunter (ed.) New Penguin Shakespeare "Macbeth"
- G. K. Hunter (ed.) New Penguin Shakespeare "King Lear"
- David Scott Kastan (ed.) The Arden Shakespeare (3rd series) "King Henry IV Part 1"
- John Kerrigan (ed.) Penguin Shakespeare "Love's Labour's Lost"
- Ronald Knowles (ed.) The Arden Shakespeare (3rd series) "King Henry VI Part II"
- M. M. Mahood (ed.) New Penguin Shakespeare "Twelfth Night"
- Sonia Massai (ed.) Penguin Shakespeare "Titus Andronicus"
- Gordon McMullan (ed.) The Arden Shakespeare (3rd series) "King Henry VIII"
- Giorgio Melchiori (ed.) The Arden Shakespeare (3rd series) "The Merry Wives of Windsor"
- E. Moelwyn Merchant (ed.) New Penguin Shakespeare "The Merchant of Venice"
- Kenneth Muir (ed.) New Penguin Shakespeare "Othello"
- Kenneth Muir (ed.) The Arden Shakespeare (2nd series) "Macbeth"
- J. M. Nosworthy (ed.) New Penguin Shakespeare "Measure for Measure"
- H. J. Oliver (ed.) New Penguin Shakespeare "As You Like It"
- John Pitcher (ed.) Penguin Shakespeare "Cymbeline"
- Lois Potter (ed.) The Arden Shakespeare (3rd series) "The Two Noble Kinsmen"
- Norman Sanders (ed.) New Penguin Shakespeare "Julius Caesar"
- Ernest Schanzer (ed.) New Penguin Shakespeare "The Winter's Tale"
- T. J. B. Spencer (ed.) New Penguin Shakespeare "Romeo and Juliet"
- T. J. B. Spencer (ed.) New Penguin Shakespeare "Hamlet"
- Peter Ure (ed.) The Arden Shakespeare (2nd series) "King Richard II"
- Virginia Mason Vaughan and Alden T. Vaughan (eds.) The Arden Shakespeare (3rd series) "The Tempest"
- Stanley Wells (ed.) Penguin Shakespeare "The Comedy of Errors"
- Stanley Wells (ed.) New Penguin Shakespeare "A Midsummer Night's Dream"
- John Wilders (ed.) The Arden Shakespeare (3rd Series) "Antony and Cleopatra"
