= Erymas =

In Greek mythology, Erymas (Ancient Greek: Ἐρύμας, lit. 'protector' or 'guardian') may refer to the following characters who participated in the Trojan War:

- Erymas, a Lycian friend of Glaucus, the man who exchanged his golden armour for that of Diomedes, which was made of bronze. He was killed by King Idomeneus of Crete.
- Erymas, a Lycian warrior slain by Patroclus.
- Erymas, a Trojan soldier who was killed by Ajax the Greater.
- Erymas, a companion of Aeneas. He was murdered by Turnus, the man who opposed Aeneas in Italy.
