= Ocythous =

In Greek mythology, Ocythous (Ancient Greek: Ὠκύθοον, romanized: Okythoos, lit. 'swift-running' or 'she who runs swiftly') may refer to the following:

- Ocythous, one of the Corybantes.
- Ocythous, a Trojan warrior who participated in the Trojan War. He was slain by the Greek hero, Ajax the Greater.
- Ocythous, one of Actaeon's dogs which destroyed their owner when he was transformed into a deer.
