= Maeon =

Name in Greek mythology

In Greek mythology, the name Maeon or Maion (Ancient Greek: Μαίων, romanized: Maíon) may refer to:

- Maeon of Thebes, son of Haemon, endowed with prophetic abilities. He was one of the fifty men that laid an ambush against Tydeus when he came to Thebes as the messenger of the Seven against Thebes. Defending himself, Tydeus killed all these men except Maeon, who was to be spared in accordance with the gods' will. Later, when Tydeus fell in the war of the Seven, Maeon gave burial to him, a local Theban version of the myth asserts.
- Maeon, son of Haemon and Antigone, appears in a version of the myth according to which Haemon disobeyed Creon's orders to kill Antigone and hid her in a village, where she gave birth to a son. When the boy grew up, he came to Thebes to participate in ritual games and was identified by Creon, as all the descendants of the Spartoi had a special mark on their bodies. Despite the objections of Heracles, Creon killed the young man; Haemon then took both Antigone's and his own lives.
- Maeon of Troy, father of Agelaus; his son was killed by Ajax.
- Maeon, an ally of Turnus, brother of Numitor and Alcanor. Was killed by Aeneas.
- Maeon or Meion (Ancient Greek: Μηίων, romanized: Meíon), king of Lydia and Phrygia. In one account, he and his wife Dindyme are the parents of Cybele: he had his daughter exposed at Mount Cybelus, but she was suckled by leopards and survived.
- Maeon, the son of Apelles who married a daughter of the river-god Meles and became the father of Homer.
