= List of ancient Greek alliances =

Sample contribution assessment

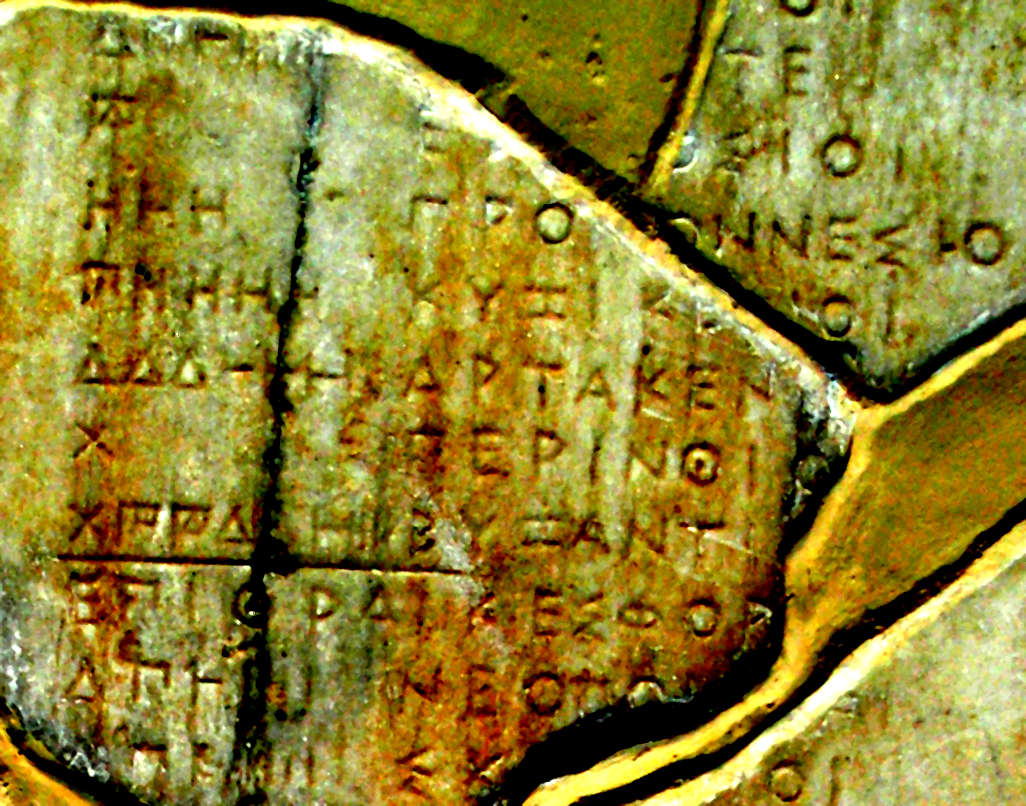
Athenian inscription, part of a tribute list of cash-paying members of the Delian League.

This is a list of known military alliances of ancient Greek poleis. They comprise the terms symmachia and koinon, both of which meant a league for the mutually supportive conduct of war, both offensive and defensive. The terms might be used with the same referents in the same source or be used mutually exclusively in the sources. Both words had other meanings, which are not covered here.

In theory at the time the poleis were meant to be autonomous. In fact the autonomy varied a great deal, which everyone of the times knew. Complaints and revolts were common. Apart from the domination of large states, such as Athens and Sparta, the leagues were named after the ethnic regions they were intended to defend. They were an intermediate step between the independent poleis and the Macedonian, Roman, or Persian provincial administrations that brought the poleis to an end and replaced the politeia with a local government subordinate to a province. "Federation," "confederacy", and a third term, sympoliteia only describe the degree of independence, or lack of it. Different scholars respect a wide degree of latitude.

== List ==
English names	Greek names	Members	Dates	Map or picture
League of Athena Ilias, League of the cities, League of Ilion, Aeolian League, Confederacy of Athena Ilias	Κοινὸν τῶν πόλεων, Koinon ton poleon	Ilion, Dardanos, Skepsis, Assos, Alexandria, Abydos, Lampsakos	In 306 BC Antigonus I granted to Ilion an alliance in the Troad for support of the yearly Panathenaia festival for Athena Ilias. Renewed in 77 BC by the Roman quaestor. Coins minted until the late 1st century. The league is known entirely from inscriptions.	
Aeolian or Aiolian Dodecapolis	Αἰολέες, Aioleis; Αἰολίδες πόλιες, Aiolides poleis	Cyme (called "Phriconian"), Lerisae, Neon Teichos, Temnos, Cilla, Notion, Aegiroessa, Pitane, Aegaeae, Myrina, Gryneia	Defined in Herodotus 149 as a dodecapolis. The many references to "the Aeolians" and "Aeolis" imply a koinon, as do joint operations by name with Ionia. Earliest use of name is Hittite Ayawalas, 14th cent. BC.	
Ionian League, Panionic League, Ionian Dodecapolis	Κοινὸν Ἰώνων, Koinon Ionon; Ἴωνες, Iones; Ἰάδες πόλιες, Iades poleis	Miletus, Myus, Priene, Ephesus, Colophon, Lebedus, Teos, Clazomenae, Phocaea, Chios, Erythrae, Samos, Smyrna (after start of the 7th Century BC)	Latest certain evidence of earliest presence is 650 BC. The League survived into Hellenistic times, until it was disbanded upon its annexation by the Roman Republic in 133 BC	
Galatian League, Galatian Commonwealth	κοινὸν Γαλατῶν, koinon galaton; κοινὸν τῶν Γαλατῶν, koinon ton Galaton; κοινὸν της Γαλατίας, koinon tes Galatias	Ancyra, Tavion, Pessinus	The koinon was an alternative government of the Galatians offered to them by Augustus on Galatia becoming a Roman province. (Note: Formerly each of these three tribal capitals sent a tetrad (four delegates) to a governing civil council. Now, a koinon was formed of the three poleis, and was placed in the care of another, religious council. The religion was the worship of deified Augustus)	
Chrysaorian League, Chrysaoric League, Chrysaorean Confederacy	σύστημα Χρυσαορικόν, systema Chrysaorikon	A block of Greco-Carian cities in Caria: Chrysaorium, Alabanda, Alinda, Amyzon, Ceramus, Mylasa, Kaunos, Stratonicea, Thera, possibly Labraunda.	First parliamentary act given at Labraunda in 267 BC under Ptolemid rule. Other cities were under Macedonian rule at different times. Ceased to exist under Roman rule.	
Lycian League	Λυκίων τὸ κοινόν, κοινὸν τῶν Λυκίων, koinon ton Lykion	About 28 poleis representing all of Lycia, judging by their individual minting of coins. These are listed in the article.	A voluntary pro-Roman alliance offered to the Roman Republic as an alternative to annexation by Rhodes. The Romans took it, treating Lycia as a free protectorate, 168 BC until 43 AD.	
Macedonian League, Macedonians (Note: The Macedonian koinon was perhaps the least like an alliance and most like a unified state (a chora called Μακεδονία) ruled by an autocrat. According to recent studies it was created piecemeal by Philip II, appearing in the 5th century BC under the ethnic Macedonians in an inscription. The four-part structure was the result of successive annexations: an original lowland Old Kingdom (Meris III), to which the mountainous Upper Macedonia (Meris IV) was added on the west side of the Axios River. Subsequently Merides II and I in that order were added on the east of the Axios. Philip called these divisions ethna as they were considered different peoples. The name Merides appears in the coins later, when they were integrated into the new whole. Obviously the numbering was assigned after the whole had developed, as it runs counter to the annexation. Philip's capital Pella, the original Macedonia, was thus in III.)	Κοινὸν τῶν Μακεδόνων, Koinòn tōn Makedónōn; Μακεδόνες, Makedones	Four merides (Note: Moderns present two theories: 1) The merides are Macedonian in origin 2) the merides are Roman. Exponents of 1) cite the koinon coins appearing under Philip V. Also, Meris is related to meros, "part", but the Romans would have created them as independent republics to begin with.) of poleis. (Note: There were many more settlements in Macedonia, but only poleis could belong to a koinon or participate in a sympoliteia. Macedonian poleis were created from settlements by Philip II, Alexander's father, during his initial modernization of the then backward kingdom of Macedonia.) Format: meris number, coin name, (Note: Eiher the koinon or a meris issued coins) literary name, capital city. I, protes, none, Amphipolis; II, deuteras, Amphaxitis, Thessalonika; III, none, Bottia, Pella; IV, tetartis, Upper (ano) Makedonia, Heraclea Lynci	According to its coinage, the League was created by Philip V of Macedon, r. 221-174 BC. (Note: More recent studies indicate the four districts were created by Philip II, r. 359-336 BC, under the designation of ethne. Although he granted many of their cities the status of poleis, thus serving as their founder, it is questionable whether Philip joined them into a koinon at this time. He called his arrangement Greater Macedonia. The coinage of the koinon waits for Philip V, who is clearly less powerful and less of an autocrat.) His son Perseus of Macedon, r. 179-168 BC, lost Macedon to Rome, which split the League into 4 republics, then recombined them into Macedonia (Roman province) in 146 BC.	
Chalcidian League, C. Federation, C.Confederation	Κοινὸν τῶν Χαλκιδέων, Koinon ton Chalkideon	Olynthus, Potidaea (Until 356 BC), Acanthus (420-379 BC, 377-348 BC), Argilus, Stageira, Methone (After 377 BC), Pydna (After 377 BC), Aphytis, Torone, Dium	Founded in 432 BC by Olynthus, Pydna (After 377 BC), Torone, Potidaea and a number of smaller cities, disbanded in 379 BC, but reestablished in 377 BC, and finally annexed in 348 BC by Philip II of Macedon	
Thessalian League, T. Confederacy	Κοινὸν τῶν Θεσσάλων, Koinòn tôn Thessalôn, Κοινὸν τοῦν Πετθαλοῦν, Koinòn toûn Petthaloûn, Κοινὸν τῶν Θετταλῶν, Koinòn tôn Thettalôn	The founder of the League divided it into 4 tetrades, or "fourths": Thessaliotis (Note: Kierion, Methylion, Orthos, Peirasia, Phakion, Thetonion.); Phthiotis (Note: eirasia, Pharsalos, Phyllos, Euhydrion, possibly Eretria.); Pelasgiotis (Note: Amphanai, Argoussa, Atrax, Gyrton, Kondaia, Krannon, Larisa, Mopsion, Pagasai, Pherai, Skotoussa.); Hestiaiotis (Note: Gomphoi, Metropolis, Pelinna, Phaloria, Pharkadon, Trikka.)	6th century to 146 BC	
Aenianian League	Κοινὸν τῶν Αἰνάνων, Koinon ton Ainianon		168 to 21 BC	
Oetaean League	Κοινὸν τῶν Οἰταίων, Koinon ton Oitaion		167 to 21 BC	
League of the Magnetes	Κοινὸν τῶν Μαγνητῶν, Koinon ton Magneton		197 BC to 297 AD	
Boeotian League	Κοινὸν τῶν Βοιωτῶν Koinon ton Boioton		c. 550 to 171 BC and 21 BC to 297 AD	
Phocian League	Κοινὸν τῶν Φωκέων, Koinon ton Phokeon	Abae, Aiolidai, Ambrysus, Amphicleia, Antikyra, Boulis, Charadra, Daulis, Delphi, Drymaea, Echedameia, Elateia, Erochos, Hyampolis, Cirrha, Ledon, Lilaia, Medeon, Tithorea, Parapotamii, Pedieis, Panopeus, Phlygonium, Stiris, Teithrorion, Trachis, Triteis, Troneia	The Phocian koinon enabled Phocis to act as one nation, which the sources called a chora ("country") and a patris ("fatherland"). Temples date to 7th century BC. 20-22 poleis were dioecised in 346 BC with the alliance at the end of the Third Sacred War. Some few made sympoliteiai subsequently.	
Amphictyonic league				
Euboean League	Κοινὸν τῶν Εὐβοιέων, Koinon ton Euboieon		c. 290 BC to 297 AD	
Delian League				
League of the Islanders	Κοινὸν τῶν Νησιωτῶν, Koinon ton Nesioton		c. 314 to c. 220 BC and 200 to 168 BC	
League of Corinth				
Achaean League	Κοινὸν τῶν Ἀχαιῶν, Koinon ton Achaion		280 BC to 146 BC, dissolved by the Romans after the Battle of Corinth (146 BC)	
Peloponnesian League				
League of Free Laconians, Eleutherolakones	Κοινόν τῶν Ἐλευθερολακώνων, Koinon tōn Eleutherolakōnōn	Gythium, Teuthrone, Las, Pyrrhichus, Caenepolis,Oetylus, Leuctra, Thalamae, Alagonia,Gerenia, Asopus, Acriae, Boeae, Zarax, Epidaurus Limera, Brasiae, Geronthrae, and Marius	The Eleutherolakones are first attested in 195 BC, when Roman general Flamininus separated perioikic coastal cities from the Spartan state after Rome's victory in the The Laconian War of 195 BC. Dissolved in 297 AD when Diocletian reformed the provincial administration.	
Arcadian League	Koinon ton Arkadon		370 to c. 230 BC	
Cretan League	Κοινὸν τῶν Κρηταιέων, later Κοινὸν τῶν Κρητῶν		3rd century BC to 4th century AD	
Epirote League	Κοινὸν τῶν Ἠπειρωτῶν Koinon ton Epiroton		c. 320 to c. 170 BC	
Acarnanian League, A. Confederation, A. Federation, Acarnanians	Κοινὸν τῶν Ἀκαρνάνων, Koinon ton Akarnanon	Stratos (until 252 BC), Thyrium, Leucas, Oeniadae, Astacus, Derium, Torybeia, Limnaea, Euripus, Heraclea (After the 330s BC), Anactorium (After 425 BC), Alyzeia, Palairos, Phara	Earliest certain date is 455 BC in response to an attack by the Messenians. Partitioned by Epirus and the Aetolian League in 230 BC, and dissolved after the battle of Actium in 30 BC. Attested in both literature and inscriptions. The specific impulse in 455 was defense, followed by nationalistic and economic measures.	
Aetolian League	Κοινὸν τῶν Αἰτωλῶν, Koinon ton Aitolon		early 3rd century to 146 BC	
League of the Oreioi, League of the Highlanders	Κοινὸν τῶν Ὀρειῶν, Koinon tōn Oreiōn	Elyrus, Hyrtacina, Tarrha, Lissus, Syia and Poecilasium; probably Cantanus	Founded in the late 4th century BC, dissolved before 183 BC. A sympolity of highland cities in southwest Crete and their coastal outports. The earliest secure evidence is coinage bearing the legend ΟΡ[ΕΙΩΝ] and a treaty with Magas of Cyrene (c. 280–260 BC; IC II.xvii.1). The federal sanctuary was the shrine of Diktynna at Lisos. The league is known from coinage, two inscriptions, and Polybius (4.53.6).	

== Reference bibliography ==
- Hatzopoulos, M.B. (2004). "Makedonia". In Hansen, M.H.; Nielsen, T.H. (eds.). An Inventory of Archaic and Classical Poleis (PDF). Oxford: Oxford University Press.
