= Bulis (disambiguation) =

Bulis is a genus of beetles. It may also refer to:

- Bulis (mythology), Greek mythological figure
- Bulis (Phocis), a town in Ancient Greece
- Bulis (surname)
- Curetis bulis, a species of butterfly
