= Hellenic League =

The Hellenic League or Hellenic Alliance most commonly refers to:

- Alliance of Greek city-states led by Sparta and Athens (480-478 BCE)
- League of Corinth, a federation of Greek states led by Philip II of Macedon and Alexander the Great (338-323 BCE)

It may also refer to:

== Other uses ==
- Coalition of Greek states led by Athens during the Lamian war (323-322 BCE)
- Coalition of Greek states under Antigonus and Demetrius I Poliorcetes (302 BCE)
- Alliance of Greek leagues, also known as the Symmachy, under Antigonus III Doson (224-221 BCE)
- Panhellenion, association of Greek cities under the Roman emperor Hadrian (131 CE)

== See also ==
- List of ancient Greek alliances
- Congress at the Isthmus of Corinth
- Amphictionic League
- Peloponnesian League
- Delian League
- Hellenic Football League
