= Acarnanian League =

Tribal confederation

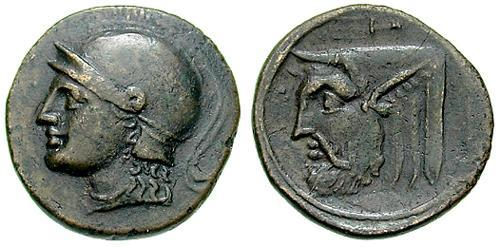
Federal coinage of the Acarnanian League

The Acarnanian League (Ancient Greek: τὸ κοινὸν τῶν Ἁκαρνάνων, to koinon tōn Akarnanōn) was the tribal confederation, and later a fully-fledged federation (koinon), of the Acarnanians in Classical, Hellenistic, and early Roman-era Greece.

== History ==
The League existed since the 5th century BC. It was at the time not a fully-fledged federation (sympoliteia) as elsewhere in Greece, but a loose confederation of the Acarnanian cities. An assembly of representatives met at Stratos, having also the power of negotiating treaties with other states, a supreme court existed at Olpae (in common with the Amphilochians), and there was a common coinage and cult, but no federal officials and no common foreign policy. Thus, although the League sometimes acted for all its members, as in the alliance with Sparta in 390 BC or the joining of the Second Athenian League in 375/4 BCE, at other times individual member city-states acted independently, e.g. during the Third Sacred War, where the cities Alyzia and Anaktorion participated as Theban allies while the rest of the League remained neutral. The Acarnanians agreed to provide 2,000 hoplites in the struggle against Philip II of Macedon, but as the latter occupied Ambracia, only a handful volunteers participated alongside Athens and Thebes in the Battle of Chaeronea. As a result, the leaders of the independence faction were banished, and the League became a member of the League of Corinth organized by Philip. During Alexander the Great's campaign in Asia, the Aetolians seized the town of Oiniadai from the League.

With the exception of Alyzia, the Acarnanians remained largely uninvolved in the struggles that followed the death of Alexander the Great in 323 BCE, but in 314 BCE Cassander arrived in Acarnania and reorganized the League on a truly federal basis. The island of Leucas joined the League soon after, following the eviction of its Macedonian garrison. The Acarnanian League was a member of the Hellenic League organized by Demetrius Poliorcetes, and then became subject to King Pyrrhus of Epirus. After Pyrrhus' death, in ca. 270 BCE, the Acarnanians and Aetolians settled their differences, agreeing on the Acheloos River as their mutual border, and concluded a perpetual alliance. The treaty specified the obligations of mutual military assistance, and the two leagues assured each other the rights of epigamia, citizenship, and acquisition of property. This treaty records seven strategoi (one each from Oiniadai, Derion, Stratos, Phoitia, Thyrreion, Anaktorion and Leucas), a hipparch (from Oiniadai), a foreign secretary (from Oiniadai), and a treasurer (from Stratos). The frequent occurrence of officials indicates that at the time it was the most important city of the League.

According to Polybius, however, soon after the Aetolians allied themselves with Pyrrhus' son. Alexander II of Epirus, and invaded Acarnania, dividing the country between them: the northern part with Leucas went to Epirus, and the south was incorporated into the Aetolian League. Following the extinction of the Aeacid dynasty in Epirus, in 230 BCE the Acarnanian League was reconstituted in the northern, former Epirote part of the country. Leucas was its capital, and only Anaktorion, Palairos, Thyrreion, and Medion were members.

Allied with the Illyrians, and then with the Makedonians and the Achaean League, in the Social War (220–217 BCE) the Acarnanians were able to recover Phoitia and Oiniadai. This success did not last long: in the First Macedonian War (214–205 BCE), Oiniadai was lost again, and in the Second Macedonian War (200–197 BCE) the Acarnanians were forced to capitulate to the Roman Republic, who however left them in their possessions and free to govern themselves. Oiniadai was returned after the Roman–Seleucid War. Despite their steadfast loyalty to Rome, the League lost Leucas after the Third Macedonian War (171–168 BCE), as it became an autonomous state, but Thyrreion became a member.

The Acarnanian League continued to exist even after the final establishment of Roman power over Greece in 146 BCE. It was only after the Battle of Actium in 31 BCE that the League was incorporated into the Roman province of Achaea.

== See also ==
- List of cities in ancient Acarnania
- List of ancient Greek alliances

== Sources ==
- Schwahn, Walther (1931). "Sympoliteia". Realencyclopädie der Classischen Altertumswissenschaft. Vol. Band IV, Halbband 7, Stoa–Symposion. col. 1171–1266.
