= Biandina =

Coordinates: 36°45′05″N 22°48′09″E

Biandina (Ancient Greek: Βιάνδινα), also known as Biadyna (Βιάδυνα), Biandyna (Βιάνδυνα), Biadinupolis or Biadinoupolis (Βιαδινουπολίς), was a town of ancient Laconia, located between Acriae and Asopus. Its name appears in an inscription reported by August Böckh.

Its site is located near the modern Elia/Elaia.
