= Charadra =

Charadra may refer to:

- Charadra (Epirus), a town of ancient Epirus
- Charadra (Messenia), a town of ancient Messenia
- Charadra (Phocis), a town of ancient Phocis
- Charadra (moth), a genus of moths
- Grewia, a genus of plants
