= National Assembly of Macedonia (1880) =

The National Assembly of Macedonia was established in 1880, as a reaction to the Congress of Berlin (1878) and composed of 32 representatives from all over Macedonia. The National Assembly of Macedonia established a Provisional Government, which published a Manifesto in 1881.

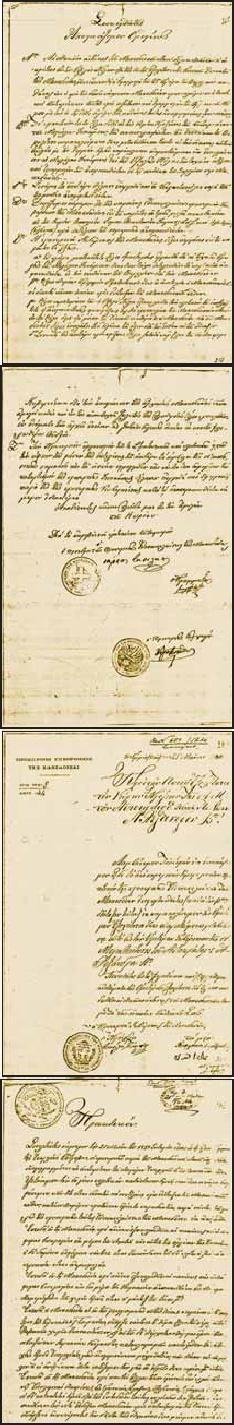
Documents of the Provisional Government of Macedonia: Protocol Solution, Letter to the Russian Consul in Thessaloniki and the Appeal of the Provisional Government

== Formation of the Assembly ==
Between May 21 and June 2, at Gremen Teke, near Ostrovo lake, Monastir Province, Ottoman Empire (now Arnissa, Greece), the National Assembly held its first session. The convocation of the National Assembly was initiated by the Greek Leonidas Voulgaris, a proponent of the idea about an Orthodox anti-Ottoman Balkan union, with the support of the Bulgarian Exarchate priest Konstantin Bufski. The Assembly was summoned to review the political situation of Macedonia in the aftermath of the Berlin Congress and the indifference of the Great Powers to force the Ottoman Empire to implement the mandatory Article 23 from the Berlin Agreement, namely, to give Macedonia a special autonomous status. On the agenda were the activities that had to be taken to achieve the “national cause”. The Assembly concluded that even after the latest big changes on the Balkans, when all other Christian nations gained national freedom and statehood: “Romania, Serbia and Montenegro gained a full independence, and Bulgaria, East Rumelia and Crete gained civil rights, it is only Macedonia, that had its own civilization from the most ancient times, was left without any help”. Then the National Assembly “unanimously decided to demand from the Ottoman state and Great powers swift implementation of the Article 23 of the Berlin Agreement for the Macedonian nation and for Macedonia”.

== Formation of a Provisional Government ==
The National Assembly elected a Provisional Government of Macedonia, named “Unity” as an executive and operational body that will undertake all necessary activities to achieve the “national cause: creation of Macedonian state”. It was decided that they will first demand, using legal means, a right for autonomy, recognized by the Great powers and sanctioned by the international Berlin Agreement from 1878. If the Ottoman government denies the fulfillment of this obligation, and Great powers do not force it to fulfill it, “the Provisional Government will call the Macedonian nation to arms, under the banner: Macedonia for Macedonians, to restore the ancient Macedonia.

In March 1881 the Provisional Government published a Manifesto in Kyustendil, Bulgaria, with a protocol decision of the Macedonian National Assembly, to the diplomatic representatives of the Great powers. The manifesto was drawn up in French and was sent to the European consuls. The manifesto was certified by a seal with the inscription in Greek "Provisional Government of Macedonia".

== Thrivia ==
The assembly and the proclaimed “government” were chaired by the Greek revolutionary of local Slavic background, the son of Anastasios Voulgaris, named Leonidas Voulgaris. He supported the Greek-Serbian alliance and the idea of Eastern federation. In a letter to Zahari Stoyanov, Voulgaris expressed the view: “When Romania, Serbia, Montenegro, Albano-Macedonia, Greece, Bulgaria, and if possible, Turkey unite, they would become a major power and this Oriental Federation shall become thè mainstay of peace in Europe". Nonetheless, according to the Macedonian historiography the Manifesto expressed Macedonian nationalism, portraying Macedonia as a separate ethnic-nation state with an ancient origin, in particular, an Ancient Macedonian origin.

== Sources ==
- Documents on the struggle of the Macedonian people for independence and a nation-state" - volume one, page 291 published by the Faculty of Philosophy and History - University of "Cyril and Methodius" - Skopje - 1985.
- Б’лгарската екзархија в Одринско и Македонија след Освободителната војна (1877–1878), vol. 1/1, Софиа: Синодално издателство, 1969, p. 461-466, 485. by Bulgarian Patriarch Kiril.
- Македонија во билатералните и мултилатерални договори на Балканските држави 1861–1913, ред. д-р Михајло Миноски - Државен Архив на Република Македонија.
