= Vezenkov =

Vezenkov (Bulgarian: Везенков) is a surname. Its female form is Vezenkova.

Notable people with the name include:

- Aleksandar Vezenkov (born 1995), Bulgarian basketball player
- Stojan Vezenkov (1828–1897), Bulgarian builder and activist
