= Barony of Geraki =

Medieval lordship

- Barony of the Principality of Achaea
- 1209–1260s
- Map of the Peloponnese with its principal locations during the late Middle Ages
- Capital: Geraki
- Area
  - Coordinates: 36°59′N 22°42′E
  - Type: Feudal lordship
- Historical era: Middle Ages
  - Established: 1209
  - Byzantine reconquest: 12 December 1260
Succeeded by
Despotate of the Morea

The Barony of Geraki was a medieval Frankish fiefdom of the Principality of Achaea, located on the western slopes of Mount Parnon in Laconia, of the Peloponnese peninsula in Greece, and centred on the castle of Geraki (Greek: Γεράκι, Ἰεράκιον; French: Le Gi[e]rachy; Italian: Zirachi, Zerachi). After the fall of Geraki to the Byzantines, the ruling family, the Nivelets, retained their baronial title and were compensated with new lands in Messenia, as the Barony of Nivelet.

== History ==
The Barony of Geraki was established ca. 1209, after the conquest of the Peloponnese by the Crusaders, and was one of the original twelve secular baronies within the Principality of Achaea. The barony, with six knight's fiefs attached to it, was given to Guy of Nivelet, who built the fortress of Geraki near ancient Geronthrae. Like the Barony of Passavant in western Laconia, Geraki was built as a stronghold in an unruly border region. It was not until ca. 1248, with the fall of the last Byzantine fortress, Monemvasia, that Laconia was fully pacified, and Geraki's purpose was to keep watch over the rebellious Tsakones who inhabited the northern Parnon.

Guy of Nivelet, who is securely attested ca. 1228/30, was succeeded as baron by John of Nivelet, perhaps his son. In the 1260s, Geraki fell to the resurgent Byzantines, but it is unclear exactly when. George Pachymeres mentions it as one of the fortresses (along with Grand Maigne, Mystras and Monemvasia) that Prince William II of Villehardouin agreed to hand over as ransom for his release from captivity. In reality, although Geraki was most probably not immediately surrendered, its exposed position made it vulnerable and it likely fell, if not in the first Byzantine offensives of 1263–64, then certainly by ca. 1268/70.

Following the loss of Geraki, the Nivelet family was compensated with new lands in Messenia. They kept their baronial title, but the new "Barony of Nivelet" was no longer a distinct geographical entity, but apparently an assemblage of dispersed fiefs tied to the family. The Nivelets survived until 1316, when the family was dispossessed due to the firm support of the then baron (Karl Hopf hypothetically names him John II) to the unsuccessful venture of Ferdinand of Majorca to seize the Principality. After defeating Ferdinand, Prince Louis of Burgundy had the last Nivelet baron executed and gave his lands to one of his own followers, Dreux of Charny.

== Sources ==
- Bon, Antoine (1969). La Morée franque. Recherches historiques, topographiques et archéologiques sur la principauté d'Achaïe [The Frankish Morea. Historical, Topographic and Archaeological Studies on the Principality of Achaea] (in French). Paris: De Boccard. OCLC 869621129.
- Miller, William (1921). Essays on the Latin Orient. Cambridge: Cambridge University Press. OCLC 457893641.
