= Asine (Laconia) =

Town of ancient Laconia on the Mani Peninsula

Coordinates: 36°40′06″N 22°30′00″E

Asine (Ancient Greek: Ἀσίνη) was a town of ancient Laconia on the Mani Peninsula. According to Strabo (1st century BCE), it was situated between the towns of "Amathus" (a false reading for Psamathus) and Gythium (modern Gytheio), near modern Skoutari. Asine was often under Spartan control.

While its historicity was never disputed, the exact identity and location of Asine have in modern times been in doubt due to the repeated errors of ancient writers. Further complicating matters was the presence of at least three cities named "Asine" in Greece. Herodotus and Thucydides (both 5th century BCE) wrote that a city named Asine located in what is now the neighboring region of Messenia was in Laconia—which was at the time correct as Messenia was then considered part of Laconia.

Polybius (2nd century BCE) writes that Philip V of Macedon (r. 221 – 179 BCE) invaded Laconia and suffered a repulse near Laconian Asine—which Polybius situates near Gythium. Polybius also mentions the town of Las. But Pausanias (2nd century CE), in describing the same event, places it not at Asine but rather near Las, which he located near the summit of a "Mount Asia"

It appears highly likely that the earlier Asine of Polybius and the later Las of Pausanias are one and the same place and the resemblance between Asia and Asine led Polybius to transpose the names. Polybius's error was then perpetuated by Strabo (1st century BCE) and, 500 years later, by Stephanus of Byzantium (6th century CE).

In the Roman period, Asine belonged to Sparta while most neighboring towns were part of the Union of Free Laconians.

Asine was resettled in 1451 as Skoutari.

== See also ==
- List of ancient Greek cities
