= Parapotamii =

Town of ancient Phocis

Coordinates: 38°33′14″N 22°48′22″E

Parapotamii or Parapotamioi (Ancient Greek: Παραποτάμιοι) or Parapotamia (Παραποταμία), both meaning near the river, was a town of ancient Phocis on the left bank of the Cephissus (whence its name), and near the frontier of Boeotia. Its position is described in a passage of Theopompus, preserved by Strabo, who says that it stood at a distance of 40 stadia from Chaeroneia, in the entrance from Boeotia into Phocis, on a height of moderate elevation, situated between Parnassus and Mount Hedylium; he adds that these two mountains were separated from each other by an interval of 5 stadia, through which the Cephissus flowed. The Cephissus flowed into the territory of Parapotamii after leaving that of Elateia and before that of Panopeus; Parapotamii's territory was adjacent to those of Ambrysus, Panopeus, and Daulis.

Pausanias emphasized the great fertility of its area which was such that it was even said that the name of Parapotamii was the designation for those who had their crops next to Cephissus and that they referred to a verse of Homer in the Catalogue of Ships of the Iliad that read: "And those who dwelt by the divine river Cephissus"

During the Greco-Persian Wars, Parapotamii was one of the places destroyed by the Achaemenid army under Xerxes I in 480 BCE In 395 BCE, its territory was sacked by the Boeotians, who however were unsuccessful in their attempt to assault the city. It was one of the cities devastated by Philip II of Macedon at the conclusion of the Third Sacred War. Pausanias mentions that, during the first Pythian Games (582 BCE) organized by the Delphic Amphictyony, in the youth boxing, Ecmeas of Parapotamii was a victor. He adds that after its destruction it was not rebuilt and that in his time (2nd century) there were no more ruins and no one remembered the exact place where it was. Plutarch in his life of Sulla speaks of the acropolis of the deserted city, which he describes as a stony height surrounded with a precipice and separated from Mt. Hedylium only by the river Assus.

The location of Parapotamii is near the modern village of Belesi (Levendi).
