= Euripus =

Euripus or Euripo(s) can refer to:

- Euripus Strait in Central Greece, between Euboea and the main Greek peninsula
- Chalcis, a town located on that strait, also known in the Middle Ages as Euripus
- Euripus (Acarnania), an ancient city in Acarnania, Greece
- Euripus (genus) a genus of butterflies
