= Epidelium =

Coordinates: 36°38′N 23°02′E

Epidelium or Epidelion (Ancient Greek: Ἐπιδήλιον), called Delium or Delion (Δήλιον) by Strabo, was a small town on the eastern coast of ancient Laconia, situated within the territories of Boeae, at the distance of 100 stadia from Cape Malea, and 200 from Epidaurus Limera. Epidelium was a sanctuary of Apollo, erected at the time of the Mithridatic War, when a wooden statue of the god floated to this spot from Delos, after the devastation of the island by Metrophanes, the general of Mithridates VI.

Its site is located north of the modern Agios Phokas.
