= Patronis =

Patronis may refer to:

- Patronis, an ancient town mentioned by Plutarch, generally identified with Troneia
- Jimmy Patronis (born 1972), Member of the U.S. House of Representatives from Florida's 1st district (2025-present), former Chief Financial Officer of Florida (2017-2025)
