= Astrateia =

Epithet of the Greek goddess Artemis

Astrateia (Ancient Greek: Ἀστρατεία) was a cultic epithet for the goddess Artemis in Greek mythology, under which she had a temple near Pyrrhichus in Laconia, where she was worshipped alongside Apollo Amazonius.

This aspect of Artemis was a goddess of the Amazons, who supposedly stopped the forward march of the Amazons at Pyrrhichus, where the Amazons established the cult of Astrateia, but the true meaning of the epithet is unclear. We know of this epithet in ancient sources only from a single mention in the geographer Pausanias's Description of Greece.

The Ancient Greek word astrateia was the antithesis of strateia ("service"), and had a range of literal meanings including "not serving in a military campaign", or "freedom from having to serve", or "refusal of the call to serve". In legal contexts, it was the name of a military crime similar to draft evasion (but distinct from the crime of leaving one's post, which in Greek was lipotaxion), and had some colloquial overlap with the idea of "cowardice". Regardless, later translators have rendered this epithet as "Artemis of the War Host", and consider this a warlike aspect of the goddess, which was fairly unusual for this goddess. The only other warlike epithet for the goddess would have been the also very obscure Artemis Hegemon.

It is sometimes assumed that this epithet comes from Artemis's cessation of the Amazons' military campaign, however not all scholars agree. The scholar Lewis Richard Farnell in his Cults of the Greek States advanced the hypothesis that this epithet was a linguistic corruption of the ancient Near Eastern goddess Astarte, and proposes that the connection with the Greek words strateia or astrateia came from a local folk etymology to account for a word the original meaning of which had been lost. Several other scholars have lent their support to this interpretation. As Pyrrhichus was located on the Laconian coast, it is not unlikely it may have overlaid some aspects of Near-Eastern influence on the template of an ostensibly Greek goddess, or vice versa. Some scholars, such as Isabella Solima, have gone as far to suggest that Pausanias was simply wrong, and the true epithet was some other name lost to time.

As an Eastern-influenced goddess of the Amazons, Astrateia is similar to Artemis Ephesia.

We possess some ancient coins depicting a martial Artemis that scholars believe are Artemis Astrateia. We also have some funerary inscriptions indicating the goddess had a female priesthood (hiereia) on the island.
