= Asopus (Laconia) =

Town of ancient Laconia

Coordinates: 36°41′04″N 22°50′33″E

Asopus or Asopos (Ancient Greek: Ἀσωπός), also known as Asopolis (Ἀσώπολις), was a town of ancient Laconia, on the eastern side of the Laconian Gulf, 60 stadia south of Acriae. It possessed a temple of the Roman emperors, and on the citadel a temple of Athena Cyparissia. At the distance of 12 stadia above the town there was a temple of Asclepius. Pausanias says that at the foot of the acropolis of Asopus were the ruins of the city of the Achaei Paracyparissii. Asopus was a town of the Eleuthero-Laconians.

Its site is located near the modern Plytra.
