= Marius (Laconia) =

Coordinates: 37°02′33″N 22°49′10″E

Marius or Marios (Ancient Greek: Μαρίος) was a town of ancient Laconia, belonging in the time of Pausanias (2nd century) to the Eleuthero-Lacones; it was situated 100 stadia east of Geronthrae. It contained a sanctuary of all the gods and, one of Artemis, and in each there were copious springs of water. It is represented by Mari, which stands on the road from Geraki (Geronthrae) over the mountains to Kremasti. There are ruins of the ancient town about a mile and a half (2.5 km) to the south of the modern village, and the place is still characterised by its abundant fountains.
