= Achilleius =

Harbour of ancient Laconia

Coordinates: 36°25′23″N 22°28′26″E

Achilleius or Achilleios (Ancient Greek: Ἀχίλλειος), also known as Achilleius Portus or Achilleios limen (Ἀχίλλειος λιμὴν), was a harbour of ancient Laconia. The Periplus of Pseudo-Scylax places it between Methone and Psamathus, inside Laconia.

Pausanias places it near Cape Matapan and the port of Psamathus, at about 150 stadia from Teuthrone. He says that at the end of Cape Matapan there was a temple in the shape of a cave and a statue of Poseidon.

Its site is located near the modern Marmari.
