= Psamathus =

Harbour of ancient Laconia

Coordinates: 36°26′14″N 22°28′57″E

Psamathus or Psamathous (Ancient Greek: Ψαμαθοῦς), called by Strabo Amathus or Amathous (Ἀμαθοῦς), was a harbour of ancient Laconia on the Mani Peninsula. The Periplus of Pseudo-Scylax places it "back-to-back" (ἀντίπυλος) with the harbour of Achilleius.

Pausanias places it near Cape Taenarum (Matapan) and Asine, at about 150 stadia from Teuthrone. He says that at the end of Cape Matapan there was a temple in the shape of a cave and a statue of Poseidon. Strabo and other ancient writers call Psamathus a polis (city-state).

Its site is located near the modern Porto Kagio.
