= John II of Nivelet =

John II of Nivelet (died 1316) is the name given in modern historiography to the last Baron of Nivelet in the Principality of Achaea, in Frankish Greece.

The Nivelet family had lost their original fief, the Barony of Geraki in the region of Lakonia, in the early 1260s to the Byzantine Empire, either in 1262, in exchange for the release of Prince William II of Villehardouin, taken captive by the Byzantines at the Battle of Pelagonia in 1259, or during the subsequent Byzantine offensives. Following the loss of Geraki, the family was compensated with new lands in Messenia and kept their baronial title, but the new "Barony of Nivelet" was no longer a distinct geographical entity, but apparently an assemblage of dispersed fiefs tied to his family.

John II is not attested by name in the sources; his name is a conjecture by the 19th-century medievalist Karl Hopf, which has since been repeated in several works dealing with the period. It is only known that in 1315–16 the then Baron of Nivelet supported Ferdinand of Majorca's attempt to claim the Principality of Achaea against Princess Matilda of Hainaut and her husband Louis of Burgundy. After Ferdinand was defeated and killed at the Battle of Manolada in July 1316, the Baron of Nivelet was executed by Louis of Burgundy, and his lands were given to one of Louis' Burgundian followers, Dreux of Charny.

== Sources ==
- Bon, Antoine (1969). La Morée franque. Recherches historiques, topographiques et archéologiques sur la principauté d'Achaïe [The Frankish Morea. Historical, Topographic and Archaeological Studies on the Principality of Achaea] (in French). Paris: De Boccard. OCLC 869621129.
