= Galatian League =

The koinon galaton (Ancient Greek: κοινόν Γαλατῶν; English: Galatian League or the Commonwealth of Galatians) was the koinon, a form of tribal assembly, of the Galatians. It has been described as a form of senate.

Strabo, writing in the age of Augustus, describes the Galatian League as retaining its tribal constitution under Roman rule, such as division into three tribes each governed by four tetrarchs. Peter Berresford Ellis has described the Galatian League as having parallels with the assembly of Gallic Celts in Lugdunum, and writes that the election system prevented despots from emerging, noting how no names for overall leaders emerges for a long time. Strabo reports that it was once governed by an assembly of 300 elected representatives of clans (or sub-clans) who met at a place called Drunemeton, but had since been reduced to the leadership of first Deiotarus, then Amyntas.

Tom Holland writes that the koinon galaton embraced the title of sebastenos – "favored by Augustus", and that the cult of the Caesars took firm roots in Galatia; some years after Augustus' death, he writes that the fact that the Res Gestae Divi Augusti has been found throughout Galatia, but nowhere else, strongly suggests the koinon decreed that it be reproduced and displayed across the region.

== See also ==
- Epistle to the Galatians
