= Erochus =

Coordinates: 38°38′02″N 22°31′37″E

Erochus or Erochos (Ancient Greek: Έρωχος) was a town of ancient Phocis that was destroyed in the Greco-Persian Wars by the army of Xerxes I in 480 BCE.

The city was again destroyed in the Third Sacred War, and was not rebuilt; it was located between Charadra and Tithronium, in the western part of the mount Cithaeron. Its site is located near Kato Souvala.
