= Symmachia (alliance) =

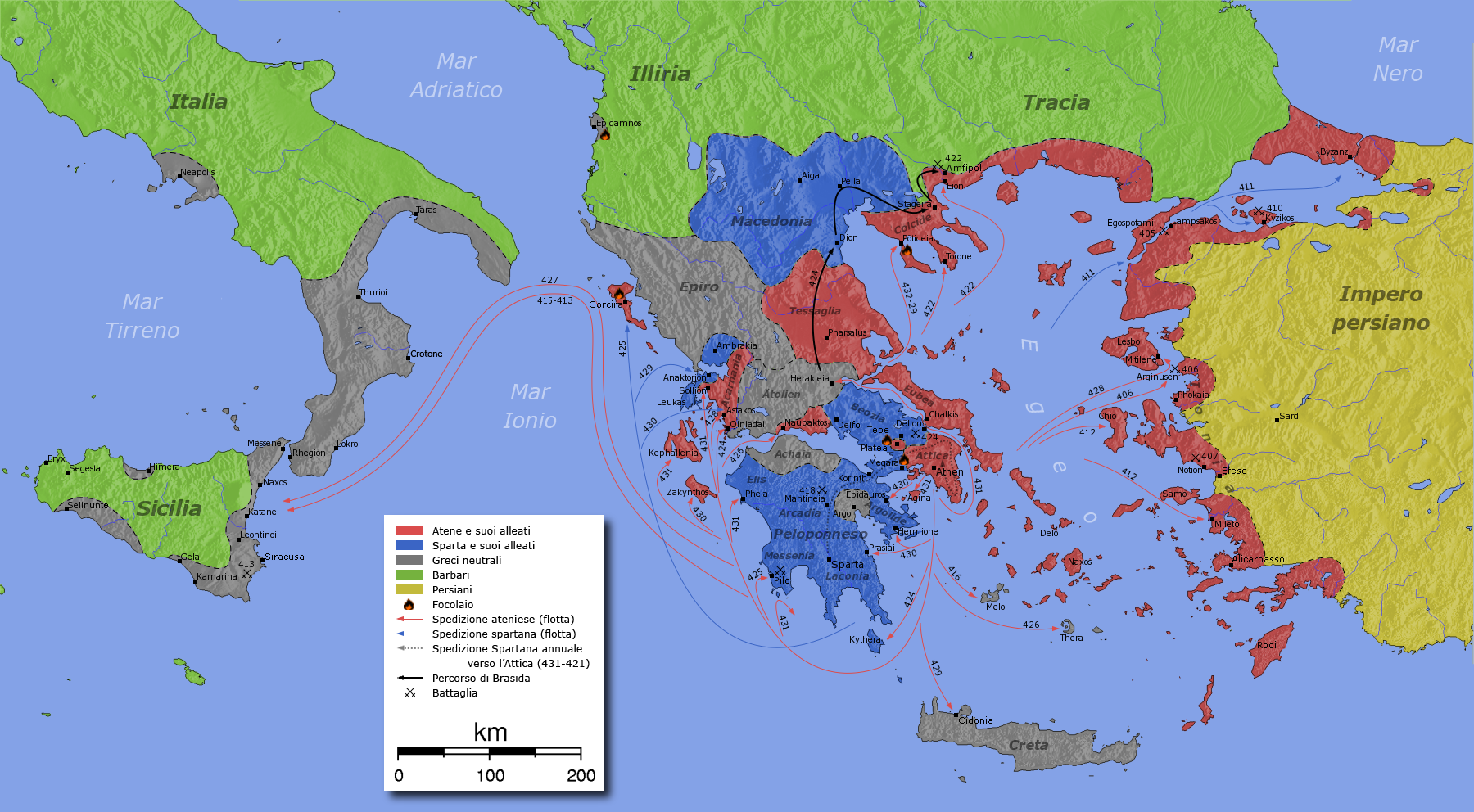
Map illustrating the various alliances of the Peloponnesian Wars

A symmachia (Greek: συμμαχία, romanized: symmachia) is and was in ancient times a military treaty between independent polities covering both offense and defense. In modern Greek the word also can mean an alliance among political factions to form a political party.

== Word history ==
A late alternative to alliance was koinon, "the common thing", meaning the common alliance. Koinon had many other public things in its semantic repertory, but its use with the ethnic name of the chief ally left no doubt.

=== List of modern international alliances ===
- Greek–Serbian Alliance of 1867
- Greek–Serbian Alliance of 1913
- Balkan League
- Balkan Pact
- First Balkan Alliance
- NATO
- Balkan Pact (1953)
- Italiotes

=== List of modern political parties that claim to be alliances ===
- Patriotic Alliance (Greece)

== See also ==
- Defense pact

== Sources ==
- Bolmarcich, Sarah (2013). "Symmachia". The Encyclopedia of Ancient History (First ed.). Blackwell Publishing Ltd. pp. 6472–6473.
