= Echedameia =

Town of ancient Phocis

Echedameia (Ancient Greek: Ἐχεδάμεια) was a town of ancient Phocis. It was destroyed by Philip II of Macedon in the Third Sacred War in 346 BCE. It is enumerated by Pausanias between Medeon and Ambrysus. This was the only source about the town until the discovery in 1863 of an inscription of a manumission that mentions the name of the city several times. Its exact location is unknown.
