= Torybeia =

Coordinates: 38°45′54″N 21°04′01″E

Torybeia was located in Acarnania in antiquity.

Torybeia (Ancient Greek: Τορύβεια) was a city in ancient Acarnania. It is known mainly through epigraphic evidence. Mention is made of the appointment of theorodokos of Torybeia, about the year 356/5 BCE to receive the theoroi of Epidaurus and also an inscription dated to around 330 BCE to accommodate those of Argos. It was one of the cities belonging to the Acarnanian League around 272 BCE.

Its site is tentatively located near the modern Komboti.
