= League of Corinth =

Historic federation of Greek states

Hellenic League Kοινὸν τῶν Ἑλλήνων
- 338 BC/337 BC–322 BC
- The Hellenic League under Philip II of Macedon
- Capital: Pella
- Common languages: Ancient Greek
- Religion: Ancient Greek religion
- Government: Hegemony
- Hegemon, Strategos, Autokrator of Greece
  - 338 BC/337 BC: Philip II
  - 336 BC: Alexander III, the Great
  - 304 BC: Demetrius I Poliorcetes
  - 224 BC: Antigonus III Doson
- Legislature: Synedrion
- History
  - Established: 338 BC/337 BC
  - Disestablished: 322 BC
Preceded by	Succeeded by
Greek city states; Macedon	Macedonian Empire

The League of Corinth, also referred to as the Hellenic League (Greek: κοινὸν τῶν Ἑλλήνων, koinòn tõn Hellḗnōn; (Note: lit. 'the community of the Greeks'. Diodorus also supplies the name: τό κοινὸν τῶν Ἑλλήνων συνέδριον, to koinon ton Hellenon synedrion, lit. 'the common council of the Greeks'.) or simply οἱ Ἕλληνες, the Héllēnes), was a federation of Greek states created by Philip II of Macedon in 338–337 BC. The League was created in order to unify Greek military forces under Macedonian hegemony (leadership) in a pan-Hellenic expedition against the Persian Achaemenid Empire.

King Philip was initially urged by Isocrates in 346 BC to unify Greece against the Persians. After the Battle of Chaeronea, the League of Corinth was formed and controlled by Philip. Alexander the Great utilized his father's league when planning his pan-Hellenic invasion of Asia to expand Macedon and take revenge on the Persian Empire. During the Hellenistic period, some Antigonid rulers of Macedon shortly revived the league, also known as the 'Hellenic Alliance'.

The title 'League of Corinth' was invented by modern historians because the first council of the League took place in Corinth, though the Greek word synedrion is better translated as congress. The adjective Hellenic derives from Hellenikos meaning "pertaining to Greece and Greeks". The League was the first time in history that the Greek city-states (except Sparta, who by then was deprived of Messenia and long since in terminal decline as a military power) would unify under a single political entity.

== Philip II of Macedon and the ideas of Panhellenic unity ==
From the mid-fourth century BC, the system of city-states (poleis) was gradually challenged by the ideas of pan-Hellenic unity, forwarded by some writers and orators, including Isocrates, who urged king Philip (in Isocrates' Philippus oration) to unify Greek powers against the Persians. Pan-Hellenic unity was only achieved with the rise of Macedon. Following his victory at the Battle of Chaeronea (337 BC), Philip was able to impose a settlement upon southern Greece, which all states accepted, with the exception of Sparta. Philip had no intention of besieging any city, nor indeed of conquering it, but rather he wanted the southern Greeks as his allies for his planned campaign against the Persians. In the months after the battle, he moved around Greece making peace with the states that opposed him, dealing with the Spartans, and installing garrisons. In mid 337 BC, he seems to have camped near Corinth and began the work to establish a league of the city-states, which would guarantee peace in Greece and provide Philip with military assistance against Persia. The principal terms of the concord were that all members became allied to each other, and to Macedon, and that all members were guaranteed freedom from attack, freedom of navigation, and freedom from interference in internal affairs. The council then declared war on Persia and voted Philip as strategos for the forthcoming campaign.

== Organization by Philip II ==
The League was governed by the Hegemon (leader) (strategos autokrator in a military context), the council (Synedrion), and the judges (Dikastai). Delegates of the member-states (Synedroi) were responsible for administering the common affairs of the League. They were summoned and presided over by a committee of presiding officers (Proedroi), chosen by lot in time of peace, and by the Hegemon in time of war. Decrees of the league were issued in Corinth, Athens, Delphi, Olympia and Pydna. The League maintained an army and a navy levied from member states in approximate proportion to their size, while Philip established Hellenic garrisons (commanded by phrourarchs, or garrison commanders) in Corinth, Thebes, Pydna and Ambracia.

== Treaty of the Common Peace ==
All member states of the League of Corinth were listed in the oath they swore under the 'Treaty of the Common Peace' (Koine Eirene). The peace was watched over by a Macedonian garrison positioned at the heights of the Acrocorinth and Chalcis, as well as at the Cadmea of Thebes. (A fragmentary inscription of the oath was found in Athens)

=== Text ===
[․․․․․․․․․21․․․․․․․․․․ Ποσ]ειδῶ ․․5․․

․․․․․․․․․․22․․․․․․․․․․ς ἐμμεν[ῶ ․․․․] ․․․․․․․․․․22․․․․․․․․․․νον[τ]ας τ․․․․ [․․․․․․․․18․․․․․․․․ οὐδ]ὲ ὅπλα ἐ[π]οί[σω ἐ]- [πὶ πημονῆι ἐπ’ οὐδένα τῶν] ἐμμενόντ[ω]ν ἐν τ- [οῖς ὅρκοις οὔτε κατὰ γῆν] οὔτε κατὰ [θ]άλασ- [σαν· οὐδὲ πόλιν οὐδὲ φρο]ύριον καταλήψομ- [αι οὔτε λιμένα ἐπὶ πολέ]μωι οὐθενὸς τῶν τ- [ῆς εἰρήνης κοινωνούντ]ων τέχνηι οὐδεμι- [ᾶι οὔτε μηχανῆι· οὐδὲ τ]ὴν βασιλείαν [τ]ὴν Φ- [ιλίππου καὶ τῶν ἐκγόν]ων καταλύσω ὀδὲ τὰ- [ς πολιτείας τὰς οὔσας] παρ’ ἑκάστοις ὅτε τ- [οὺς ὅρκους τοὺς περὶ τ]ῆς εἰρήνης ὤμνυον· [οὐδὲ ποιήσω οὐδὲν ἐνα]ντίον ταῖσδε ταῖς [σπονδαῖς οὔτ’ ἐγὼ οὔτ’ ἄλ]λωι ἐπιτρέψω εἰς [δύναμιν, ἀλλ’ ἐάν τις ποε̑ι τι] παράσπονδ[ον] πε- [ρὶ τὰς συνθήκας, βοηθήσω] καθότι ἂν παραγ- [γέλλωσιν οἱ ἀεὶ δεόμενοι] καὶ πολεμήσω τῶ- [ι τὴν κοινὴν εἰρήνην παρ]αβαίνοντι καθότι [ἂν ἦι συντεταγμένον ἐμαυ]τῶι καὶ ὁ ἡγε[μὼ]- [ν κελεύηι ․․․․․12․․․․․ κα]ταλείψω τε․․ — — — — — — — — — — — — — :𐅃 [— — — — — — — — — — : Θεσ]σαλῶν :Δ [— — — — — — — — — — — ῶ]ν :ΙΙ [— — — — — — — — — Ἐλειμ]ιωτῶν :Ι [— — — — Σαμοθράικων καὶ] Θασίων :ΙΙ — — — — — — — — — ων :ΙΙ: Ἀμβρακιωτ[ῶν] [— — — — — — — ἀ]πὸ Θράικης καὶ [— — — — — :] Φωκέων :ΙΙΙ: Λοκρῶν :ΙΙΙ [— — — — Οἰτ]αίων καὶ Μαλιέων καὶ [Αἰνιάνων :ΙΙΙ: — καὶ Ἀγ]ραίων καὶ Δολόπων :𐅃 [— — — — — — : Πε]ρραιβῶν :ΙΙ

[— — — — — : Ζακύνθο]υ καὶ Κεφαληνίας :ΙΙΙ

=== Translation ===
Oath. I swear by Zeus, Gaia, Helios, Poseidon and all the gods and goddesses. I will abide by the common peace and I will neither break the agreement with Philip, nor take up arms on land or sea, harming any of those abiding by the oaths. Nor shall I take any city, or fortress, nor harbour by craft or contrivance, with intent of war against the participants of the war. Nor shall I depose the kingship of Philip or his descendants, nor the constitutions existing in each state, when they swore the oaths of the peace. Nor shall I do anything contrary to these agreements, nor shall I allow anyone else as far as possible. But if anyone does commit any breach of the treaty, I shall go in support as called by those who need and I shall fight the transgressors of the common peace, as decided (by the council) and called on by the hegemon and I shall not abandon--------

of Thessalians--Elimiotes--Samothracians and Thasians---Ambraciots---from Thrace and---Phocians, Locrians Oitaeans and Malians and Ainianes --and Agraeans and Dolopes---Perrhaebi---of Zacynthus and of Cephalenia.

== Campaigns of Alexander the Great ==
The decision for the destruction of Thebes as transgressor of the above oath was taken by the council of the League of Corinth by a large majority. Beyond the violation of the oath, the council judged that the Thebans were thus finally punished for their betrayal of the Greeks during the Persian Wars. The League is mentioned by Arrian (I, 16, 7), after the Battle of Granicus (334 BC). Alexander the Great sent 300 panoplies to the temple of Pallas Athena in Athens, with the following inscription.

Alexander, son of Philip, and the Hellenes, except the Lacedaemonians, from the barbarians inhabiting Asia

Also, Diodorus Siculus (Βίβλος ΙΖ’ 48.[6]) mentions the council's decision in 333 BC, after the Battle of Issus, to send ambassadors to Alexander that will bring the Excellence of Greece (Golden Wreath). During 331 BC after the Battle of Megalopolis, Sparta appealed to Alexander for terms, to which he agreed on condition that the Lacedaemonians now joined the League of Corinth. During the Asiatic campaign, Antipater was appointed deputy hegemon of the League while Alexander personally recommended that the Athenians turn their attention to things; in case something happened to him, Athens would take over the power in Greece.

== Revivals by Antigonid kings ==
The League was dissolved after the Lamian War in 322 BC. Following the victory of Demetrius I Poliorcetes at the Battle of Salamis in 306 BC, his father, Antigonus I Monophthalmus, assumed the title of Basileus ("King" of Alexander's Empire) by the assembled armies and gained control over the Aegean, the eastern Mediterranean, and most of the Middle East. While Antigonus and Demetrius attempted to recreate Philip II's Hellenic league with themselves as dual hegemons, a revived coalition of the diadochi; Cassander, Ptolemy I Soter, Seleucus I Nicator, and Lysimachus decisively defeated them at the Battle of Ipsus in 301 BC, in which Antigonus I was killed.

Antigonus III Doson (r. 229 – 221 BC) revived the Hellenic League, this time better known as the 'Hellenic Alliance', being placed as the president himself in 224 BC. The league functioned as an alliance (symmachia) of existing Greek federations under Macedonian hegemony. This alliance consisted not of poleis, but rather of larger regional entities, like the Achaeans, Thessalians, Boeotians, Epirotes etc. These federations maintained internal autonomy, but were interdependent with respect to foreign policy. Antigonus' league expanded Antigonid rule in southern Greece recovering Arcadia in 224 BC and defeating king Cleomenes III of Sparta at the Battle of Sellasia in 222 BC. Doson managed to restore political stability in Greece and reestablish its position as the dominant power in Hellenistic Greece.

== See also ==
- Koinon
- Hellenic League (disambiguation)
- Macedon
- Aigai
- Ancient Corinth
- Congress at the Isthmus of Corinth

== Sources ==
- Cawkwell, George (1978). Philip of Macedon. Faber & Faber. ISBN 0571109586.
- Davis Hanson, Victor (2012). Makers of Ancient Strategy: From the Persian Wars to the Fall of Rome. Princeton University Press. ISBN 978-1400834259.
- Grant, David (2017). In Search of the Lost Testament of Alexander the Great. Matador. ISBN 9781785899539.
- Harle, Vihlo (1998). Ideas of Social Order in the Ancient World. Bloomsbury Academic. ISBN 031330582X.
- Erskine, Andrew (2009). A Companion to the Hellenistic World. John Wiley & Sons. ISBN 978-1405154413.
- Kinzl, Konrad H. (2010). A Companion to the Classical Greek World. John Wiley & Sons. ISBN 978-1444334128.
- Pohlenz, M (1966). Freedom in Greek Life and Thought: The History of an Ideal. Springer Science & Business Media. ISBN 9027700095.
- Scherberich, Klaus (2009). Koinè symmachía. Untersuchungen zum Hellenenbund Antigonos' III. Doson und Philipps V. (224–197 v. Chr.) [Koinè symmachía. Studies on the Hellenic League of Antigonus III Doson and Philip V (224–197 BC)]. Historia Einzelschriften. Vol. 184. Stuttgart: Steiner. ISBN 978-3-515-09406-1.
- Speake, Graham (2021). Encyclopedia of Greece and the Hellenic Tradition. Routledge. ISBN 978-1135942069.
- Yates, David C. (2019). States of Memory, The Polis, Panhellenism, and the Persian War. Oxford University Press. ISBN 9780190673567.
