= Greek–Serbian Alliance of 1913 =

Military alliance between the kingdoms of Greece and Serbia from 1913 to 1924

Treaty of Peace, Friendship and Mutual Protection
- The Kingdom of Greece (green) and the Kingdom of Serbia (orange) shown within Europe in 1914.
- Signed: 1 June 1913
- Location: Thessaloniki, Kingdom of Greece (now Greece)
- Parties: Greece; Serbia

The Greek–Serbian Alliance of 1913 was signed at Thessaloniki on 1 June 1913, in the aftermath of the First Balkan War, when both countries wanted to preserve their gains in Macedonia from Bulgarian expansionism. The treaty formed the cornerstone of Greek–Serbian relations for a decade, remaining in force through World War I until 1924.

== Background ==
During the First Balkan War, both Greek and Serbian armies concluded their operations in Macedonia by late 1912, while the Bulgarian army was directed mainly towards Thrace. As a result, the former succeeded in taking control of most of Macedonia, including its largest city, Thessaloniki, which was occupied by the Greek army in early November. Bulgaria nevertheless demanded most of Macedonia for herself, relying on the crucial role its army had played in facing the bulk of the Ottoman army in the First Balkan War, as well as on the pre-war agreements with Serbia regarding their mutual territorial claims in northern Macedonia. Both Greece, which had not signed any agreement on territorial partition, and Serbia, which in the London Conference of 1912–13 was forced by the Great Powers to cede its conquests in Albania in favour of the newly created Albanian Principality, opposed Bulgarian claims and insisted on an uti possidetis division of territory.

== Negotiations and signing of the alliance ==
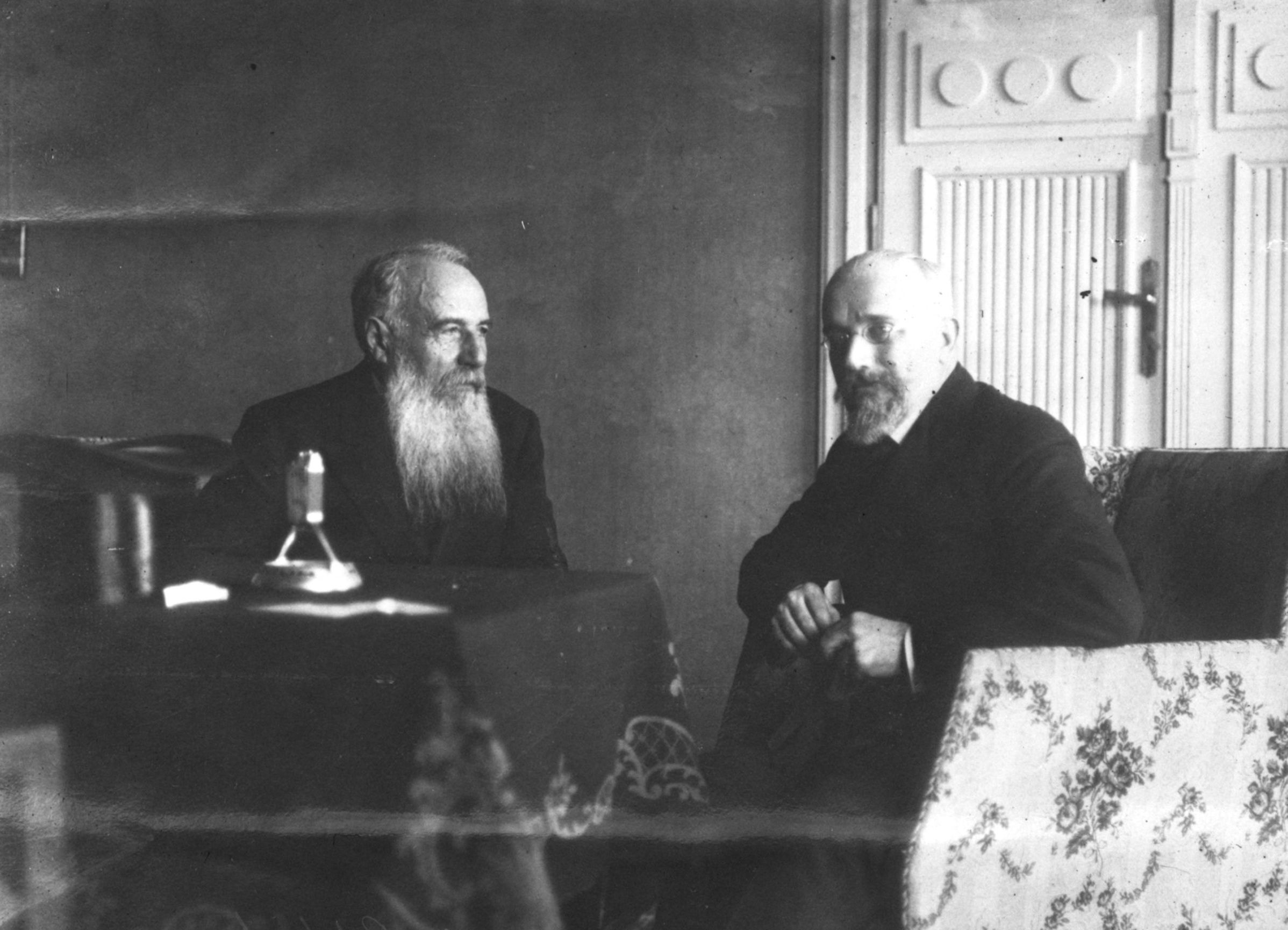
The Prime Ministers of Serbia and Greece, Nikola Pašić and Eleftherios Venizelos, in 1913

On 9 March 1913, the Greek Foreign Minister Lambros Koromilas instructed the Greek ambassador to Belgrade to sound out the Serbian government with a view to a bilateral alliance treaty. Preliminary discussions quickly bore fruit, and on 5 May Koromilas and the Serbian ambassador to Athens signed the first protocol, where both sides pledged mutual support against Bulgaria should the latter refuse to acknowledge the territorial status quo. The protocol also included a 50-year commercial agreement which allowed the use of Thessaloniki by Serbian companies. This protocol was then followed by a military convention signed on 13 May at Thessaloniki. The Serbian government however refused to ratify the latter, insisting that Greece take on itself the previous Bulgarian pledge to provide 200,000 troops in the case of an Austrian attack. The Greek government was reluctant to agree to this, but following the clashes between Greek and Bulgarian troops among the mutual demarcation line at Nigrita and Mount Pangaion, as well as the view of Prime Minister Eleftherios Venizelos that an Austro-Serbian war would soon draw the other Great Powers into the fray, it agreed.

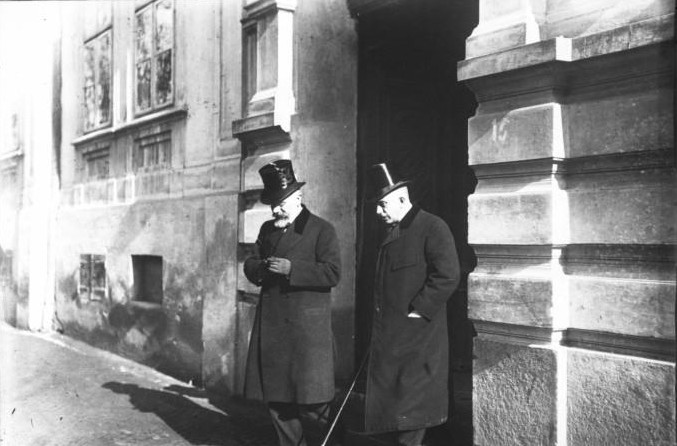
Venizelos and the Greek ambassador to Serbia, I. Alexandropoulos, leaving the Serbian Foreign Ministry

The final Treaty of Peace, Friendship and Mutual Protection was signed at Thessaloniki on 1 June 1913, by the Greek ambassador to Belgrade, Ioannis Alexandropoulos, and the Serbian ambassador to Athens, Mateja Bošković. Article 1 gave a mutual guarantee of the signatories' territorial possessions, concluded a defensive alliance and precluded each government from unilaterally concluding a peace treaty. Article 2 pledged the two states to a common front in the negotiating table against Bulgaria. Article 3 delineated the Greek–Serbian border (presently the border of Greece and the Republic of North Macedonia) based on the demarcation line between the respective armies. Articles 4 and 5 stated each country's territorial claims on Bulgarian-controlled territory (the line Gevgelija–Vardar River–Bregalnica–Osogovska Planina for the Serbs and Belasica–Eleftheres Gulf for the Greeks), committed them to seek international mediation, and to meet Bulgarian armed aggression towards either signatory with all available forces. The attendant military convention obliged each country to come to the other's aid with all available forces should either be attacked by a third power, or, if one of the signatories declared war first, to maintain a favourable neutrality and conduct a partial mobilization (40,000 men for Greece and 50,000 for Serbia). The signature of the Greek–Serbian alliance marked the demise of the Balkan League. On 30 June, Bulgarian troops attacked the Greek and Serbian lines, beginning the Second Balkan War.

== Impact and aftermath ==
The alliance played an important role in World War I, when Serbia was attacked by Austria. Venizelos mobilized the Greek army, but met with the refusal of the Germanophile King Constantine I to enter the war on the side of the Entente Powers. In an attempt to force the king's hand, in mid-1915 Venizelos allowed a British-French force to land in Thessaloniki in order to aid the Serbs, establishing the Salonica front. The crisis between Prime Minister and King over the issue of the country's participation in the war led to the National Schism, which plagued Greek political life until the 1930s. The Treaty of Alliance was finally unilaterally cancelled by the new Kingdom of the Serbs, Croats and Slovenes in 1924, as a reaction to the controversial Greek-Bulgarian Politis–Kalfov Protocol on minorities.

== See also ==
- Balkan League, 1912
- Greek–Serbian Alliance of 1867

== Sources ==
- Bataković, Dušan T. (2004). "Serbia and Greece in the First World War : an overview". Balkan Studies: Biannual Publication of the Institute for Balkan Studies. 45 (1): 59–80. ISSN 2241-1674.
- Hall, Richard C. (2000). The Balkan Wars, 1912–1913: Prelude to the First World War. Routledge. pp. 98–100. ISBN 0-415-22946-4.
- Papadrianos, Adrianos (2004). "Greco-Serbian talks towards the conclusion of a treaty of alliance in May 1913 and the beginning of negotiations for the establishment of a Serbian Free Zone in Thessaloniki". Balkan Studies: Biannual Publication of the Institute for Balkan Studies. 45 (1): 39–44. ISSN 2241-1674.
- Svolopoulos, Konstantinos (1977). "Ο Β′ Βαλκανικός Πόλεμος" [The Second Balkan War]. In Christopoulos, Georgios A. & Bastias, Ioannis K. (eds.). Ιστορία του Ελληνικού Έθνους, Τόμος ΙΔ΄: Νεώτερος Ελληνισμός από το 1881 έως το 1913 [History of the Greek Nation, Volume XIV: Modern Hellenism from 1881 to 1913] (in Greek). Athens: Ekdotiki Athinon. pp. 335–351. ISBN 978-960-213-110-7.
