= Bulis (surname) =

Bulis is a surname with multiple etymologies. In the Czech Republic, it has a feminine form, Bulisová. Notable people with this surname include:

- Christopher Bulis, English science fiction writer
- Henry C. Bulis (1830–1897), American politician
- Jan Bulis (born 1978), Czech hockey player
- Jānis Bulis (born 1950), Latvian Catholic bishop
- Mor Bulis (born 1996), Israeli tennis player
