= Trachis (Phocis) =

Trachis (Ancient Greek: Τραχίς), and Trachis Phocica (Τραχίς ἡ Φωκική) to distinguish it from the Trachis in Malis, was a small city of ancient Phocis, situated upon the confines of Boeotia, and on the road to Lebadeia.
