= Stojan Vezenkov =

Bulgarian stonemason and revolutionary

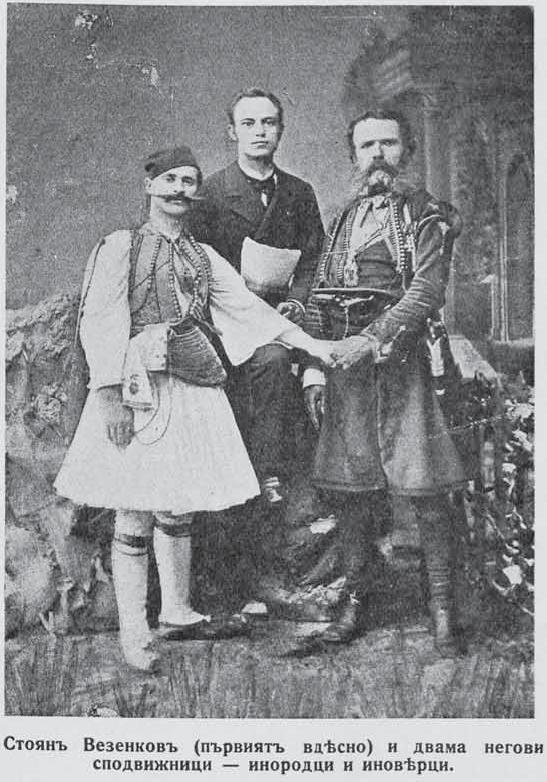
Stojan Vezenkov (right) with two of his associates.

Stojan Vezenkov or Stojan Vezenković (Bulgarian/Russian: Стоян Везенков; Macedonian: Стојан Везенков, Kruševo, Ottoman Empire 1828 – Kiev, Russian Empire, 19 January 1897) was a Bulgarian builder and stonemason from Ottoman Macedonia, who later became a pan-Slavic agent and organizer of anti-Ottoman resistance on the Balkans.

== Life ==
He was born in the Macedonian town of Krushevo, then the Ottoman Empire. Stojan was a builder and gradually rose to become a master. He worked 25 years as a builder of public buildings. His name became known after having built two Turkish barracks in Bitola and Sarajevo. In addition Vezenkov built several notable bridges over the river Nisava in Nis and over Maritsa in Edirne. Near Bitola he built a beautiful church. In this way he established contacts with the Sublime Porte, receiving gifts personally by the Sultan and often resided in Istanbul. After the Crimean War (1853–1856) Stojan used his contacts and became associated with foreign diplomatic representatives in Istanbul. He maintained contacts with the Russian embassy in Constantinople and personally with the ambassador Nikolay Pavlovich Ignatyev.

In 1859 he tried to create a revolutionary committee in Krusevo. From 1861 he had regular contact with the Russian consuls in Thessaloniki, Istanbul and Bitola – Alexei Lagovski, Alexei Lobanov-Rostovsky and Michail Hitrovo. Vezenkov visited Russia and met with the Russian Emperor Alexander II in the Crimea, where he spent several time and was granted a Russian citizenship. Later Vezenkov moved back to the Ottoman Empire and established contact with the Serbian diplomatic representative in Istanbul Jovan Ristic. In 1866 during the Greek Cretan uprising the Serbian government, after consultation with Russia, decided to prepare an uprising against the Ottomans and organize the First Balkan Alliance. With this aim in Albania and Macedonia was sent Stoyan Vezenkov. In 1867 during a trip to Greece for the purchase of a weapons, Stojan was arrested by the authorities. In Nis, he was sentenced to death by hanging, but during the execution the rope tore off. Stojan was reprieved and his sentence was changed to imprisonment for life. His brother Constantine, who at that time was a doctor in Russia, wrote a statement to the Emperor Alexander II. The statement was signed by 50 prominent Russian public figures, dignitaries and relatives of the yard. Alexander II, who personally knew Vezenkov, sent a letter to the Sultan asking for clemency.

After his release in 1868 Vezenkov arrived in Belgrade, where he became a member of the Bulgarian legion. It was created after Bulgarian notables in Romania concluded an agreement with Serbia to establish there a Bulgarian military school to instruct leaders for a future uprising in Bulgaria. However, the Legion was disbanded by Sebian authorities in 1868, despite the opposition of the Russian diplomats. Then Vezenkov remained without livelihood. In his frustration, Stojan began to present to the Serbian writer Milos Milojevic folk songs from Macedonia, which he translated into Serbian. The translated songs, Vezenkov presented as Serbian originals, having added into them a names of ancient Slavic gods and other stories, fabricated by himself. Therefore, he was criticized by Lyuben Karavelov, while the forged collection of folk songs and legends of Milojevic, was exposed by Stojan Novakovic.

Later he was among the illegally sent by the Serbian government spies in Ottoman Empire, to plan rebellion during the Serbian–Ottoman War (1876–78). Vezenkov was captured by the Turks, near Nis, but escaped. Then Stojan moved to Romania and was among the organizers of the Bulgarian voluntary army units there, which took part in the Russo-Turkish War of 1877–1878. Vezenkov participated in the Russian engineering corps during the war. His both brothers, Petar and Constantine were killed as volunteers in Bulgaria. Vezenkov was the only Bulgarian, present at the signing of the Treaty of San Stefano. For his heroism he was awarded the Russian Saint George's cross for bravery. With the treaty Macedonia was formally ceded to Bulgaria, and the Russian diplomat Michail Hitrovo was sent there, to prepare the creation of a Christian militias. Hitrovo choose Vezenkov to help him in this undertaking. During the Kresna-Razlog Uprising in 1879, that broke out following the Congress of Berlin, which, instead of ceding Macedonia to Bulgaria, returned it to Ottoman control, an armed detachment, led by Vezenkov was organized in Ohrid. After the failure of the Uprising, Vezenkov went back to Russia. He died in Odessa in 1897.

His son Vladimir, was a Russian officer and took part in Macedonian-Adrianopolitan Volunteer Corps of Bulgarian army during the Balkan wars. His great-great grandson Vladimir, keeps in Sofia, the ring that Sultan Abdülmecid I had bestowed on Vezenkov because of his great talent as a builder. The ring is handed by tradition to every firstborn son of the family.

== Sources ==
- Stojančević, Vladimir (1990). Srbija i oslobodilački pokret na Balkanskom poluostrvu u XIX veku. Zavod za udžbenike i nastavna sredstva. p. 100. "крајевима Македоније пре 1850. године посебну политичку мисију вршио је Стефан Верковић као повереник српске владе, а касније, за запа- дну Македонију и Албанију, веома агилни Стојан Везенковић."
- Milić, Danica (1980). Srbija u završnoj fazi Velike istočne krize 1877-1878 (in Serbian). Prosveta. p. 159. "Y кумановски, кривопаланачки и у скопски Kpaj били су илегалио послати повереници, као што je напр. био cnyMaj са CiojaiioM Везенковипем,* kojh су радили на припреман>у македонског народа да спреман дочека почетак ..."
- MacKenzie, David (1985). Ilija Garašanin: Balkan Bismarck. East European Monographs. ISBN 978-0-88033-073-2.
