= Charadra (Messenia) =

Charadra (Ancient Greek: Χαράδρα) was a town of ancient Messenia that according to Greek mythology was built by Pelops. It is cited by Strabo, who relates a tradition according to which Pelops, who after his sister Niobe married Amphion, brought colonists from Boeotia to Messenia and founded, in addition to Charadra, the cities of Thalamae and Leuctra.

It has not been precisely located. However, it has been suggested that it could have been located in the area around Cardamila.
