= Caenepolis =

Town of ancient Laconia

Coordinates: 36°27′38″N 22°26′34″E

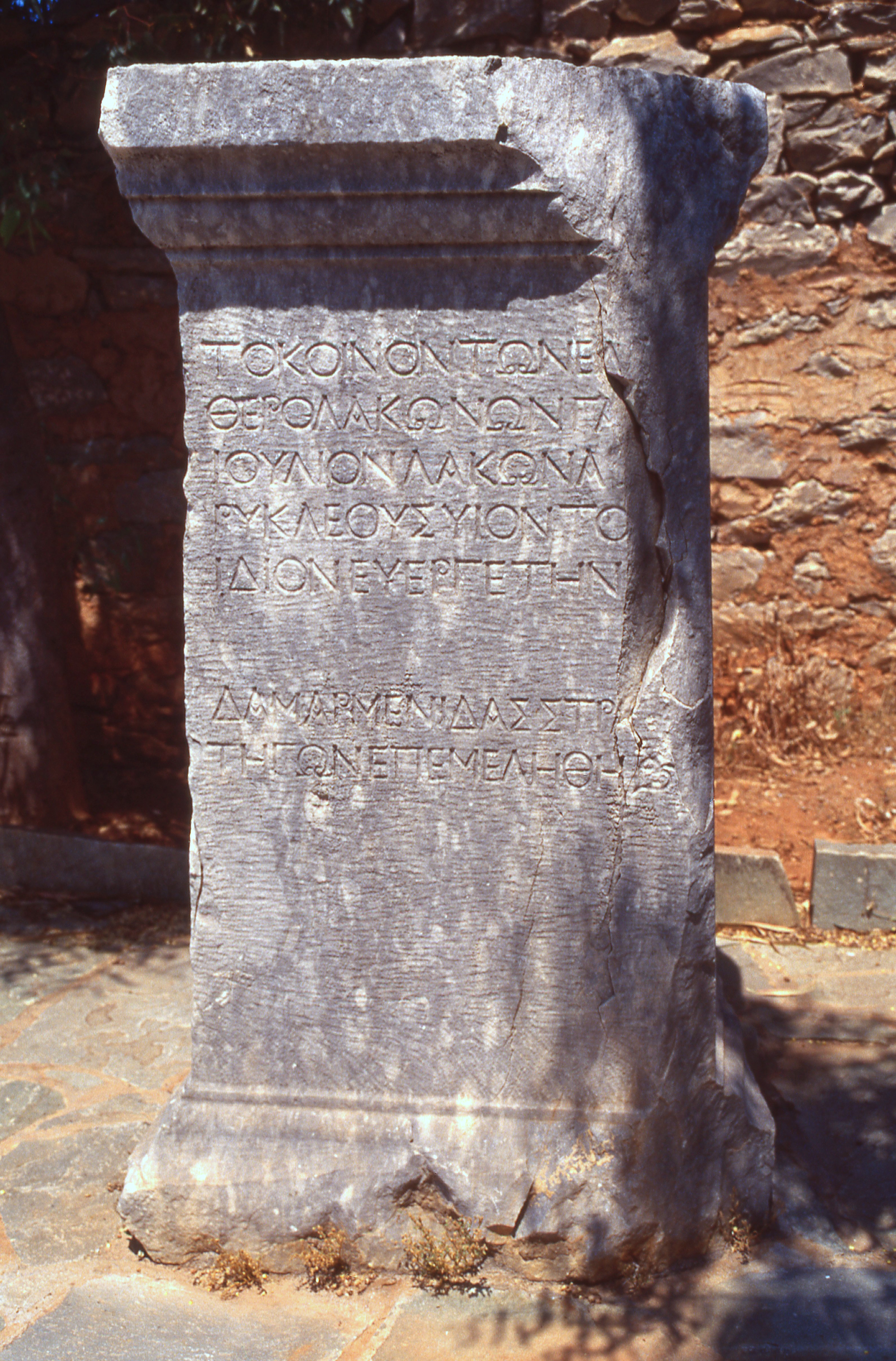
Inscription by the koinon of the Eleutherolakones in honor of Gaius Julius Lakon, early 1st century CE, at Kainepolis

Caenepolis or Kainepolis (Ancient Greek: Καινήπολις, lit. 'new town'), also called Caene or Kaine (Καινή), was an Ancient Greek town of Laconia on the Mani Peninsula north of Cape Matapan. It is probably the same town mentioned by Strabo under the corrupt form Cinaedium or Kinaidion (Κιναίδιον). It contained a temple of Demeter and another of Aphrodite, the latter near the sea.

The modern village of Kyparissos stands on the site of this town. Some ancient remains and inscriptions of the time of the Antonines and their successors have been found here. On the door-posts of a small ruined church are two inscribed quadrangular stelai, decorated with mouldings above and below. One of the inscriptions is a decree of the Taenarians, and the other is by the League of Free Laconians (τὸ κοινὸν τῶν Ἐλευθερολακώνων) in honor of Gaius Julius Lakon, the son of Gaius Julius Eurycles of Sparta. We have the testimony of Pausanias that Caenepolis was one of the Eleuthero-Laconian cities; and it would appear from the above-mentioned inscription that the maritime Laconians, when they were delivered from the Spartan yoke, formed a confederation and founded as their capital a city in the neighbourhood of the revered sanctuary of Poseidon. The place was called the New Town (Caenepolis); probably as a successor settlement to Taenarum.
