= First Balkan Alliance =

1866 alliance between Serbia, Montenegro, and Greece

- Type: Military alliance
- Context: Anti-Ottoman Empire
- Drafted: 1866
- Signed: 5 October 1866 (Serbia–Montenegro); 26 August 1867 (Serbia–Greece)
- Negotiators: Ilija Garašanin
- Parties: Serbia (organizer); Montenegro (1866); Greece (1867)

The First Balkan Alliance (Serbian: Први балкански савез/Prvi balkanski savez) was a system of agreements concluded by the Principality of Serbia in the period of 1866–68 to unite the nations of the Balkans in a common struggle against the Ottoman Empire. The plans for forging this alliance were based on the organization of a major general uprising, as opposed to individual uprisings by the various ethnic groups in Ottoman territory. According to the plans, the Albanians would begin the uprising, followed by Serb and Greek volunteers and finally and simultaneously by the regular armies of Serbia and Greece. According to the plans and agreements, after a successful war against the Ottomans, the Balkan nations would establish a united federation.

This alliance was conceived as part of one of various proposals for a Balkan federation, planned as a buffer zone between East and West. Members of the First Balkan Alliance were Serbia, Montenegro, Bulgarian revolutionary committees, the Croatian People's Party, Greece and Romania. The major role in establishing of the First Balkan Alliance was played by Serbia, under Prince Mihailo Obrenović and Prime Minister Ilija Garašanin.

== Background ==
In the middle of the 19th century, most of the territory of Balkans was still part of the Ottoman Empire, with several newly established independent or autonomous entities like Serbia, Greece, Bulgaria and Montenegro. All of them struggled to expand their influence and territory at Ottoman expense. Their intention was strongly opposed by Austria who opposed development of Balkan nations and revolutions in the Ottoman provinces of Europe (Rumelia). Austria's position was based on its own expansionistic plans on the Balkans and on fear that a strong Slavic state would attract Slavic citizens of the Austrian Empire. After defeat in the war against France in 1859 and against Prussia in 1866, the influence of Austria weakened.

Napoleon III was the champion of the idea of Balkan nationalism and fostered Serbia and Greece to build alliances and undermine Ottoman influence in the region. France planned to resolve the Balkan Eastern Question through gathering of all Balkan Slavic people, including Bulgarians, around Serbia as their pillar. This was not only informally suggested by French diplomats since 1861, but also formally proposed in Saint Petersburg in 1867. The establishment of Balkan alliances was supported and aided by Russia because it corresponded with its policy of promoting Balkan unity.

== Alliance agreements ==
The establishment of the Balkan alliance was campaigned by Prince Mihailo Obrenović of Serbia. To establish the First Balkan Alliance, the Principality of Serbia signed a series of contracts in the period 1866–68. The first contract was signed with Montenegro in 1866. The next contract was signed in autumn of 1866 with the People's Party in Croatia-Slavonia led by Catholic bishop Josip Juraj Strossmayer. This contract was followed by contract with Bulgarian Revolutionary Secret Society in 1867, with Greece in 1867 and with Romania in 1868.

=== Montenegro ===
The agreement between Serbia and Montenegro was signed on 5 October 1866 in Cetinje. According to the agreement, Serbia and Montenegro would act as an unified Serb country.

=== Bulgarian societies ===
Contemporary Bulgarian leaders maintained friendly relations with the Serbian government and Serbia was regarded as a brother state, which was acting as a protector of its Slavic brethren. However, in the second half of 1866, Serbia failed to contact any serious Bulgarian political party. Nevertheless, in 1867, a Bulgarian society, active in Bucharest took the initiative. That was the so-called "Benevolent Society". This Society was urged on by the Russian diplomats to approach the Serbian state with a draft-agreement. The document was titled "Programme for Serbo-Bulgarian (Bulgaro-Serbian) political relations and the cordial relationships between them". The Bulgarian side proposed the founding of a Serbo-Bulgarian (Bulgaro-Serbian) dual state, headed by the Serbian Prince. This state was to be named Yugoslav Tsardom and was to have a common government, legislation, army etc. The draft defined also the territories that would constitute Bulgaria as follows: Bulgaria (Moesia), Thrace and Macedonia and per the Serbian newspaper, Vidov Dan (No. 38, March 29, 1862), the Bulgarian-Serbian frontier extended from the Danube in North, along the Timok and South Morava Rivers and then along the Black Drin River to the Lake Ohrid. Garašanin accepted the Bulgarian proposal in a letter from June 1867, but he diplomatically refused to sign the document, fearing how representative this organisation had been. On the other hand, the establishment of the Balkan alliance concerned other Bulgarian organisations, which perceived it as an of implementation Garašanin's twenty-year-old Načertanije.

=== Macedonia ===
The Serbian government planned to organize an uprising of the population of Macedonia and for that reason established a network of agents in western Macedonia, Stojan Vezenkov being most notable among these.

=== Greece ===
A military alliance treaty between the Kingdom of Greece and the Principality of Serbia was signed on 26 August 1867. The treaty had been negotiated by Greek minister Zanos and Serbian ministers Ristić, Petronijević and Garašanin.

=== Romania ===
At the beginning of February 1868 the last of alliance agreements was signed with Romania. This agreement was mostly about trade relations. It confirmed that most of the Balkan countries were more ready to negotiate improvement of commercial relations than to accept firmer obligations.

=== Croatia and Slavonia ===
The government of Serbia maintained close relations with the People's Party in Croatia-Slavonia, a neo-Illyrian party led by Catholic bishop Josip Juraj Strossmayer. Garašanin struggled for the idea of Yugoslavia (dominated by Serbia) and supported cooperation with Croats.

Matija Mrazović was in charge of the foreign affairs of the People's Party. In his correspondence with Strossmayer he frequently discussed the contract between Serbian government and People's Party, without explaining its character or its date. This contract was apparently signed in Autumn of 1866. The most important purpose of this contract and its main objective was the capture of Ottoman Bosnia by Serbia, as the first step in the creation of an independent south Slavic state. Mrazović believed that Serbia could not survive as an independent state if Austria-Hungary would capture Bosnia and Herzegovina from Ottomans. The People's Party actively participated in the preparation of Serbian capture of Ottoman Bosnia. On 29 December 1867 Mrazović informed the Government of Serbia that it can count on thousand Croats employed in a factory near Sarajevo.

In 1868 Prince Mihailo gave up war against the Ottoman Empire and instead intended to sign a treaty with Austria, despite Garašanin's Yugoslavist ideas. Mrazović could not accept the thought that Serbia gave up its agreed action in Bosnia and saw this as a rejection of an important precondition for survival of Serbia.

=== Albanians ===
Garašanin believed that Albanians would be the biggest obstacle in case of general anti-Ottoman uprising in the Balkans, so he tried to establish cooperation with Albanian leaders. Already in 1844 Garašanin established relations with Catholic Albanians (Mirdita). Thanks to Mirdita's Catholic priest Gaspar Krasniqi, with whom Garašanin began communication in 1846, Garašanin signed an agreement about united activities with Mirdita chieftain Bib Doda in 1849. Garašanin believed that Albania should be established as an independent state. The eventual Albanian state was to encompass territories between rivers Drin (Drim) and Aoös (Vojuša).

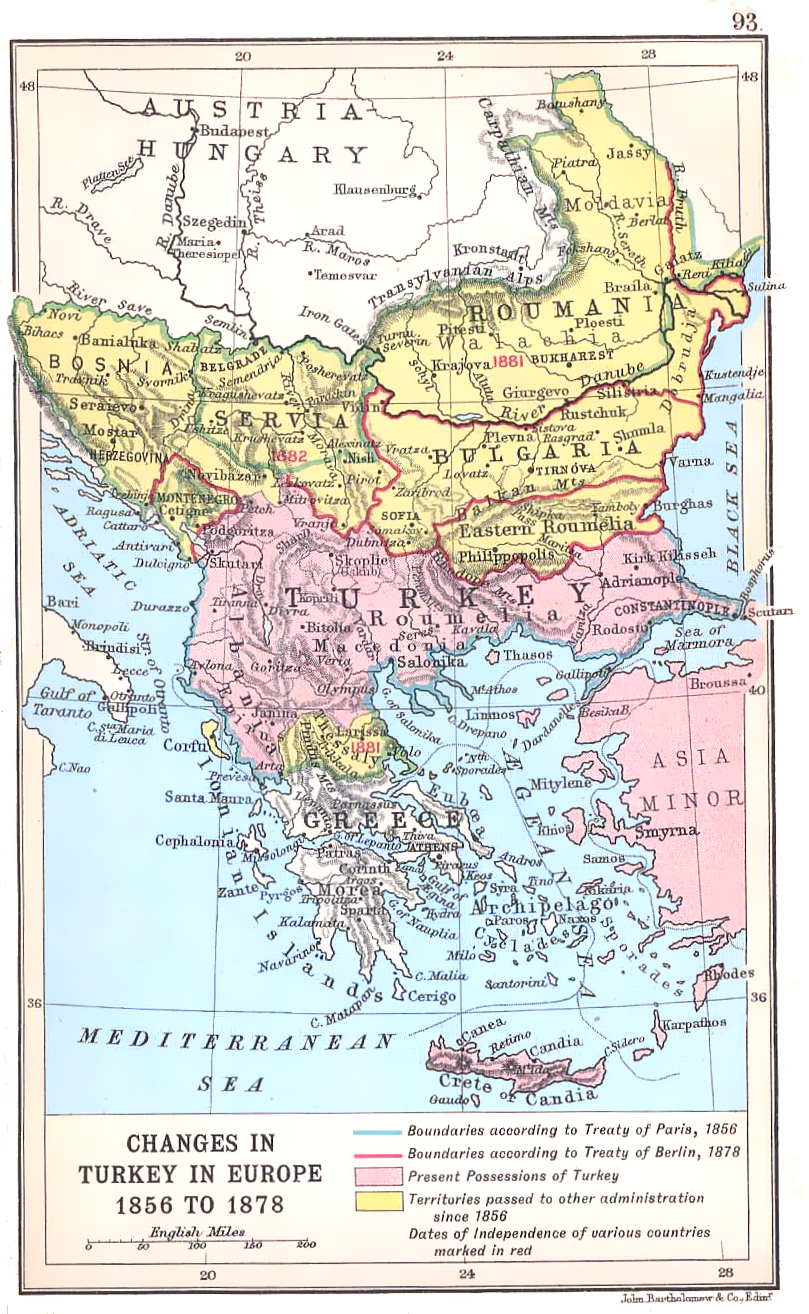
Map of changes of the Ottoman Balkan territory in 1856–78

In 1864 Garašanin sent captain Ljubomir Ivanović to northern Albania. Ivanović closely cooperated with Gaspar Krasniqi until the middle of 1865 when Krasniqi was expelled to Istanbul (the Ottoman capital) by the Ottomans, because of his participation in the unrests aimed against Mirdita chieftain Bib Doda. Ivanović had to send his reports to Garašanin through another Catholic priest, Jozef (Franc) Mauri, a Slovene Franciscan. Garašanin believed that it would be easier to establish cooperation with the Catholics in Albania (than Muslims), thus appointed Mauri as his envoy to the leaders of Mirdita tribe. Mauri explained to Mirdita chieftains that Serbia had no intention to forcefully convert Mirdita to Orthodox Christianity, but instead to help them to enjoy all rights they would have i.e. in Austro-Hungarian Empire. Besides Mauri who was active in Albania, the Serbian government engaged another envoy, Naum Sido, to actively work on gaining Albanian support for the Alliance. Sido was an Orthodox Albanian merchant from Debar (in western Macedonia) who frequently travelled to Istanbul.

Xhelal Pasha, a member of the Albanian noble Zogu family planned to organize an anti-Ottoman uprising in Albania and through Sido he informed the Russian ambassador in Istanbul about his plans. Sido worked for Nikolay Pavlovich Ignatyev, Russian ambassador in Istanbul who helped Garašanin to establish cooperation with Xhelal Pasha. Xhelal Pasha had great hopes to forge alliance with Serbia and refused the position of governor of Kurdistan offered to him by the Ottomans. Being under the pressure of the Ottoman police and facing substantial personal debts, Xhelal Pasha had to accept offered position in Anatolia and his task to suppress some revolt of highlander tribes. Because of this transfer the Serbian government lost contact with him.

The repressive policy of Ismail Pasha, Ottoman vali of the Sanjak of Scutari, additionally inspired northern Albanian tribes to participate in Serbia's anti-Ottoman activities. He imprisoned Miraši-Asi and Prek Staku, the chieftains of Hoti and Kelmendi tribes, who decided to cooperate with Serbia and accepted Mauri's idea as soon as they were released from the prison of Skadar. The chieftains of the northern Albanian tribes were so impatient to revolt against Ottomans that a sole visit of Serbian agent Vezenković sparked premature revolts. When Vezenković returned to Belgrade he urged the Serbian government to begin with the Albanian insurrection explaining that 10,000 Albanian rebels were prepared to revolt. At the end of 1867 a large Albanian revolt aimed against introduction of new taxes erupted in the regions of Peć, Prizren and Đakovica.

== Collapse and aftermath ==
After the murder of Prince Mihailo Obrenović in 1868, he was succeeded by his 13-year-old grandnephew Milan Obrenović. Without Mihailo's strong direction, the Balkan alliance network collapsed. In the following years only Montenegro was ready to renew already agreed measures, which resulted with a new alliance agreement in 1876.

Although this alliance was not successful, it was an indicator of a more aggressive period of Balkan nationalisms after the Berlin Congress (1878).

== Sources ==
- Britannica, Encyclopaedia (1983). The New Encyclopædia Britannica. Encyclopædia Britannica. ISBN 978-0-85229-400-0.
- Crampton, R. J. (1987). A Short History of Modern Bulgaria. CUP Archive. p. 16. ISBN 978-0-521-27323-7.
- Institut (1992), Историјски часопис 38 (1991): Historical Review 38 (1991), Istorijski institut, GGKEY:L4L0DZ56B5T
- Instituti (1924). Arhiv za arbanasku starinu, jezik i etnologiju. Instituti.
- Istorijski (1963). Pays yougoslaves au XIXème siècle. Istorijski institut.
- IZNI (1969). Istorija na makedonskiot narod. Skopje: Institut za nacionalna istorija.
- Jelavich, Barbara (2004). Russia's Balkan Entanglements, 1806–1914. Cambridge University Press. ISBN 978-0-521-52250-2.
- Jerotijević, Zoran; Radojević, Ljubiša (2007). Srbija između istoka i zapada: od Načertanija do 1914. Ljubostinja.
- Jovanović, Radoman (1977). Politickl odnosi Crne Gore I Srbije 1860–1878.
- Király, Béla K.; Rothenberg, Gunther Erich (1979). Special Topics and Generalizations on the 18th and 19th Centuries. Brooklyn College Press. ISBN 978-0-930888-04-6.
- Ljušić, Radoš (2005). Vlade Srbije: 1805–2005. Zavod za udžbenike i nastavna sredstva.
- MacKenzie, David (1985). Ilija Garašanin: Balkan Bismarck. East European Monographs. ISBN 978-0-88033-073-2.
- Maletić, Mihailo; Berisha, Anton (1973). Kosovo nekad i danas. Borba-Radna jedinica ekonomiska politika.
- Matica (1968). Zbornik za društvene nauke. Matica srpska.
- Petković, Ranko (1996). XX vek na Balkanu: Versaj, Jalta, Dejton. Službeni list SRJ.
- Poplazarov, Risto (1977). Osloboditelnite vooruženi borbi na makedonskiot narod vo periodot 1850–1878. Institut za nacionalna istorija.
- Reid, James J. (2000). Crisis of the Ottoman Empire: Prelude to Collapse 1839-1878. Franz Steiner Verlag. ISBN 978-3-515-07687-6.
- SANU (1993). Balcanica. Srpska Akademija Nauka i Umetnosti, Balkanološki Institut.
- SANU (1985). Posebna izdanja. Srpska akademija nauka i umetnosti.
- Škerović, Nikola P. (1952). Zapisnici sednica, 1862-1898. Serbia. Ministarski Savet.
- Society (1997). Serbian Studies. North American Society for Serbian Studies.
- Srejović, Dragoslav; Gavrilović, Slavko; Ćirković, Sima M. (1981). Istorija srpskog naroda: knj. Od najstarijih vremena do Maričke bitke (1371). Srpska književna zadruga.
- Stolić, Ana (2003). Ђорђе Симић: последњи српски дипломата XIX века. Istorijski institut.
- Popov, Čedomir (2000). Istorija srpske državnosti: Srbija i Crna Gora : novovekovne srpske države (in Serbian). Srpska akademija nauka i umetnosti.
- Slijepčević, Đoko M. (1983). Srpsko-arbanaški odnosi kroz vekove sa posebnim osvrtom na novije vreme. D. Slijepčević.
- Stojančević, Vladimir (1990a). Srbija i Albanci u XIX i početkom XX veka: ciklus predavanja 10–25. novembar 1987. Srpska akademija nauka i umetnosti.
- Stojančević, Vladimir (1990b). Srbija i oslobodilački pokret na Balkanskom poluostrvu u XIX veku. Zavod za udžbenike i nastavna sredstva.
- Stojančević, Vladimir (1991). Ilija Garašanin (1812–1874) : recueil des travaux du colloque scientifique organisé les 9 et 10 décembre 1987 a l'occasion du 175e anniversaire de sa naissance. SANU.
- Vučinić, Zoran (1996). Vojni savezi od Svete Alijanse do NATO. Vojska.
- Јакшић, Гргур; Вучковић, Војислав Ј (1963). Спољна политика Србије за владе кнеза Михаила: први балкански савез. Историјски институт.
- Popović, Bogdan Lj. (2010). Дипломатска историја Србије. Завод за Уџбенике.
- Popović, Vasilj (1940). Европа и српско питање у периоду ослобођења, 1804–1918. Геца Кон А.Д.
