= Euripus (Acarnania) =

Ancient Acarnanian town

Coordinates: 38°55′08″N 20°59′51″E

Epirus in antiquity

Euripus or Euripos (Ancient Greek: Εὔριπος) was a town in ancient Acarnania. It is known mainly through epigraphic evidence, including the appointment of theorodokoi of the place is mentioned towards the year 356/5 BCE to host theoroi of Epidaurus and also in another entry dated in the period 331/0-313 BCE to receive the theoroi of Nemea. It was a member of the Acarnanian League in the 3rd century BCE. It is also mentioned in the Periplus of Pseudo-Scylax.

Its site is located near the modern Rouga.

== See also ==
- List of cities in ancient Epirus
