= Amazonius =

Ancient Greek mythological epithet

Apollo Amazonius (Gr. Ἀμαζόνιος) was a cultic epithet of the Greek god Apollo, under which he was worshiped, and had a temple at Pyrrhichus in Laconia. The name was derived either from the belief that the mythological Amazons had penetrated into the Peloponnese region as far as Pyrrhichus, or that they themselves had founded Apollo's temple there.

The sole known reference to this etymology, in Pausanias' Description of Greece, is an oddity in the study of the Amazon mythological tradition. It is strange to hear of the Amazons in Laconia, a region in no way associated with the usual tale of their invasion of Attica. Pausanias suggests a large Amazonian army halted there, which is also at odds with the Boeotian mythological tradition which indicates only a few Amazons were separated from the host after their defeat by Theseus. Secondly, this Apollo is mentioned as a companion of the goddess Artemis, which was also unusual, and which has led some scholars to speculate that "Apollo Amazonius" indicates not the traditional Greek Apollo, but a distinctly non-Hellenic deity, possibly that of the more Asiatic peoples of Laconia, Lycia, Phrygia and Crete, prior to Hellenic colonization. The name "Apollo" across different regions of classical antiquity often referred to slightly different entities with varying attributes.
