= Greek–Serbian Alliance of 1867 =

1867 alliance between Greece and Serbia

Treaty of Vöslau
Treaty of Alliance and Friendship
- Signed: 26 August [O.S. 14 August] 1867
- Location: Vöslau, Austria-Hungary (now Austria)
- Negotiators: P. Zanos and I. Garašanin (primary)
- Parties: Greece; Serbia

The Treaty of Vöslau (Greek: Συνθήκη της Φεσλάου, Serbian: уговор о савезу у Феслау), a military alliance treaty between the Kingdom of Greece and the Principality of Serbia, was signed on 26 August 1867.

== Background ==
In the middle of the 19th century, most of the territory of Balkans was still part of the Ottoman Empire, with several newly established independent or autonomous entities like Serbia and Greece. All of them struggled to expand their influence and territory at Ottoman expense. Their intention was strongly opposed by Austria who opposed development of Balkan nations and revolutions in the Ottoman provinces of Europe (Rumelia). Napoleon III was the champion of the idea of Balkan nationalism and fostered Serbia and Greece to build alliances and undermine Ottoman influence in the region. France planned to resolve the Balkan Eastern Question through gathering of all Balkan Slavic people, including Bulgarians, around Serbia as their pillar. This was not only informally suggested by French diplomats since 1861, but also formally proposed in Saint Petersburg in 1867. The establishment of Balkan alliances was supported and aided by Russia because it corresponded with its policy of promoting Balkan unity.

The establishment of the Balkan alliance was campaigned by Prince Mihailo Obrenović of Serbia. To establish the First Balkan Alliance, the Principality of Serbia signed a series of contracts in the period 1866–68. The first contract was signed with Montenegro in 1866. The next contracts were signed in autumn of 1866 with the People's Party in Croatia-Slavonia, with the Bulgarian Revolutionary Secret Society in 1867, with Greece in 1867 and with Romania in 1868.

== Negotiations ==
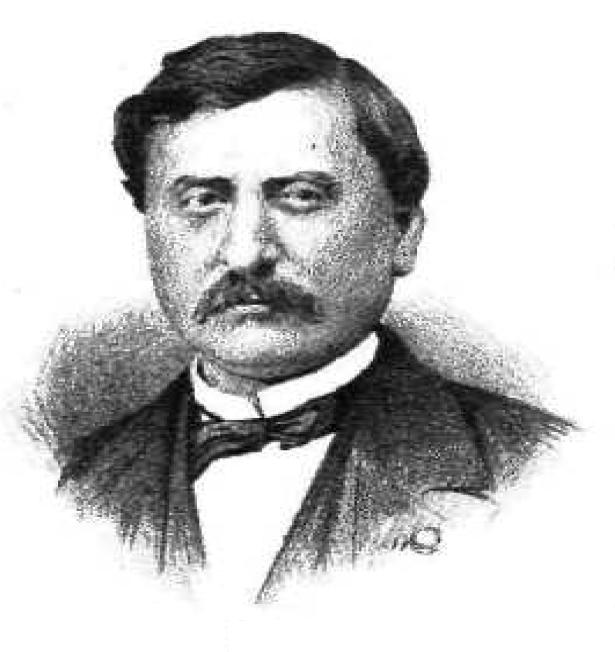
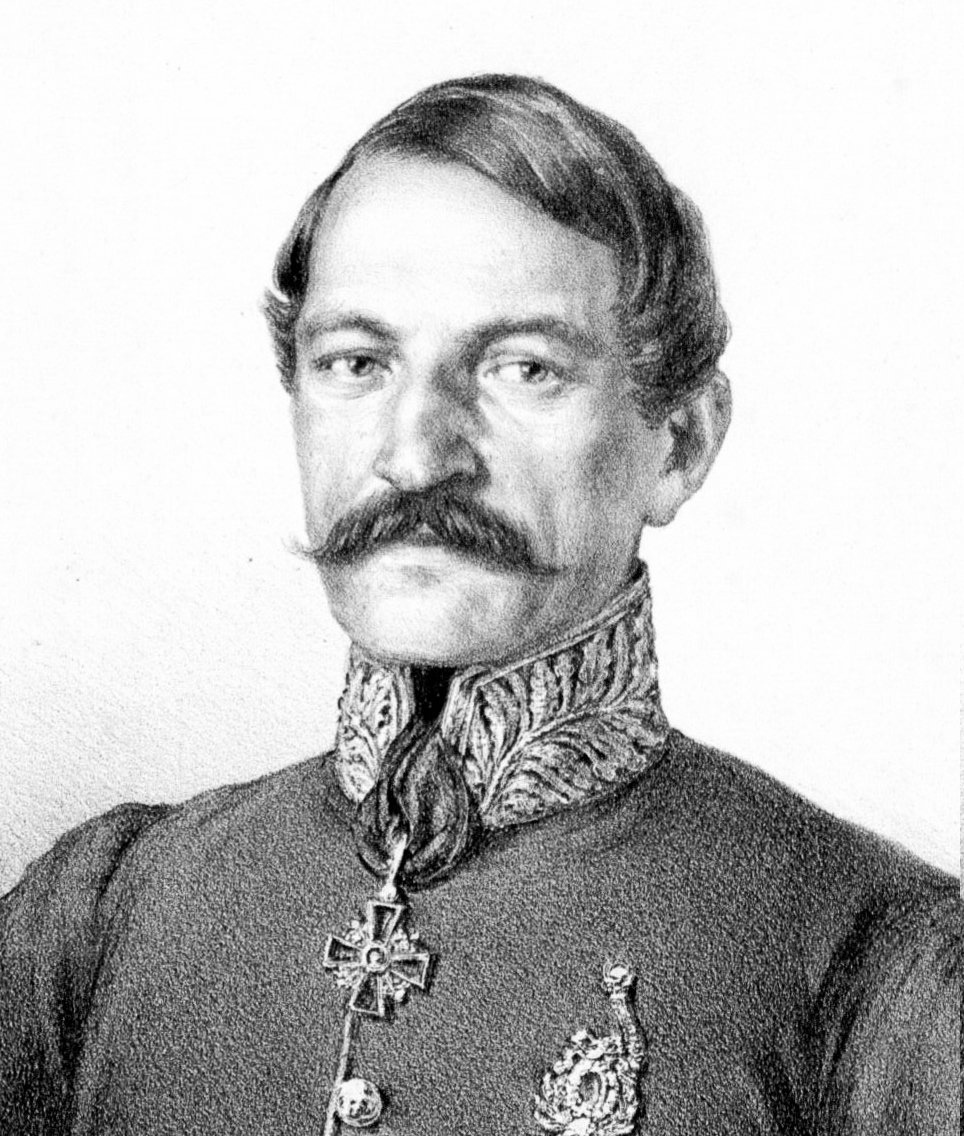
Petros Zanos and Ilija Garašanin

The Treaty of Alliance and Friendship (Serbian: Уговор о савезу и пријатељству) was signed between Serbia and Greece on 26 August [O.S. 14 August] 1867. The treaty had been negotiated by Greek minister Petros Zanos and Serbian ministers Jovan Ristić, Milan Petronijević and Ilija Garašanin (who had met with Zanos at the beginning). Earlier discussions had been organized in Vienna.

In the preamble, it is said that "the position of Christians in the East is unbearable" and that they need to free themselves. It is also stressed that the Ottoman Empire poses a threat, that it might attack the two countries, and that the alliance will forestall that danger.

It was proposed by Greek Foreign Minister Charilaos Trikoupis and was the first and only alliance signed between Greece and another country during the 19th century. It was also the first attempt at an alliance between Balkan nations against the Ottoman Empire. The two states agreed on the lands each of them would occupy following a successful war against the Ottomans.

=== Division of territories ===
The talks had been made difficult by questions on division of territories: the Greeks sought to establish only the minimum based on the population, equality of origin and historical traditions, whereas Prince Mihailo Obrenović sought the minimum of territory, assuming Bosnia and Herzegovina, and Old Serbia from the Drim to the Iskar. The Greeks, in that case, sought Thessaly, Epirus, and Macedonia between Thessaly and the Sea, Thrace and Balkan Mountains. Finally, the Greek proposal was accepted: Bosnia and Herzegovina to Serbia, Epirus and Thessaly to Greece. The possibility of a Balkan alliance was predicted, and the establishment of it also as a principle for a national self-determination in the Near East. A special act included the rights of both sides, that if they were unable to realize the minimum of annexations in Article 4 (Bosnia and Herzegovina, Epirus and Thessaly), they would seek compensation in other neighboring provinces of the Ottoman Empire, based on mutual origin of the population.

== Ratification ==
On 22 January [O.S. 10 January] 1868, the ratifications were exchanged. The Serbian delegate, artillery lieutenant colonel Franjo Zah, had arrived in Athens on 16 November [O.S. 4 November] 1868. On 28 February [O.S. 16 February] 1868 the military convention on war operations against the Ottoman Empire was signed between Serbia and Greece by signatories Zah and major Nikolaos Zanos of the Greek military command.

The treaty never came into effect, as Prince Mihailo was murdered soon afterwards, on 10 June 1868.

== See also ==
- Greece–Serbia relations
- Greek–Serbian Alliance of 1913
- History of modern Greece
- History of modern Serbia

== Sources ==
- Istorijski institut u Beogradu (1992). Posebna izdanja. Vol. 27. Izdanje Istorijskog Instituta. p. 133.
- Jelavich, Barbara (2004). Russia's Balkan Entanglements, 1806–1914. Cambridge University Press. ISBN 978-0-521-52250-2.
- Laskaris, S. (1947). Diplomatic History of Greece (1821-1914). Athens. pp. 117–124.
- Lopičić, Đorđe N. (2007). Konzularni odnosi Srbije: (1804-1918). Zavod za udžbenike. ISBN 978-86-17-34399-4.
- Popović, Bogdan; Skerlić, Jovan (1928). Srpski književni glasnik. Vol. 23–24. p. 77.
- Popović, Bogdan Lj. (2010). Дипломатска историја Србије. Завод за Уџбенике. ISBN 9788617169754.
- Popović, Vasilj (1940). Европа и српско питање у периоду ослобођења, 1804–1918. Геца Кон А.Д.
- Reid, James J. (2000). Crisis of the Ottoman Empire: Prelude to Collapse 1839-1878. Franz Steiner Verlag. ISBN 978-3-515-07687-6.
- Vojvodić, Vaso (1994). U duhu Garašaninovih ideja: Srbija i neoslobođeno Srpstvo : 1868-1876. Prosveta. p. 334. ISBN 9788607007653.
