= Phlygonium =

City in ancient Phocis

Coordinates: 38°28′29″N 22°44′26″E

Phlygonium or Phlygonion (Ancient Greek: Φλυγόνιον) was a city of ancient Phocis destroyed by Philip II of Macedon at the end of the Phocian War (346 BCE). Pliny the Elder calls it Phlygone, and erroneously represents it as a city of Boeotia.

Its site is tentatively located at the Palaiokastro (old castle) near Ano Tseresi.
