= Congress at the Isthmus of Corinth =

481 BC congress of Greek city states

The Congress at the Isthmus of Corinth took place in 481 BC under the presidency of Sparta, and brought together a number of the Greek city states. The Congress agreed to the end of the war between Athens and Aegina. The Congress also discussed the threat from the Persians. Athens was unwilling to place her forces under Sparta and its King Leonidas.

Gelon, tyrant of Syracuse, wanted high command, but Sparta and Athens refused. However, during the Congress, Gelon had to withdraw due to Carthage's plans to invade Sicily.

Finally, Athenian archon and political leader, Themistocles, agreed that Athens' navy serve under a Spartan admiral to achieve the unity of the Greek states. In an environment where the Greeks were continually breaking into factions within cities and creating rivalries between cities, Themistocles' actions were advanced and far-sighted.

Nevertheless, Thebes and Thessaly were unwilling to support Athens against the Persians, and Crete decided to remain neutral.

== See also ==
- Second Persian invasion of Greece
- League of Corinth
