= Geronthres =

Geronthres Γερόνθρες
- Municipal unit
- Location within the regional unit

- Location within Greece
- Coordinates: 36°59′N 22°42′E
- Country: Greece
- Administrative region: Peloponnese
- Regional unit: Laconia
- Municipality: Evrotas

Area
  - Municipal unit: 236.8 km^{2} (91.4 sq mi)
- Elevation: 15 m (49 ft)

Population (2021)
  - Municipal unit: 1,664
  - Municipal unit density: 7.027/km^{2} (18.20/sq mi)
- Time zone: UTC+2 (EET)
  - Summer (DST): UTC+3 (EEST)
- Postal code: 230 58
- Area code: 27310
- Vehicle registration: ΑΚ

Geronthres (Greek: Γερόνθρες), named after ancient Geronthrae, is a former municipality in Laconia, Peloponnese, Greece. Since the 2011 local government reform it is part of the municipality Evrotas, of which it is a municipal unit. The municipal unit has an area of 236.780 km^{2}. The seat of administration was the village Geraki Laconias. The municipal population is approx. 1,700.

Dutch excavations (University of Amsterdam) point to first settlement of the acropolis hill in the (Final) Neolithic period. In the Early Helladic period the site must have contained an administrative centre of some kind, judged by the sealing fragments that can be compared by those found in Lerna. Habitation continued towards the end of the Middle Helladic period, but no Mycenaean finds have been found yet. First signs of renewed habitation date from the Iron Age. The site is left again in the Roman period.

Close to Geraki is the medieval fortress after which the village is named, and which formed the seat of the Barony of Geraki in the Frankish Principality of Achaea. In the village itself are several Byzantine-era churches.

== Historical population ==
Year	Geraki	Geronthres
1981	1,644	-
1991	1,381	2,034
2001	1,341	1,959
2011	1,252	1,793
2021	1,190	1,664
