= Pedieis =

Town in Greece, destroyed in 480 BC

Coordinates: 38°37′35″N 22°40′18″E

Pedieis (Ancient Greek: Πεδιεῖς or Πεδιέας) was one of the Phocian towns destroyed by Xerxes I during the Greco-Persian Wars (in 480 BCE). From the order in which it stands in the enumeration of Herodotus, it appears to have stood near the Cephissus, in some part of the plain between Tithorea and Elateia. It is enumerated among the towns in Phocis whose territory was sacked n 395 BCE by the Boeotians.

The site of Pedieis is tentatively associated with a location called Palaia Phiva.
