= Troneia =

Former town and polis in ancient Phocis

Troneia (Ancient Greek: Τρώνεια) or, in Stephanus of Byzantium's works, Groneia (Γρώνεια), was a town and polis (city-state) of ancient Phocis.

It is mentioned in several epigraphs among which stand out an inscription of the year 322 BCE (in this case the allusion to Troneia is not certain) and a decree of manumission of the 2nd century BCE at Delphi where Troneia is cited as the place of origin of a slave. It is related to the toponym Tronis (Τρωνίς), which should be the name of its territory, which Pausanias mentions as within the domains of Daulis indicating that a heroon was located there.

Some authors identify it with the city called Patronis (Πατρωνίς) by Plutarch, but others reject that identification.

It has been suggested that Tronia could have been located in Agias Marina, which is located west of Daulis, or in Kato Tseresi, which is located south of Daulis. The Agias Marina site has remains including of a wall. Mogens Herman Hansen accepts the identity of Troneia with Patronis, and the Agias Marina location (38°33′28″N 22°41′52″E) as the more likely.
