= Ambrysus (Phocis) =

Coordinates: 38°25′42″N 22°40′03″E

Ambrysus or Ambrysos (Ancient Greek: Ἄμβρυσος) or Ambrosus or Ambrosos (Ἄμβροσσος) or Amphrysus or Amphrysos (Ἄμφρυσος) was a town of ancient Phocis, situated 60 stadia from Stiris, northeast of Anticyra, at the southern foot of Mount Cirphis (not at the foot of Parnassus, as Pausanias states), and in a fertile valley, producing abundance of wine and the coccus, or kermes berry, used to dye scarlet. It was located in the southern part of Phocis, bordering on the territory of Parapotamii. It was destroyed by order of the Amphictyons, but was rebuilt and fortified by the Thebans with a double wall, in their war against Philip II of Macedon, who had during the Third Sacred War taken Ambrysus among other cities in Phocis (346 BCE). In c. 228-224 BCE, it was attacked by the Aetolians, like the city of Daulis. Its fortifications were considered by Pausanias the strongest in Greece, next to those of Messene. It was taken by the Romans in the Second Macedonian War, 198 BCE. During the visit of Pausanias, in the second century, the town had an agora of small size and statues of stone, most of which were broken.

The site of Ambrysus is located near the modern village of Distomo (Distomon).
