= Derium =

Coordinates: 38°38′35″N 21°11′10″E

Derium or Derion (Ancient Greek: Δήριον) was a town of ancient Acarnania. The city is attested by epigraphic Greek inscriptions of the 4th and 3rd centuries BCE, among which are a record of theorodokoi receiving theoroi of Nemea dated to 331/0–313 BCE, an inscription in the sanctuary of Asclepius at Epidaurus where proxenos is named as a citizen of Derium, and a treaty between the Ateolians and Acarnanians of the 3rd century BCE. The inhabitants of Derium are also mentioned by Diodorus, which indicates that towards the year 314 BCE, they settled in Agrinium on the advice of Cassander.

Its site is located near the modern Skourtou.
