= Panopeus =

Ancient Greek city and fortress

Coordinates: 38°29′44″N 22°47′39″E

Panopeus (Πανοπεύς), or Phanoteus (the name is given in a variety of forms in the ancient sources), was a Greek town of ancient Phocis, near the frontier of Boeotia, and on the road from Daulis to Chaeronea. Pausanias said that Panopeus was 20 stadia from Chaeronea and 7 from Daulis; but the latter number is almost certainly a mistake. The ruins at the village of Agios Vlasios (or Aio Vlasi) (Ἅγιος Βλάσις), which are clearly those of Panopeus, are about 20 stadia distant from Chaeronea, but as much as 27 stadia distant from Daulis.

Panopeus was a very ancient town, which according to Greek mythology was originally inhabited by the Phlegyae. Strabo relates that it was founded by Panopeus. Homer lists Panopeus in the Catalogue of Ships in the Iliad. Schedius, king of Panopeus, and his brother, were the leaders of the Phocians in the Trojan War. Panopeus was also celebrated for the grave of Tityos, who was slain by Apollo and Artemis at this place, because he attempted to rape their mother Leto on her way to Delphi.

Panopeus was destroyed in the Greco-Persian Wars by Xerxes in 480 BCE. In 395 BCE, it's territory was sacked by the Boeotians, who tried to raid the city but could only take the suburbs by force. In 346 BCE, it was destroyed again by Philip II of Macedon at the close of the Third Sacred War. It was taken by the Romans in 198 BCE, on the first attack; and was destroyed for the third time in the campaign between Sulla and Archelaus, the general of Mithridates VI of Pontus, in the 1st century BCE.

Pausanias said that the city was 7 stadia in circumference, but in his time the place only consisted of a few huts situated on the side of a river. Up until at least the 19th century there were still considerable remains of the ancient walls on the rocky heights above Agios Vlasios. The masonry is of different periods, as one might expect given the repeated destruction of the city. There are no longer any remains of the tomb of Tityos, which, according to Pausanias, was 1/3 of a stade in circumference, and stood on the side of the river. Pausanias also mentions on the side of the Sacred Way a building of unbaked bricks, containing a statue of the Pentelic marble, which was supposed to be intended either for Prometheus or Asclepius. It was believed by some that Prometheus made the human race out of the sand-colored rocks in the vicinity of this town, and that they still carried the smell of human flesh.
