= Bulis (Phocis) =

Town of ancient Phocis

Coordinates: 38°17′N 22°49′E

Bulis or Boulis (Ancient Greek: Βοῦλις) or Bulea or Bouleia (Βούλεια) was a town of ancient Phocis, on the frontiers of Boeotia, situated upon a hill, and distant 7 stadia from the Crissaean Gulf, 80 stadia from Thisbe, and 100 from Anticyra. It was founded by the Dorians under Bulon (Βούλων), and for this reason appears to have belonged to neither the Phocian nor the Boeotian Confederacy. Pausanias, at least, did not regard it as a Phocian town, since he describes it as bordering upon Phocis. But Stephanus of Byzantium, Pliny the Elder, and Ptolemy all assign it to Phocis. Near Phocis there flowed into the sea a torrent called Heracleius, and there was also a fountain named Saunium. In the time of Pausanias more than half the population was employed in fishing for the murex, which yielded the purple dye. Pausanias noted various religious buildings at Bulis: sanctuaries of Artemis and Dionysus, with wooden images, although he also mentioned that a divinity named Megisto was worshiped, which could be an epithet of Zeus. The harbour of Bulis, which Pausanias describes as distant 7 stadia from the city, is called Mychus (Μυχός) by Strabo.

The site of Bulis is near the modern village of Zalitza.
