= Milan Petronijević =

Serbian politician and diplomat

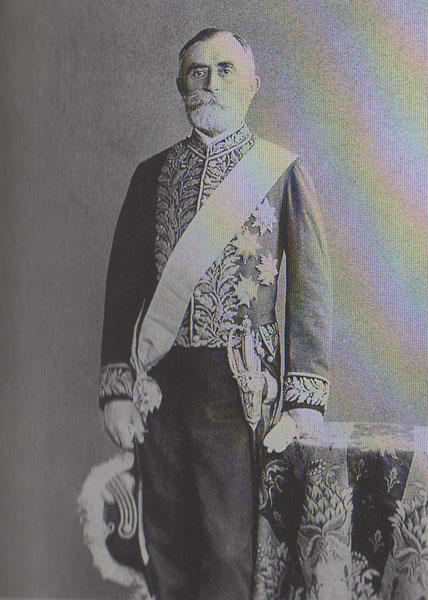

Personal details
- Born: 11 November 1831 Jagodina, Principality of Serbia
- Died: 14 October 1914 (aged 82) Vrnjačka Banja, Kingdom of Serbia
- Occupation: politician, diplomat

Milan Petronijević (Serbian Cyrillic: Милан Петронијевић; 11 November 1831 — 14 October 1914) was a Serbian politician and diplomat who served as the Minister of Foreign Affairs from 1867 to 1868.

== Biography ==
Petronijević was born in 1831 in Jagodina which at that time was part of the Principality of Serbia. His father Avram Petronijević was a Prime Minister and the Minister of Foreign Affairs.

He started off his diplomatic career as an Ambassador of Serbia to the Ottoman Empire from 1854 to 1861. Later, he was the President of the Theater Board from 9 December 1864 to 13 July 1868. He was a representative of the Minister of Foreign Affairs Jovan Ristić from 3 to 21 November 1867.

On 21 November 1867, he got appointed Minister of Foreign Affairs and served until 21 June 1868. After leaving this position, all of his further engagements were in diplomacy as he was an Ambassador of Serbia in Bucharest from 1873 to 1880, Ambassador in Berlin from 1880 to 1888, Ambassador in Vienna from 1889 to 1890 and an Ambassador in St. Petersburg from 1890 to 1897.

He also served as the President of the State Council.

== Personal life ==
In 1855, Petronijević married Cleopatra, the daughter of the Prince of Serbia Alexander Karađorđević. After Cleopatra's unexpected death, he married for the second time, this time with Jelisaveta Cukić, daughter of Petar Lazarević Cukić and granddaughter of Voivode Pavle Cukić by her father, and Voivode Petar Nikolajević Moler by mother, the sister of Kosta Cukić. Milan Petronijević and Jelisaveta Petronijević (1837-1915) had a son, Miloš and two daughters.

== Awards ==
- Order of Saint Vladimir, 2nd degree

Government offices
Preceded by Milenko Vesnić	Minister of Justice; 1907-1908	Succeeded by Milovan Milovanović
Preceded by Dragoljub Aranđelović	Minister of Justice; 1912	Succeeded by Marko Đuričić
Preceded by Milovan Milovanović	Prime Minister of Serbia; 1912	Succeeded by Nikola Pašić
Preceded by Milovan Milovanović	Minister of Foreign Affairs; 1912	Succeeded by Jovan Jovanović Pižon
