= Epidaurus Limera =

Human settlement in Greece

Coordinates: 36°43′53″N 23°01′35″E

Epidaurus Limera or Epidauros Limera (Ancient Greek: Ἐπίδαυρος ἡ Λιμηρά) was a town on the eastern coast of ancient Laconia, situated on Cape Maleas at the head of a spacious bay. It was a colony from Epidaurus in Argolis, and is said to have been built in consequence of an intimation from Asclepius, when an Epidaurian ship touched here on its way to Cos. Its foundation probably belongs to the time when the whole of the eastern coast of Laconia, as far as the promontory of Cape Maleas, acknowledged the supremacy of Argos.

The epithet Limera was considered by the best ancient critics to be given to the town on account of the excellence of its harbours, though other explanations were proposed of the word. Pausanias describes the town as situated on a height not far from the sea. He mentions among its public buildings temples of Aphrodite and Asclepius, a temple of Athena on the acropolis, and a temple of Zeus Soter in front of the harbour.

South of Epidaurus, Pausanias mentions a promontory (ἄκρα) extending into the sea, called Minoa. This promontory is now an island, connected with the mainland by a bridge of 14 small arches; it is not improbable that it was originally part of the mainland, and afterwards separated from it.

== Archaeology ==
The ruins of Epidaurus are situated at the spot now called Palaia Monemvasia (Old Monemvasia). William Martin Leake, who visited in the 19th century wrote that the walls, both of the acropolis and town, were traceable all round; and in some places, particularly towards the sea, they remained to more than half their original height. The town formed a sort of semicircle on the southern side of the citadel. The towers were some of the smallest he had ever seen in Hellenic fortresses; the faces ten feet (3.0 m), the flanks twelve (4 m): the whole circumference of the place was less than three-quarters mile (1.2 km). The town was divided into two separate parts by a wall; thus making, with the citadel, three interior divisions. On the acropolis there was a level space, which was separated from the remaining part of it by a little insulated rock, excavated for the foundations of a wall. Leake took this platform to have been the position of the temple of Athena. On the site of the lower town, towards the sea front, there were two terrace walls, one of which was a perfect specimen of the second order of Hellenic masonry. Upon these terraces may have stood the temples of Aphrodite and Asclepius. There were, likewise, some remains of a modern town within the ancient enclosure; namely, houses, churches, and a tower of the lower ages. The harbour of Zeus Soter had entirely disappeared, but this is not surprising, as it must have been artificial; but there are two harbours, one at either extremity of the bay, the northern called that of Kremídhi, and the southern that of Monemvasia.

Leake also noted, about a one-third mile (0.54 km) south of the ruins of Epidaurus, near the sea, a deep pool of fresh water, surrounded with reeds, about 100 yards (91 m) long and 30 yards (27 m) broad, which he observed was probably the "lake of Ino, small and deep," mentioned by Pausanias as 2 stadia from the altars of Asclepius, erected to commemorate the spot where the sacred serpent disappeared in the ground, after landing from the Epidaurian ship on its way to Cos.

== History ==
Epidaurus is rarely mentioned in history. Its territory was ravaged by the Athenians in the Peloponnesian War. In the time of Strabo there appears to have been a fortress on the promontory Minoa, since he calls it a φρούριον. Pausanias mentions Epidaurus Limera as one of the Eleuthero-Laconian towns. Ptolemy enumerates, as separate places, Minoa, the harbour of Zeus Soter, and Epidaurus. In the Middle Ages the inhabitants of Epidaurus abandoned their ancient town, and built a new one on Minoa – which they now, for greater security, probably, converted for the first time into an island. To their new town, because it was accessible by only one way, they gave the name of Monemvasia or Monembasia, which was corrupted by the Franks into Malvasia. In the Middle Ages it was the most important Greek town in the Morea, and continued purely Greek in its language and customs for many centuries.
