= Pyrrhichus =

Coordinates: 36°39′33″N 22°25′59″E

Pyrrhichus or Pyrrhichos (Ancient Greek: Πύρριχος) was a town of ancient Laconia, situated about the centre of the promontory ending in Cape Taenarum, and distant 40 stadia from the river Scyras. According to some it derived its name from Pyrrhus, the son of Achilles, according to others from Pyrrhichus, one of the Curetes. Silenus was also said to have been brought up here. It contained temples of Artemis Astrateia and of Apollo Amazonius – the two surnames referring to the tradition that the Amazons did not proceed further than this place. There was also a well in the agora. The ruins of this town have been discovered by the French Commission near the village of Kavalos near Kotronas, where they found the well of which Pausanias speaks, the torso of a female statue, the remains of baths, and several Roman ruins.

Its site is located near the modern Kotronas.
