= Koinon =

League of poleis in ancient Greece

Koinon κοινόν συμμαχῶν (koinon symmachon, "League of the Allies", where the name of the league appears in the genitive case in place of "allies."
- Poleis
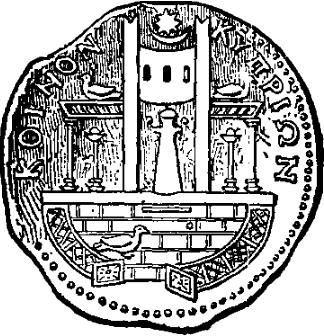
- A coin of the Cypriot League. The name, Koinon Kypriōn, is embossed around the upper perimeter.
- Etymology: "common thing" for koinon, "co-combatantship" for symmachia.
- Combined territory of the constituent poleis: Two words, koinon followed by the genitive of a key word, such as the ethnic, the name of the place of creation, or the name of the chief state.

Government
  - Type: League
  - Body: Koinon

Koinon (Greek: Κοινόν, pl. Κοινά, Koina), meaning "common thing", in the sense of "public", had many applications, some societal, some governmental. An abstract noun formed from the neuter of the adjective, koinos, "common", the koinon could mean any sort of organization. (Note: "For koinon was used to designate all kinds of associations of a number of individuals, from small private clubs to entire states, ....") It had more than one meaning in the governmental sense.

== Polis ==
One was a polis or its politeia, Latin res publica, "the public thing", or "commonwealth", as seen in the Athenian model. A polis, by definition, is a government of common concern rather than private, making it a republic. The polis also functioned as a federal state with a politeia, or "constitution", which established citizenship. Citizens managed the state through elected magistracies and the assembly. These institutions, claiming supreme political power, directly performed their constitutional duties across executive, judicial, or legislative domains. While political theory had not yet conceptualized the three-branch system common in modern republics, the functions existed in various forms, including the military, law courts, and economic regulation.

== Alliance ==
The focus of this article is on a concept that extends beyond the individual polis: the formation of alliances among various poleis. Groups of poleis with shared interests, such as building a strong military for offense or defense, might form alliances, like the Ionians who defended the Greek coast of Anatolia against incoming Iranians. In such cases, the concept of "the public thing" or commonwealth would be extended to the alliance itself. To differentiate the alliance from a single republic, an ethnic name might be used, such as "the alliance of the Ionians."

The alliance was then "the common thing of the allies," as it is in Isocrates 14.21, where the allies are symmachoi ("fighters in common,"), and the alliance is a symmachia. The league was not strictly a "federation," as the member states guarded their independence jealously. Even so, in the Delian League, the most powerful state, Athens, managed to control the other states to such a degree as now to be called "the Athenian Empire."

As the government of a league, a koinon encompassed functions like defense, diplomacy, economics, and religious practices among its member states. This association more closely resembled a confederation rather than a federal union, like the one Alexander created. Members of the alliance primarily contributed taxes, men, and equipment, rather than directly managing or issuing binding commands.

Some examples follow. In Epirus itself there had in ancient times existed the Koinon of the Molossians. There was a Lacedaemonian League (κοινὸν τῶν Λακεδαιμονίων), centered on Sparta and its old dominions for a period under Roman rule, and a Koinon of the Macedonians, also under Roman rule. In modern Greek history, during the Greek War of Independence, a local self-government termed Koinon was set up in the islands of Hydra, Spetses and Psara.

== See also ==
- Symmachia (alliance)
- List of ancient Greek alliances
