= Geronthrae =

Town of ancient Laconia

Coordinates: 36°59′32″N 22°42′25″E

Geronthrae or Geronthrai (Ancient Greek: Γερόνθραι), or Geranthrae or Geranthrai (Γεράνθραι), also written as Gerenthrae or Gerenthrai (Γερένθραι), was a town of ancient Laconia, situated in a commanding position upon the southwestern face of the mountain above the plain of the Eurotas. We learn from Pausanias that Geronthrae possessed a temple and grove of Ares, to whom a yearly festival was celebrated, from which women were excluded. Around the agora there were fountains of potable water. On the acropolis stood a temple of Apollo.

Geronthrae was one of the ancient Achaean cities which resisted for a long time the Dorian conquerors. It was at length taken and colonised by the Spartans, along with Amyclae and Pharis. In the time of the Roman Empire it belonged to the Eleuthero-Lacones. At the beginning of the 4th century CE it must have been a market-town of some importance, since a Greek translation of the edict of Diocletian, "De Pretiis Rerum Venalium", has been discovered at Geraki. In the Middle Ages it was the seat of a bishopric, and one of the most important places in the valley of the Eurotas.

Its site is located near the modern Geraki. On the northern side of the summit of the citadel are the remains of a very ancient wall: the position of the agora is indicated by the fountains of water lower down the hill.
