= Teuthrone =

Coordinates: 36°37′16″N 22°29′21″E

Teuthrone (Ancient Greek: Τευθρώνη) was a town in Ancient Greece on the Peloponnese in the region of ancient Laconia on the eastern shore of the Mani Peninsula. It was on the Laconian Gulf, some 150 stadia from Cape Matapan—called Tenairon or Tenaro by the ancient Greeks and Romans.

The ruins of Teuthrone are near the modern village of Kotronas, in the municipality of East Mani, and its citadel occupied a small peninsula called Skopos, Skopia or Skopópolis.

According to ancient tradition, Teuthrone was founded by an Athenian figure named Teuthras (Τεύθρας). Its patron deity was Artemis Issoria and it featured a fountain called Naia (Ναΐα).

Following the Roman conquest of Greece in c. 21 BCE, Teuthrone joined the League of Free Laconians.

== Bibliography ==
- Moschou, Lidas; Moschou, Taki (1983). "Τὸ ἀρχαῖο φρούριο τῆς Τευθρώνης". Ἀρχαιολογικὴ Ἐφημερις. 1981: 10–22.
