= Charadra (Phocis) =

City of ancient Phocis

Coordinates: 38°39′17″N 22°28′12″E

Charadra (Ancient Greek: Χαράδρα) was a city of ancient Phocis, and one of the Phocian towns destroyed by Xerxes I in 480 BCE during the Greco-Persian Wars. Pausanias describes Charadra as situated 20 stadia from Lilaea, upon a lofty and precipitous rock. He further states that the inhabitants suffered from a scarcity of water, which they obtained from the torrent Charadrus, a tributary of the Cephissus, distant three stadia from the town. Situated in the agora of the town, Pausanias noted altars of heroes; some thought they were of the Dioscuri, others thought they were of local heroes.

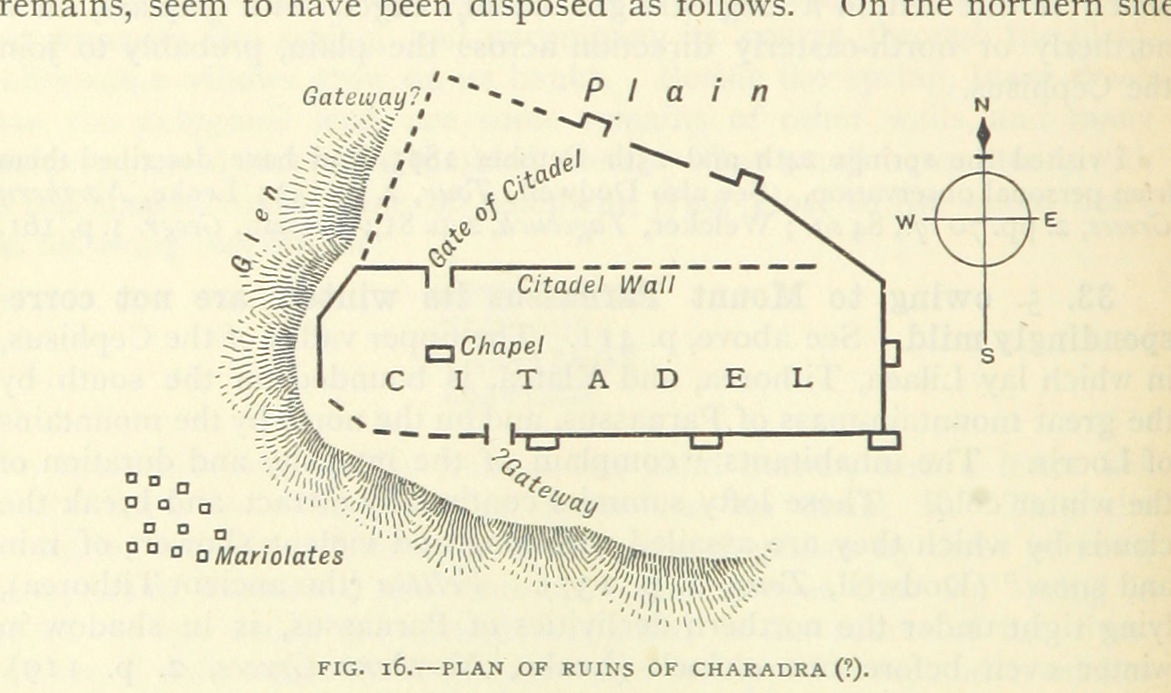

The site of Charadra is near modern Mariolata (Mariolates). It was rebuilt after the Third Sacred War and some remains of its gates and walls have been found.
