= Daulis =

Town of ancient Phocis

Coordinates: 38°30′24″N 22°43′45″E

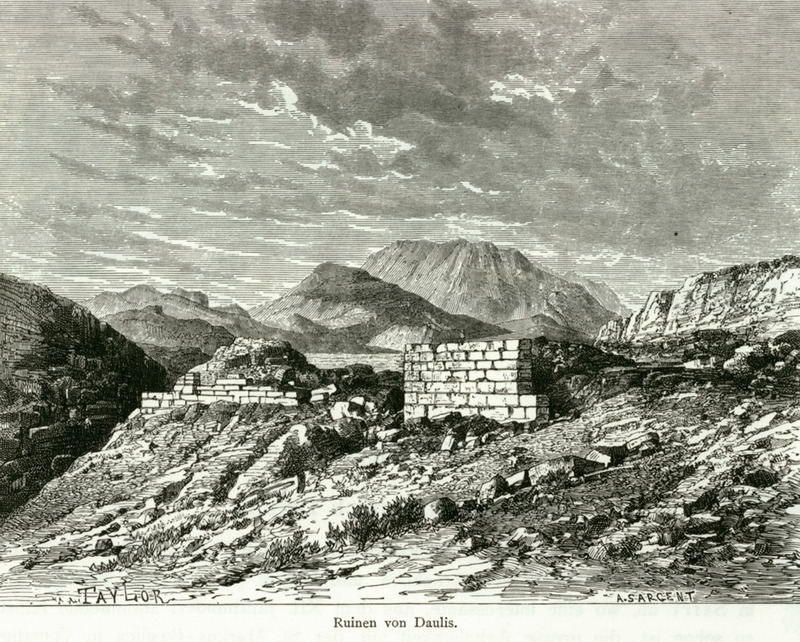
Ruins of Daulis as of 1887.

Daulis (Ancient Greek: Δαυλίς), at a later time Daulia (Δαυλία), and also Daulium or Daulion (Δαύλιον), was a town of ancient Phocis, near the frontiers of Boeotia, and on the road from Orchomenus and Chaeroneia to Delphi.

== Overview ==
It is said to have derived its name from the woody character of the district, since δαυλός was used by the inhabitants instead of δαλός, while others sought for the origin of the name in the mythical nymph Daulis, a daughter of Cephissus. Daulis is mentioned by Homer as a Phocian town along with Crissa and Panopeus in the Catalogue of Ships in the Iliad. It is celebrated in mythology as the residence of the Thracian king, Tereus, who married Procne, the daughter of Pandion, king of ancient Athens, and as the scene of those horrible deeds in consequence of which Procne was changed into a swallow, and her sister Philomela into a nightingale. Hence the latter was called by the poets the Daulian bird. The woody district round the town is still a favourite haunt of the nightingale.

During the Greco-Persian Wars, Daulis was destroyed by the Persians in the invasion of Xerxes I (480 BCE). Its territory was sacked by the Boeotians, who however were unsuccessful in their attempt to assault the city. It was destroyed a second time by Philip II of Macedon, at the end of the Third Sacred War (346 BCE); but it was subsequently rebuilt, and is mentioned in later times as a town almost impregnable in consequence of its situation upon a lofty hill. In c. 228-224 BCE, Daulis was attacked by the Aetolians, like the city of Ambrysus. In 198 BCE, the Romans besieged Daulis but, not being able to take it by direct assault since the city had a very strong position on the top of a hill, they had to occupy it by a stratagem. Pausanias relates that the inhabitants of Daulis were few in number, but surpassed all the other Phocians in stature and strength. The only building in the town mentioned by him was a temple of Athena; but in the neighbourhood he speaks of a district called Tronis, in which was the chapel of a hero (heroon) called the Archegetes.

The name of Daulis is still preserved in that of the modern village of Davleia, situated in a narrow valley, through which flows a branch of the Cephissus (Platania). The walls of the acropolis may be traced on the summit of the height rising opposite the modern village, and connected with the foot of Parnassus by a narrow isthmus. Within the enclosure is an ancient church of St. Theodore. Here an inscription has been found in which mention is made of the worship of Athena Polias and of Serapis. Before the door of the church in the modern village is another ancient inscription, of considerable length, recording an arbitration made at Chaeroneia in the reign of Hadrian, concerning certain property in Daulis. In this inscription we read of "a road leading to the Archagetes," which is evidently the chapel of the hero spoken of by Pausanias. One of the plots of land in the inscription is called Platanus, from which probably comes the name of the river Platania.

== Bishopric ==
Daulis was, at the end of antiquity, the seat of a bishopric. It was created late, perhaps to replace that of Elateia, at a time when the Greeks retreated to the south, due to the Slavic invasion. This bishopric was suffragan of Athens.

No longer a resident bishop of the Roman Catholic Church, Daulis remains a titular see.
