= Acriae =

Ancient city in Laconia

Coordinates: 36°47′39″N 22°47′07″E

Acriae or Akriai (Ancient Greek: Ἀκριαί), or Acraeae or Akraiai (Ἀκραῖαι), or Acreia or Akreia (Ἄκρεια), also spelled Acraea, was a town of ancient Laconia, on the eastern side of the Laconian bay, 30 stadia south of Helos. Strabo describes the Eurotas as flowing into the sea between Acriae and Gythium. Acriae possessed a sanctuary and a statue of the mother of the gods, which was said by the inhabitants of the town to be the most ancient in the Peloponnesus. William Martin Leake was unable to discover any remains of Acriae; the French expedition place its ruins at the harbour of Kokinio.

Its site is located near the modern Kokkinia.
