= Palaea =

Palaea may refer to:

- Pleiae, a town of ancient Laconia, Greece
- Philaea, a town of ancient Cilicia, Asia Minor, now in Turkey
- Palaia Fokaia, former community and a seaside town in East Attica, Greece
- Palaea Historica, a ninth-century Byzantine chronicle

== See also ==
- Palaia (disambiguation)
