= Palaia (disambiguation) =

Palaia is a comune (municipality) in the province of Pisa in the Italian region Tuscany.

Palaia may also refer to:

== Places ==
- Palaia Fokaia, former community and a seaside town in East Attica, Greece
- Palaia (Cilicia), a town of ancient Cilicia, Asia Minor, now in Turkey
- Palaia (Laconia), a town of ancient Laconia, Greece

== Persons ==
- Joseph A. Palaia (1927–2016), American politician
- Liliana Palaia Pérez (born 1951), Spanish architect and painter

== Animals ==
- Palaia pulchra a skink in the genus Palaia
