= Kouvaras =

Kouvaras Κουβαράς
- Municipal unit
- Location within the regional unit

- Location within Greece
- Coordinates: 37°50′N 23°58′E
- Country: Greece
- Administrative region: Attica
- Regional unit: East Attica
- Municipality: Saronikos

Area
  - Municipal unit: 24.371 km^{2} (9.410 sq mi)
- Elevation: 209 m (686 ft)

Population (2021)
  - Municipal unit: 1,932
  - Municipal unit density: 79.27/km^{2} (205.3/sq mi)
- Time zone: UTC+2 (EET)
  - Summer (DST): UTC+3 (EEST)
- Postal code: 190 03
- Area code: 22910
- Vehicle registration: Z
- Website: www.koinotita-kouvara.gr

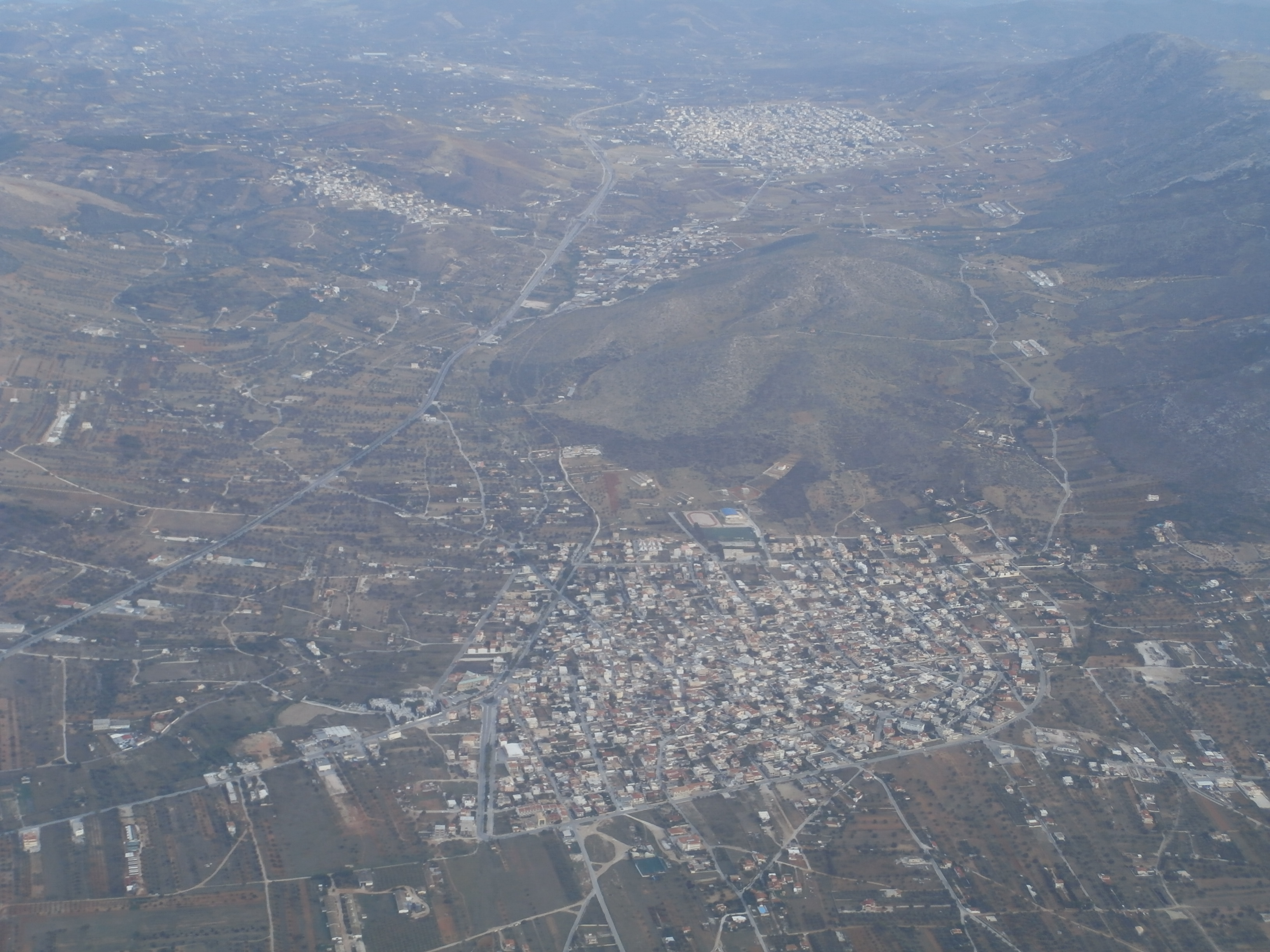
Aerial view of Kalivia Thorikou, Kouvaras and Keratea as seen from the northwest

Kouvaras (Greek: Κουβαράς) is a village and a former community in East Attica, Greece. Since the 2011 local government reform it is part of the municipality Saronikos, of which it is a municipal unit. The municipal unit has an area of 24.371 km^{2}.

== Geography ==
Kouvaras is situated in the southeastern part of the Attica peninsula. There are several low mountains around Kouvaras, including Mount Paneion to its southwest and Merenta to its north. It is 2 km north of Keratea, 4 km southeast of Kalyvia Thorikou and 27 km southeast of Athens city centre. The Greek National Road 89 (Gerakas - Koropi - Lavrio - Sounio) passes southwest of the town. The municipal unit Kouvaras also includes the village Neos Kouvaras (pop. 566), 1 km to the southwest.

== Historical population ==
Year	Village population	Municipal unit population
1981	1,194	-
1991	928	1,369
2001	1,091	1,542
2011	1,426	2,008
2021	1,341	1,932

== Historical monuments ==
The church of St. George. A wall painting monument (1743) of Georgios Markou the Argus, the great and prolific post-Byzantine ecclesiastic iconographer of the 18th century (".... San Giorgio (agiografia su gli anni 1743), che si trova al paesino di Cuvara, dell 'Attica...." Evangelos Andreou http://ketlib.lib.unipi.gr/xmlui/handle/ket/849
