= Lagonisi =

Lagonissi Λαγονήσι
- Settlement
- Location within Greece
- Coordinates: 37°47.1′N 23°53.9′E
- Country: Greece
- Administrative region: Attica
- Regional unit: East Attica
- Municipality: Saronikos
- Municipal unit: Kalyvia Thorikou
- Elevation: 5 m (16 ft)

Population (2015)
  - Municipal unit: 7,000 (estimate)
- Time zone: UTC+2 (EET)
  - Summer (DST): UTC+3 (EEST)
- Postal code: 190 10
- Area code: 22910
- Vehicle registration: Z

Lagonissi (Greek: Λαγονήσι, meaning "island of the rabbit" from the characteristic rabbit-shaped form of the Lagonisi peninsula) (from greek word "λαγός" and Greek: "νήσος") is a seaside residential area in the Athens Riviera and the southern part of Kalyvia Thorikou in East Attica. It is situated close to the shore and on a peninsula by the Saronic Gulf. Lagonisi is located approximately 30 km southeast of Athens and 35 km northwest of Cape Sounio. Restaurant facilities, cafeterias and bars are located mainly at the heart of Lagonissi, close to Kalyvion Avenue (the road connecting Lagonissi with Kalyvia Thorikou). It is part of Athens metropolitan area.

== Beaches ==
Lagonisi has many sandy beaches including those of Pefko, Agios Nikolas and Galazia Akti.

== Education ==
The increasing number of new residents, most notably from the southern suburbs of Athens has led to the construction of public schools for children of all ages. Most specifically, the last decades there have been built two nursery schools, two primary schools, one middle school and one high school. There are also two private nursery schools, one of whom is English-speaking.

== Transportation ==
Greek National Road 91 connects Lagonissi with Athens and Sounio, while Thorikou road connects Lagonisi with Greek National Road 89. OASA (Athens Urban Transport Organisation) operates a frequent all-year round bus service to and from Elliniko metro station with the designation 122. The average travel time between Lagonisi and Elliniko metro station is about 50 minutes. Furthermore, there is a KTEL coach service connecting central Athens with the entire coastal area of western Attica, from Palaio Faliro to Cape Sounion. An inter-municipality bus service operating four to five times per day connects Lagonissi with Kalyvia Thorikou. Taxi service is available as well.

== Sports ==
Lagonisi has an indoor basketball/volleyball arena located close to the middle school. There are numerous outdoor basketball courts and football pitches, a tennis court and two beach volleyball courts. Furthermore, there is a gym and many indoor areas provide lessons for martial arts, yoga and aerobic exercises. An equestrian club called "St.George" is located in the eastern outskirts of the community as well.

== Residents ==
Shipping billionaire Aristotle Onassis had a villa in Lagonisi and was a part-time resident. His niece, artist Marilena Patronicolas, inherited that villa, and in the 1980s she stayed there with Prime Minister Andreas Papandreou, with whom she had an affair.

== Climate ==
Lagonisi has a hot semi-arid climate (Köppen climate classification: BSh) with mild winters, hot summers and low annual precipitation. Together with Anavyssos it is the driest area in mainland Greece.

Climate data for Lagonisi, Athens Riviera 60 m a.s.l.
| Month | Jan | Feb | Mar | Apr | May | Jun | Jul | Aug | Sep | Oct | Nov | Dec | Year |
|---|---|---|---|---|---|---|---|---|---|---|---|---|---|
| Record high °C (°F) | 22.5 (72.5) | 25.2 (77.4) | 26.3 (79.3) | 29.7 (85.5) | 36.3 (97.3) | 40.7 (105.3) | 41.9 (107.4) | 43.3 (109.9) | 36.7 (98.1) | 31.8 (89.2) | 27.3 (81.1) | 24.4 (75.9) | 43.3 (109.9) |
| Mean daily maximum °C (°F) | 15.2 (59.4) | 16.1 (61.0) | 17.7 (63.9) | 21.4 (70.5) | 25.5 (77.9) | 30.4 (86.7) | 33.7 (92.7) | 33.4 (92.1) | 29.4 (84.9) | 24.7 (76.5) | 20.7 (69.3) | 16.6 (61.9) | 23.7 (74.7) |
| Daily mean °C (°F) | 12.3 (54.1) | 13.0 (55.4) | 14.3 (57.7) | 17.6 (63.7) | 21.6 (70.9) | 26.3 (79.3) | 29.7 (85.5) | 29.7 (85.5) | 25.9 (78.6) | 21.5 (70.7) | 17.8 (64.0) | 13.8 (56.8) | 20.3 (68.5) |
| Mean daily minimum °C (°F) | 9.3 (48.7) | 9.9 (49.8) | 10.9 (51.6) | 13.8 (56.8) | 17.8 (64.0) | 22.3 (72.1) | 25.6 (78.1) | 25.9 (78.6) | 22.3 (72.1) | 18.3 (64.9) | 14.9 (58.8) | 11.0 (51.8) | 16.8 (62.3) |
| Record low °C (°F) | −1.7 (28.9) | 1.1 (34.0) | 1.3 (34.3) | 6.8 (44.2) | 12.8 (55.0) | 15.2 (59.4) | 19.6 (67.3) | 21.3 (70.3) | 15.6 (60.1) | 11.3 (52.3) | 7.7 (45.9) | 2.9 (37.2) | −1.7 (28.9) |
| Average rainfall mm (inches) | 47.7 (1.88) | 33.4 (1.31) | 33.0 (1.30) | 13.5 (0.53) | 7.5 (0.30) | 10.0 (0.39) | 5.1 (0.20) | 2.8 (0.11) | 17.8 (0.70) | 19.5 (0.77) | 47.8 (1.88) | 57.7 (2.27) | 295.8 (11.64) |
Source: Davis WeatherLink network (Apr 2012-Jan 2025)
