= Saronida =

Saronida Σαρωνίδα
- Municipal unit
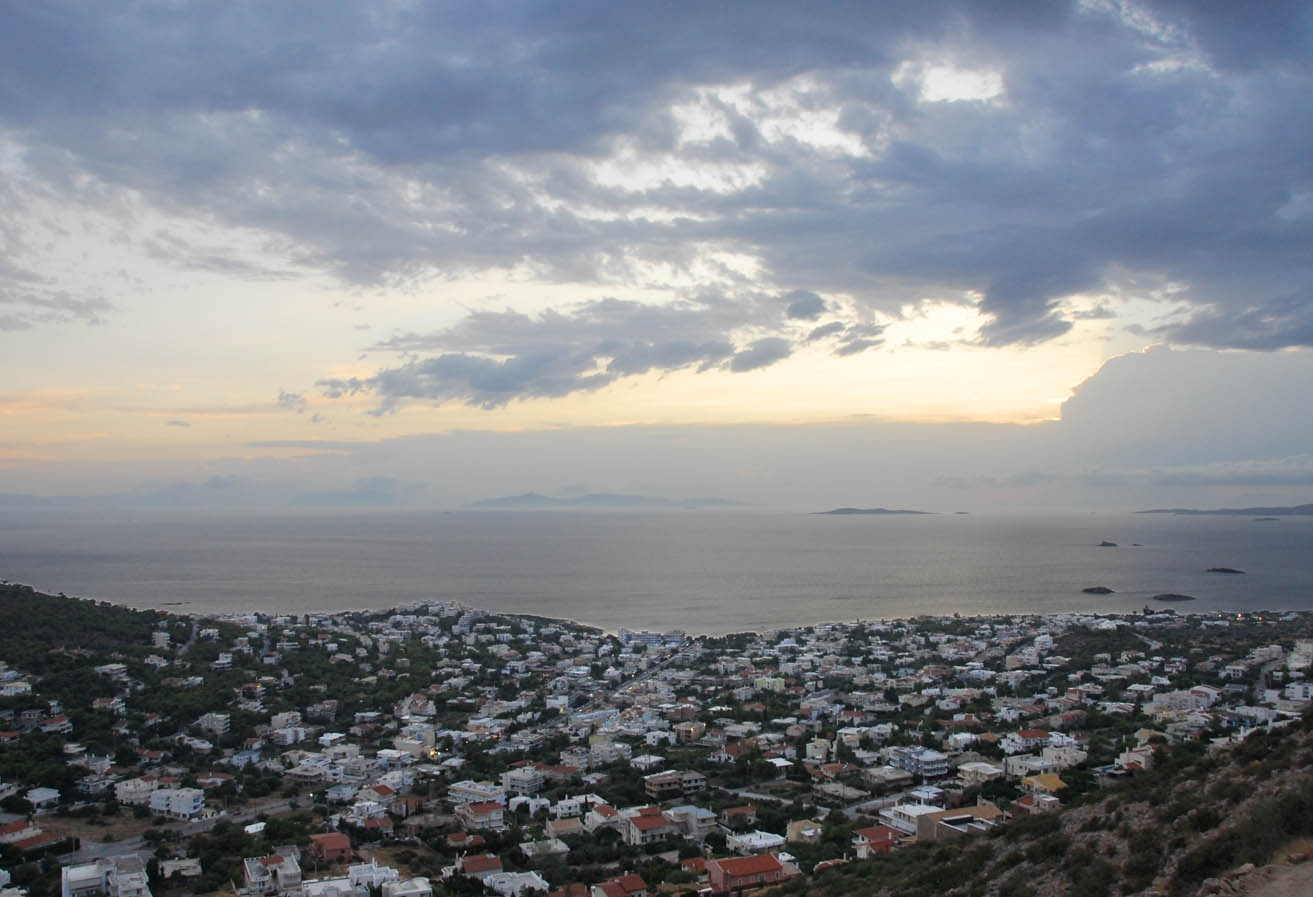

- Location within the regional unit

- Location within Greece
- Coordinates: 37°44′N 23°54′E
- Country: Greece
- Administrative region: Attica
- Regional unit: East Attica
- Municipality: Saronikos

Area
  - Municipal unit: 6.670 km^{2} (2.575 sq mi)
- Elevation: 10 m (33 ft)

Population (2021)
  - Municipal unit: 3,424
  - Municipal unit density: 513.3/km^{2} (1,330/sq mi)
- Time zone: UTC+2 (EET)
  - Summer (DST): UTC+3 (EEST)
- Postal code: 190 13
- Area code: 22910
- Vehicle registration: Z

Saronida (Greek: Σαρωνίδα) is a seaside resort village and former community in East Attica, Greece. Since the 2011 local government reform it is part of the municipality Saronikos, of which it is a municipal unit. The municipal unit has an area of 6.670 km^{2}.

== Geography ==
Saronida is located on the Saronic Gulf coast, in the southeastern part of the Attica peninsula. It lies on the western foot of the Olympos hill. It is 2 km northwest of Anavyssos, 10 km south of Kalyvia Thorikou and 31 km southeast of Athens city centre. Greek National Road 91 (Athens - Sounio) passes through the town.

Saronida is connected to Athens by bus services.

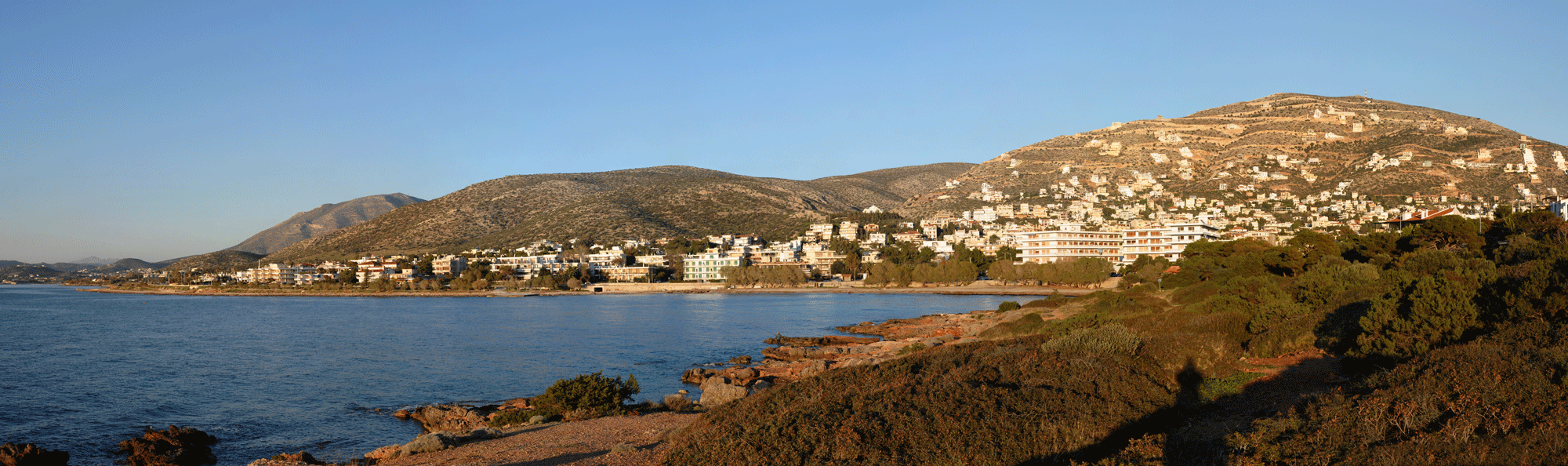

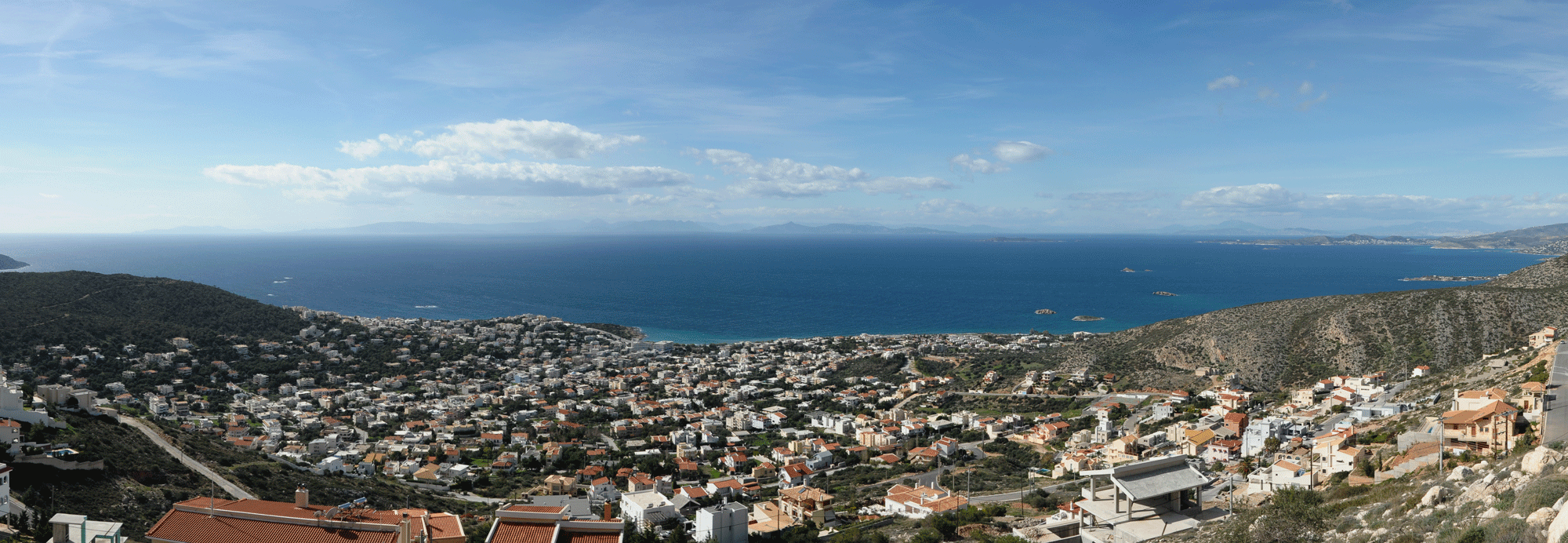
View of Saronida

== Historical population ==
Year	Population
1981	733
1991	1,572
2001	2,102
2011	2,932
2021	3,424
