= Laureotic Olympus =

Hill in Attica, Greece

Coordinates: 37.753°N 23.931°E

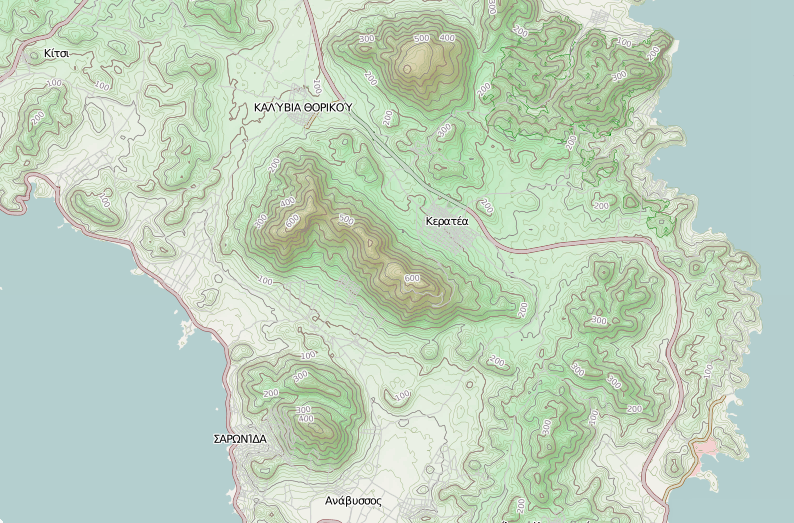
Topographic map of Mesogeia, Attica

Laureotic Olympus (named for the region of Laurium, also Όλυμπος Αττικής "Attic Olympus", Σκόρδι) is a hill in Attica, just north of Anavyssos, in Saronikos municipality, East Attica, Greece. At a height of 487 m is one of the three major elevations of southern Attica, alongside mounts Panio and Merenda (Myrrhinous).

Attic Olympus is the place of origin of the white marble used in the Temple of Poseidon at Sounion. It is also notable as the site of an early Christian basilica, known as the Basilica of Laureotic Olympos, established before AD 559, a three-aisled church with double narthex and baptistery, decorated with sculpted marble and a mosaic floor.
