= Attica =

Historical region of Greece, including the city of Athens

Attica Αττική
- Region
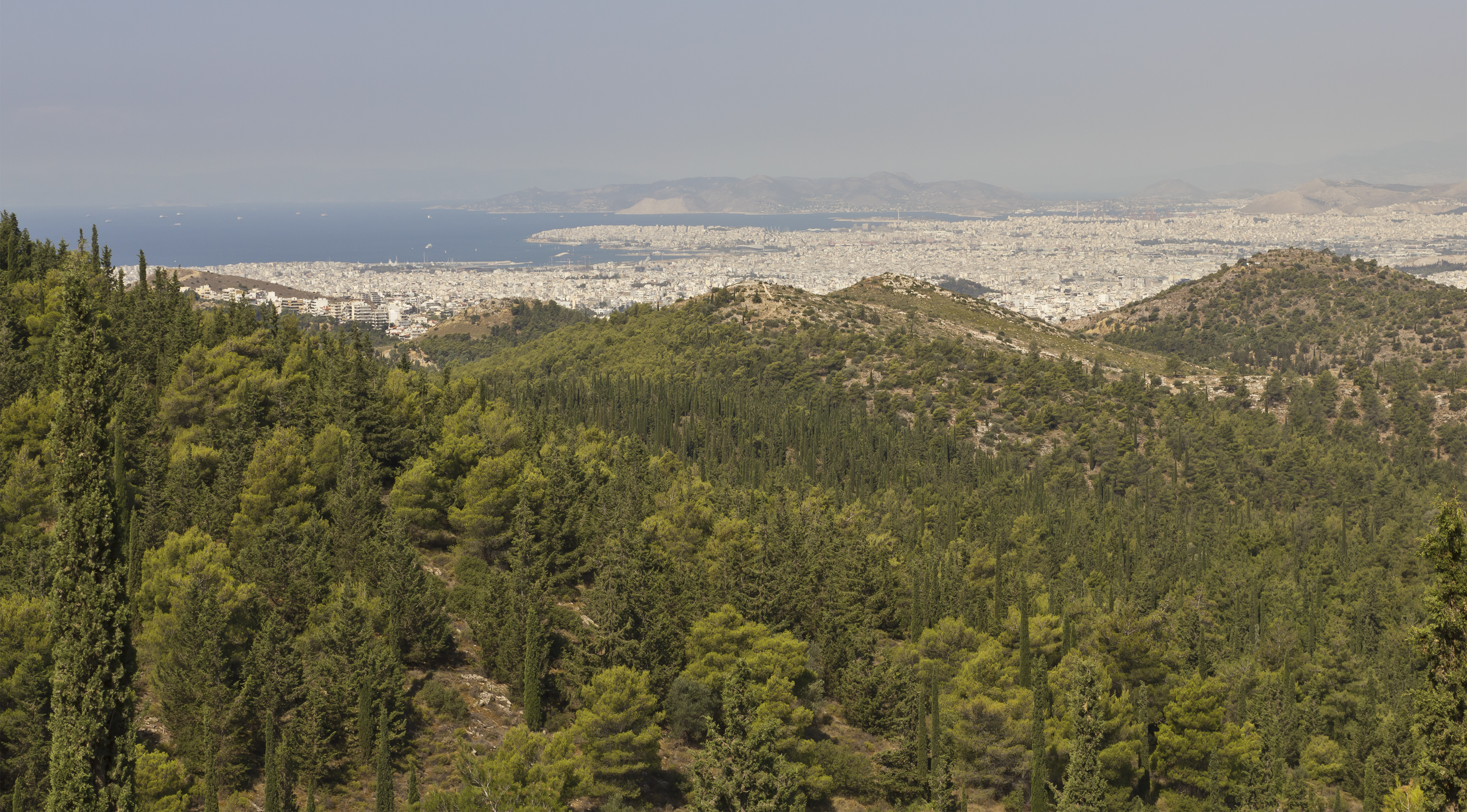
- View from Kaisariani Hill looking towards Athens agglomeration, with Salamis visible in the background

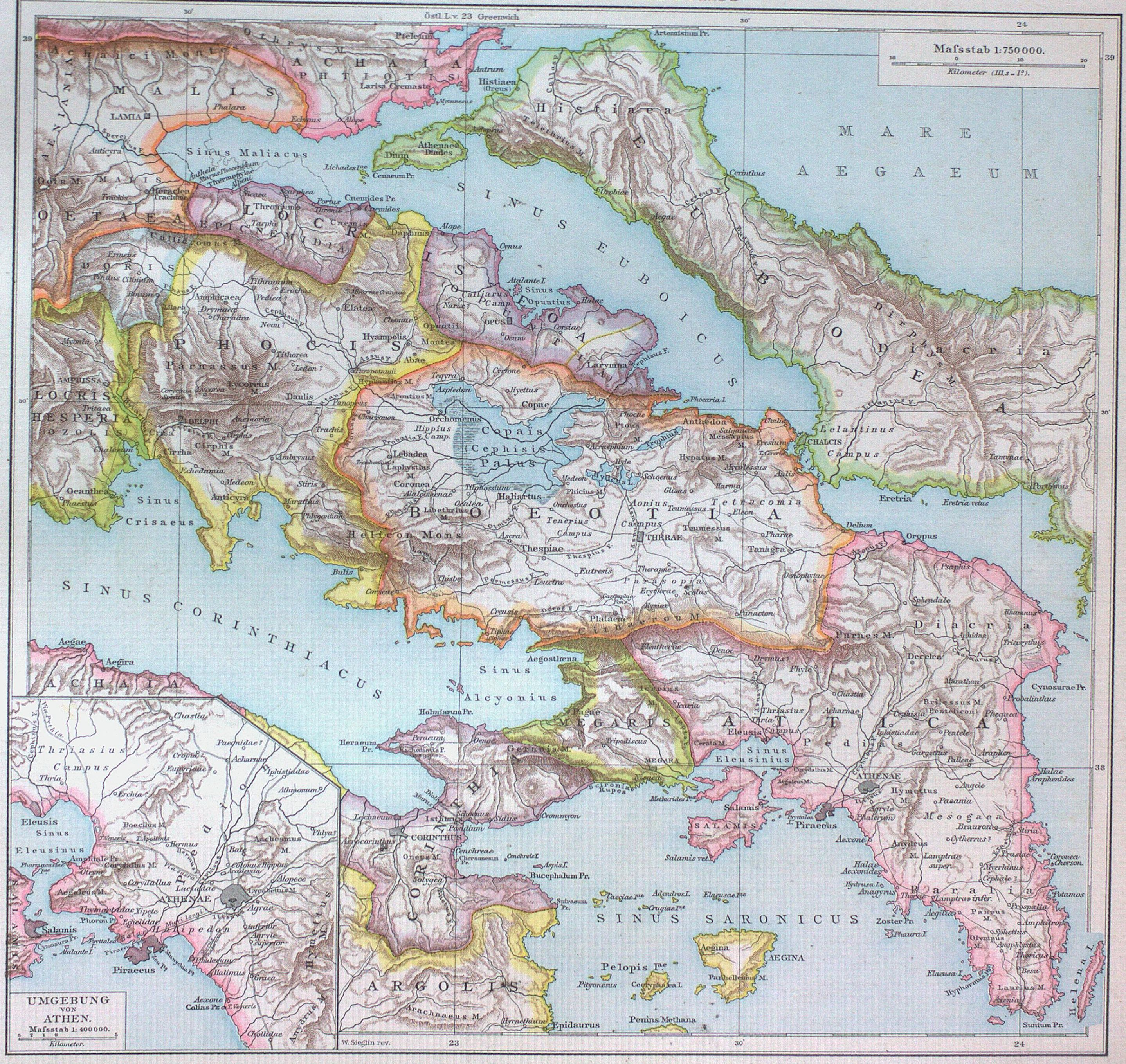
- Map of ancient Athens in ancient Attica
- Country: Greece
- Location: Central Greece
- Major cities: Athens
- Dialects: Attic
- Key periods: Athenian Empire (477–404 BC); Second Athenian League (378–338 BC)

Attica (/ˈætɪkə/ AT-ik-ə; Greek: Αττική [atiˈci]; Ancient Greek: Ἀττική [atːikɛ̌ː]), or the Attic Peninsula, is a historical region that encompasses the entire Athens metropolitan area, which consists of the city of Athens, the capital of Greece and the core city of the metropolitan area, as well as its surrounding suburban cities and towns. It is a peninsula projecting into the Aegean Sea, bordering on Boeotia to the north and Megaris to the west. The mines of Laurion were an important mining region located at Lavrio, on the southern tip of the peninsula.

The history of Attica is closely linked with that of Athens. In ancient times, Attica corresponded with the classical Athens city‑state. It was the most prominent region in Ancient Greece, specifically during the Golden Age of Athens in the classical period. Ancient Attica was divided into demoi, or municipalities, from the reform of Cleisthenes in 508/7 BC, grouped into three zones: urban (astu) in the region of Athens main town, and Piraeus (the port), coastal (paralia) along the coastline, and inland (mesogeia) in the interior.

The modern administrative region of Attica is more extensive than the historical region, and includes Megaris as part of the regional unit of West Attica, the Saronic Islands and Cythera, as well as the municipality of Troizinia on the Peloponnesian mainland.

== Eponymous name ==
According to the Roman geographer Pausanias, the place was originally named Actaea, but was later renamed in the honour of Atthis, daughter of king Cranaus of Athens.

== Geography ==
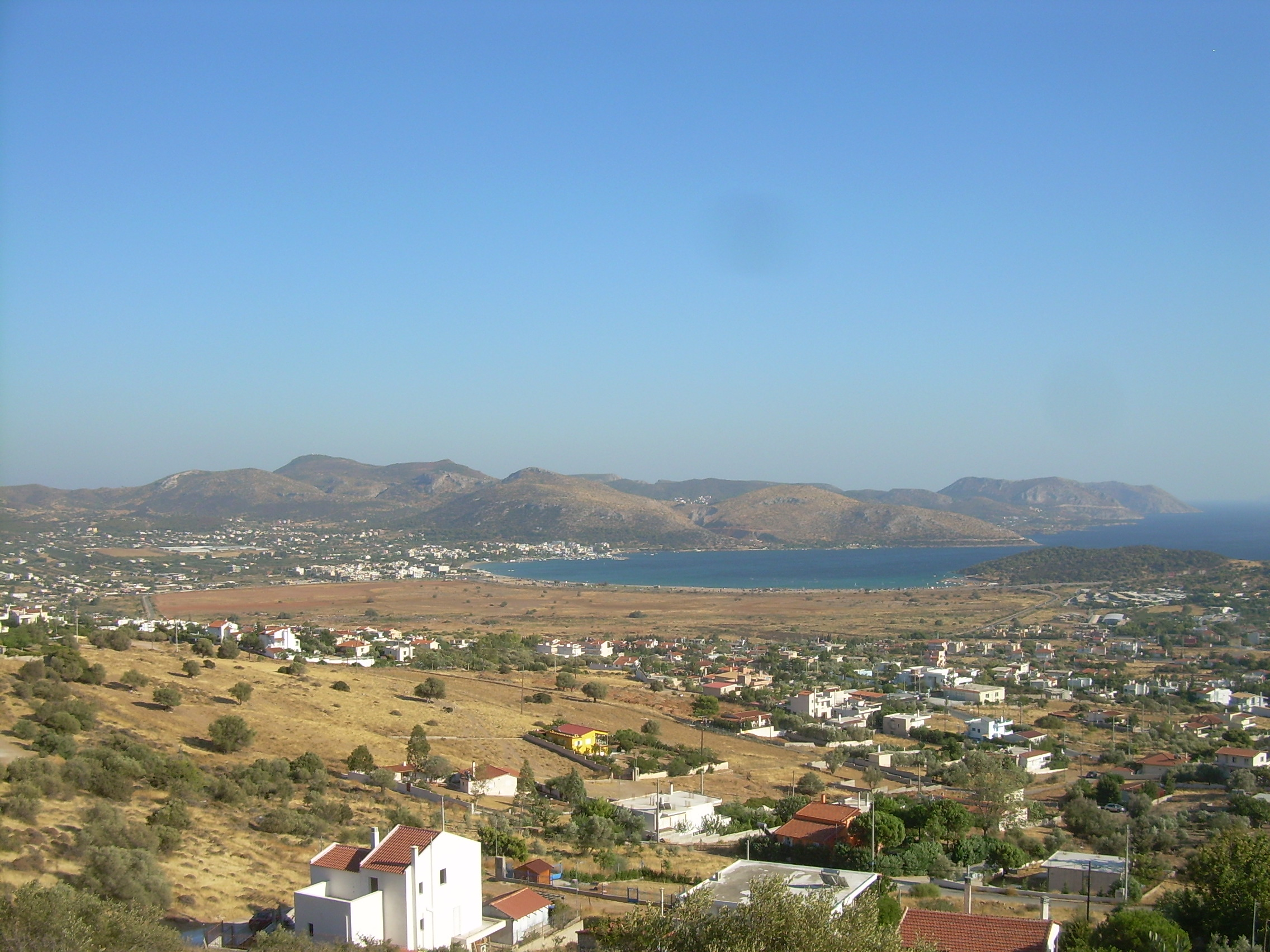
View from Anavyssos, looking south-east towards Palaia Fokaia.

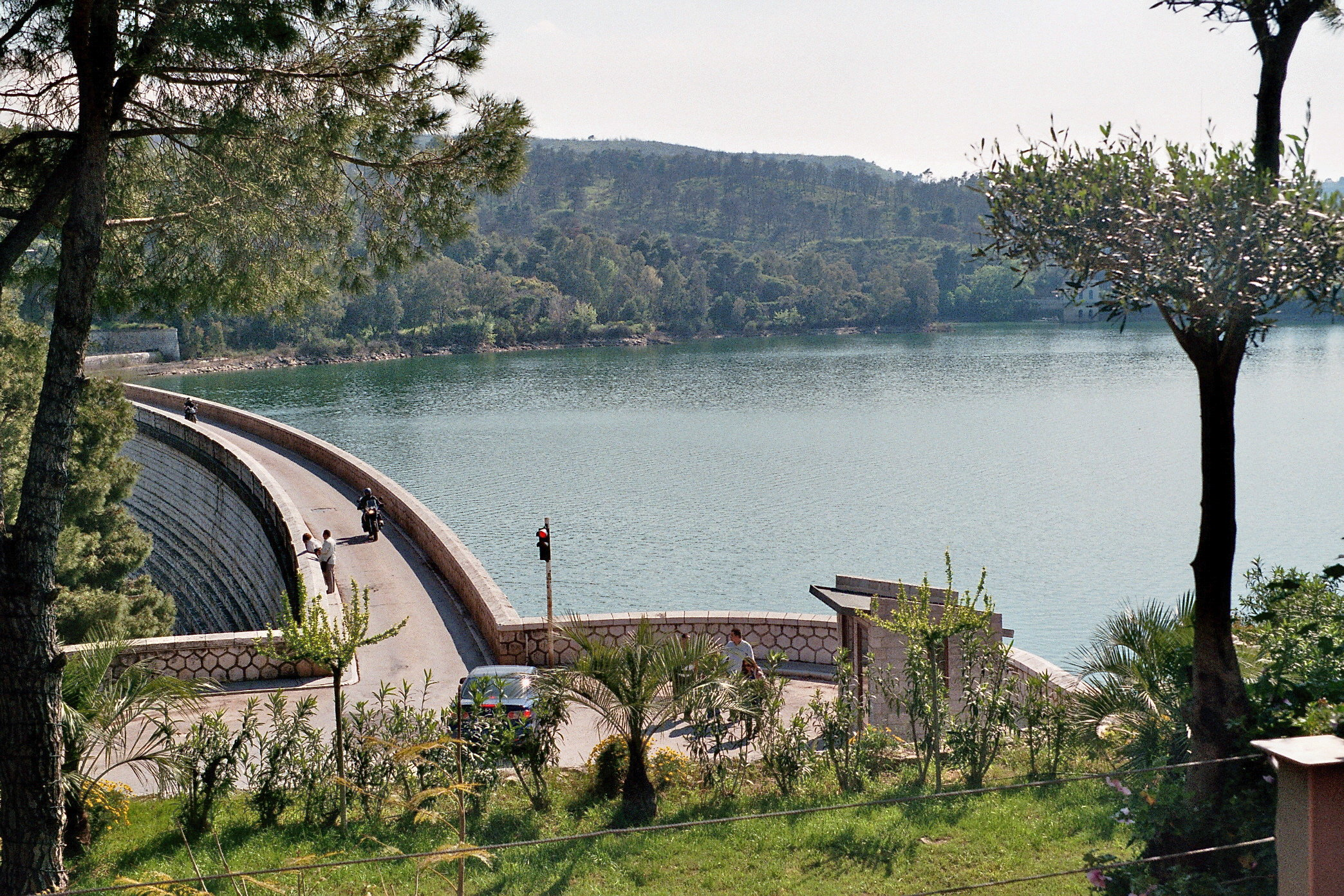
Lake Marathon

Attica is a triangular peninsula jutting into the Aegean Sea. It is naturally divided to the north from Boeotia by the 10 mi (16 km) long Cithaeron and Parnes mountain ranges.

To the west of Eleusis, the Greek mainland narrows into Megaris, connecting to the Peloponnese at the Isthmus of Corinth. The southwestern coast of Attica, also known as the Athens Riviera, forms the eastern coastline of the Saronic Gulf. Mountains separate the peninsula into the plains of Pedias, Mesogeia, and the Thriasian Plain. The mountains of Attica are the Hymettus, the eastern portion of the Geraneia, Parnitha (the highest mountain of Attica), Aigaleo and Penteli. Four mountains — Aigaleo, Parnitha, Penteli and Hymettus (clockwise from the southwest) — delineate the hilly plain on which the Athens urban area now spreads. The plain is pockmarked by a plethora of semi-continuous hills, the most notable ones being the Tourkovounia, Lykavittos, the Acropolis of Athens itself and Philopappou. Mesogeia lies to the east of Mount Hymettus and is bound to the north by the foothills of Mount Penteli, to the east by the Euboean Gulf and Mount Myrrhinous, and to the south by the mountains of Lavrio (modern Lavreotiki), Paneio (Πάνειον Όρος), and Laureotic Olympus (Λαυρεωτικός Όλυμπος). The Lavrio region terminates in Cape Sounion, forming the southeastern tip of the Attic peninsula.

Athens' water reservoir, Lake Marathon, is artificial and was created by damming in 1920. Pine and fir forests cover the area around Parnitha. Hymettus, Penteli, Myrrhinous and Lavrio are forested with pine trees, whereas the rest are covered by shrubbery. Parts of the sprawling forests of mount Penteli and Parnitha have been lost to forest fires, while the Synngrou Estate on the foothills of the former (intersecting the border between the suburban towns of Kifisia, Melissia and Marousi is home to the sole remaining natural forest in the Athenian plain.

The Kifisos is the longest river in Attica, which starts from the foothills of mount Parnitha near Varibobi, crosses the Athenian plain and empties into the delta of Faliro east of the port of Piraeus.

According to Plato, Attica's ancient boundaries were fixed by the Isthmus, and, toward the continent, they extended as far as the heights of Cithaeron and Parnes. The boundary line came down toward the sea, bounded by the district of Oropus on the right and by the river Asopus on the left.

== History ==
=== Ancient history ===
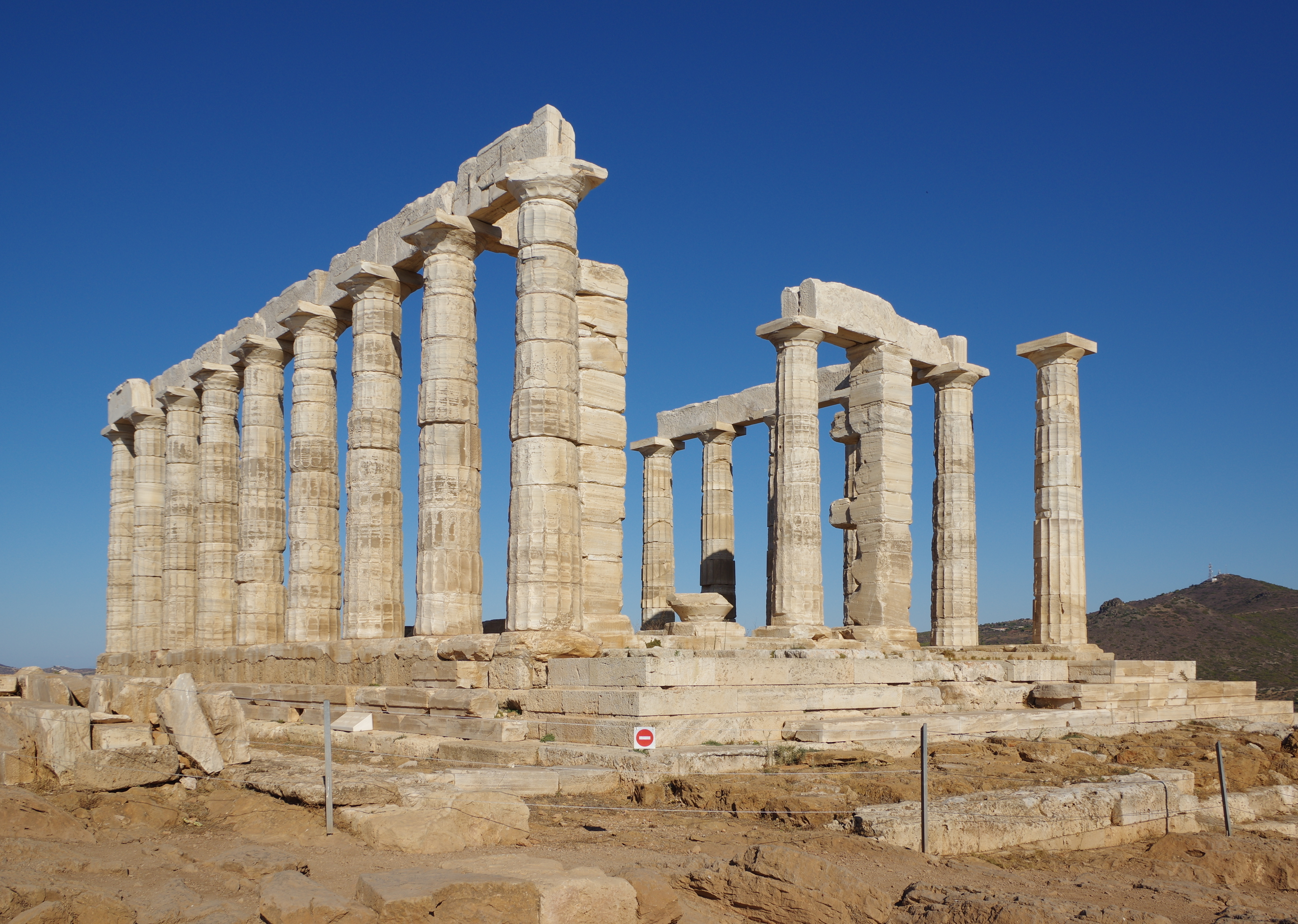
The Temple of Poseidon (c. 440 BC) at Cape Sounion, the southernmost point of Attica.

Delian League, under the leadership of Athens before the Peloponnesian War in 431 BC. Attica is shown in red.

During antiquity, the Athenians boasted about being Autochthones", the original inhabitants of the area (that is, an indigenous people, arising locally, not settlers or colonisers). The traditions current in the classical period recounted that, during the Greek Dark Ages, Attica had become the refuge of the Ionians, who belonged to a tribe from the northern Peloponnese. Supposedly, the Ionians had been forced out of their homeland by the Achaeans, who in turn had been forced out of their homeland by the Dorian invasion. Supposedly, the Ionians integrated with the ancient Atticans, who, afterward, considered themselves part of the Ionian tribe and spoke the Ionian dialect of Ancient Greek. Many Ionians later left Attica to colonise the Aegean coast of Asia Minor and to create the twelve cities of Ionia.

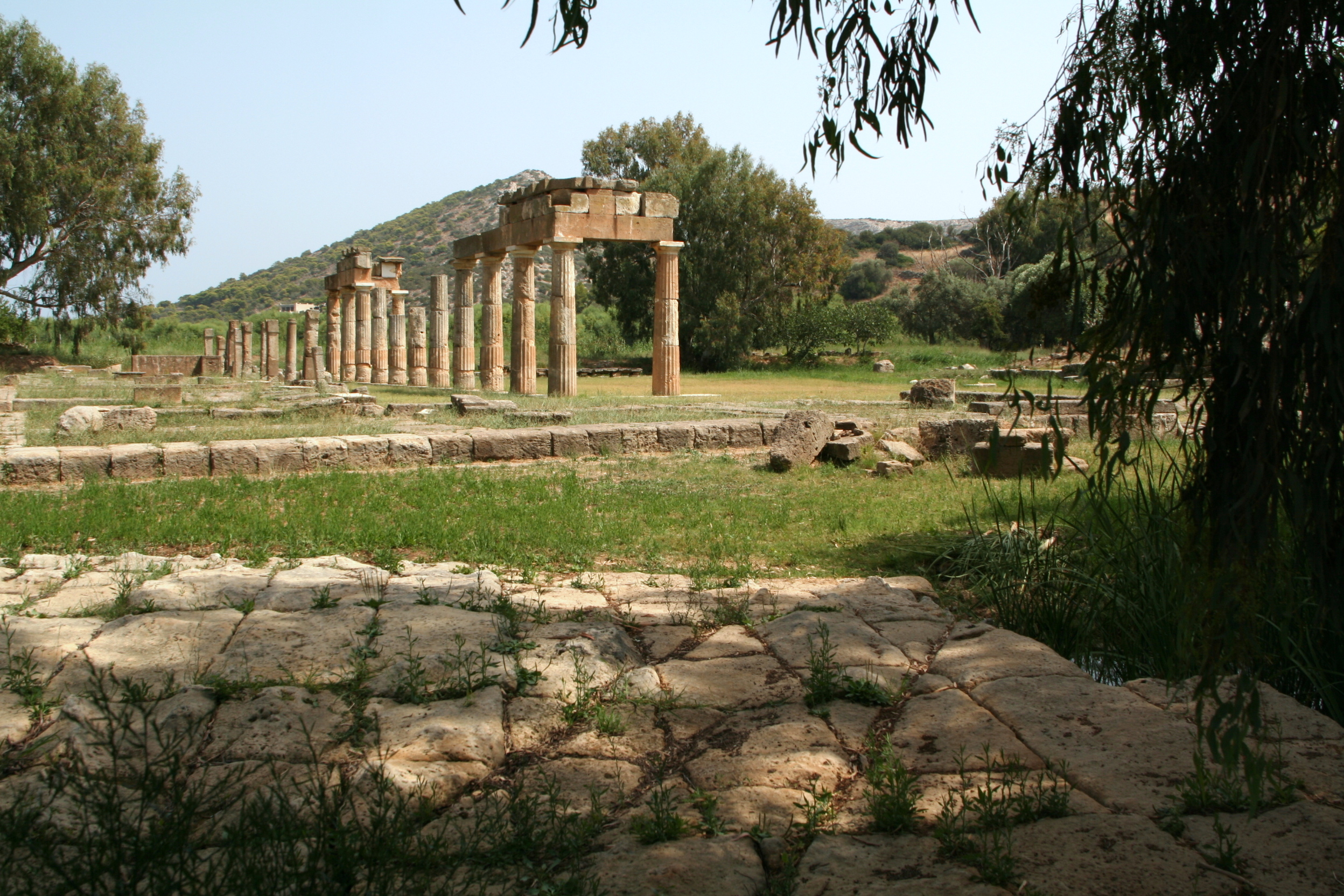
Ancient site of Vravrona

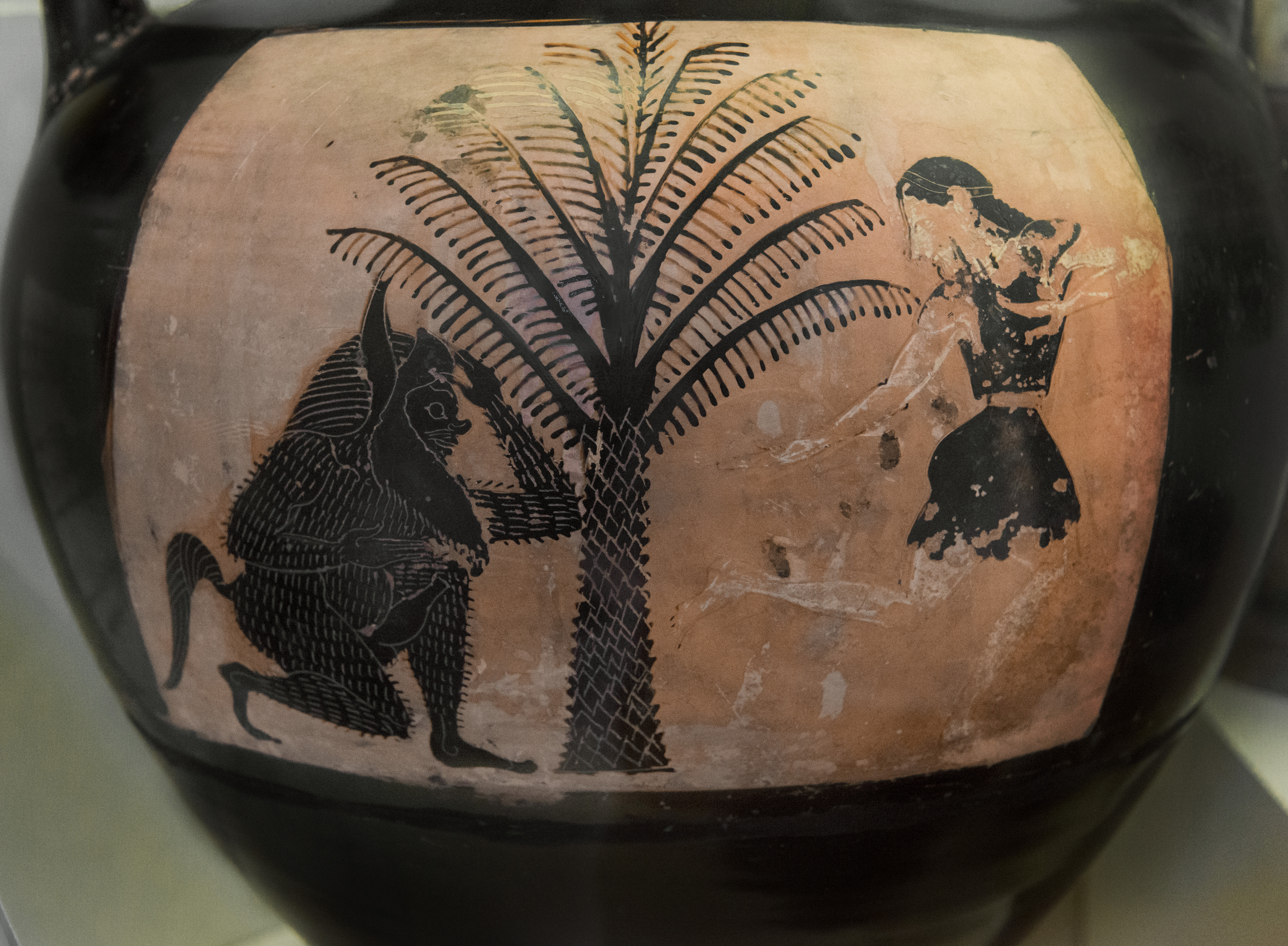
A Chalkidian Amphora, ca. 550 BC, showing a satyr startling a maenad. Museo Nazionale Etrusco, Rome.

During the Mycenaean period, the inhabitants of Attica lived in autonomous agricultural societies. The main places where prehistoric remains were found are Marathon, Rafina, Nea Makri, Brauron, Thorikos, Agios Kosmas, Elefsina, Menidi (Acharnes), Markopoulo, Spata, Aphidnae and Athens main city. All of these settlements flourished during the Mycenaean period.

According to tradition, Attica comprised twelve small communities during the reign of Cecrops, the legendary Ionian king of Athens. Strabo assigns these the names of Cecropia, Tetrapolis, Epacria, Decelea, Eleusis, Aphidna, Thoricus, Brauron, Cytherus, Sphettus, Cephisia, and possibly Phaleron. These were said to have been later incorporated in an Athenian state during the reign of Theseus, the mythical king of Athens. Many modern historians consider it more likely that the communities were progressively incorporated into an Athenian state during the 8th and the 7th centuries BC; some, however, push the date of incorporation well into the 6th century BC.

Until the 6th century BC, aristocratic families lived independent lives in the suburbs of Athens, such as Kolonos Hippios. Only after Peisistratos's tyranny and the reforms implemented by Cleisthenes did the local communities lose their independence and succumb to the central government in Athens. As a result of these reforms, Attica was divided into approximately a hundred municipalities, the demes (δῆμοι, dēmoi), and also into three large sectors: the city (ἄστυ), which comprised the areas of central Athens, Ymittos, Aegaleo and the foot of Mount Parnes (Parnitha), the coast (παράλια), that included the area between Eleusis and Cape Sounion and the area around the city (ἐσωτερικό-μεσογαία), inhabited by people living on the north of Mount Parnitha, Penteliko and the area east of the mountain of Hymettus on the plain of Mesogeia. Principally, each civic unit would include equal parts of townspeople, seamen, and farmers. A trittýs ('third') of each sector constituted a tribe. Consequently, Attica comprised ten tribes.

During the Peloponnesian war, Attica was invaded and raided several times by the Lacedaemonians, while in the war's third phase the fortress of Decelea was captured and fortified by Lacedaemon.

==== Fortresses ====
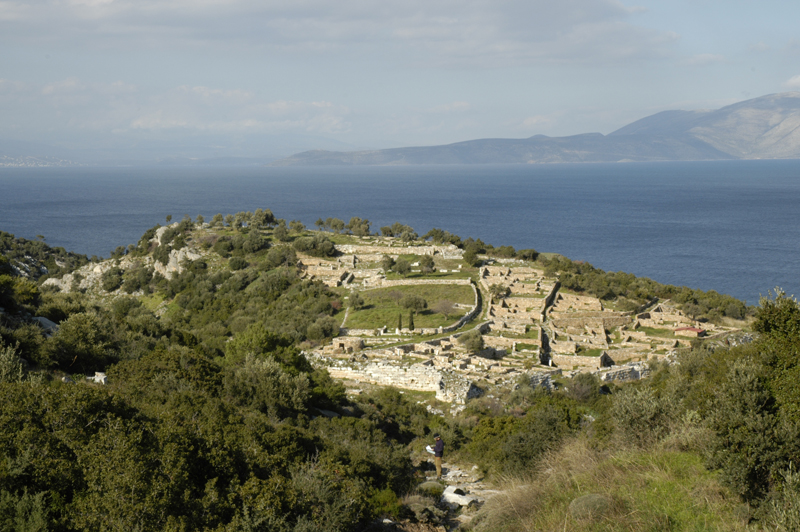
View of Rhamnous

During the classical period, Athens was fortified to the north by the fortress of Eleutherae, which is preserved well. Other fortresses are those of Oenoe, Decelea, Phyle and Aphidnae. To protect the mines at Laurium, on the coast, Athens was protected by the walls at Rhamnus, Thoricus, Sounion, Anavyssos, Piraeus, and Elefsina. Although these forts and walls had been constructed, Attica did not establish a fortification system until later, in the 4th century BC. Attica's warfare is displayed by piles of rubble from fortresses from the Chremonidean war.

==== Places of worship ====
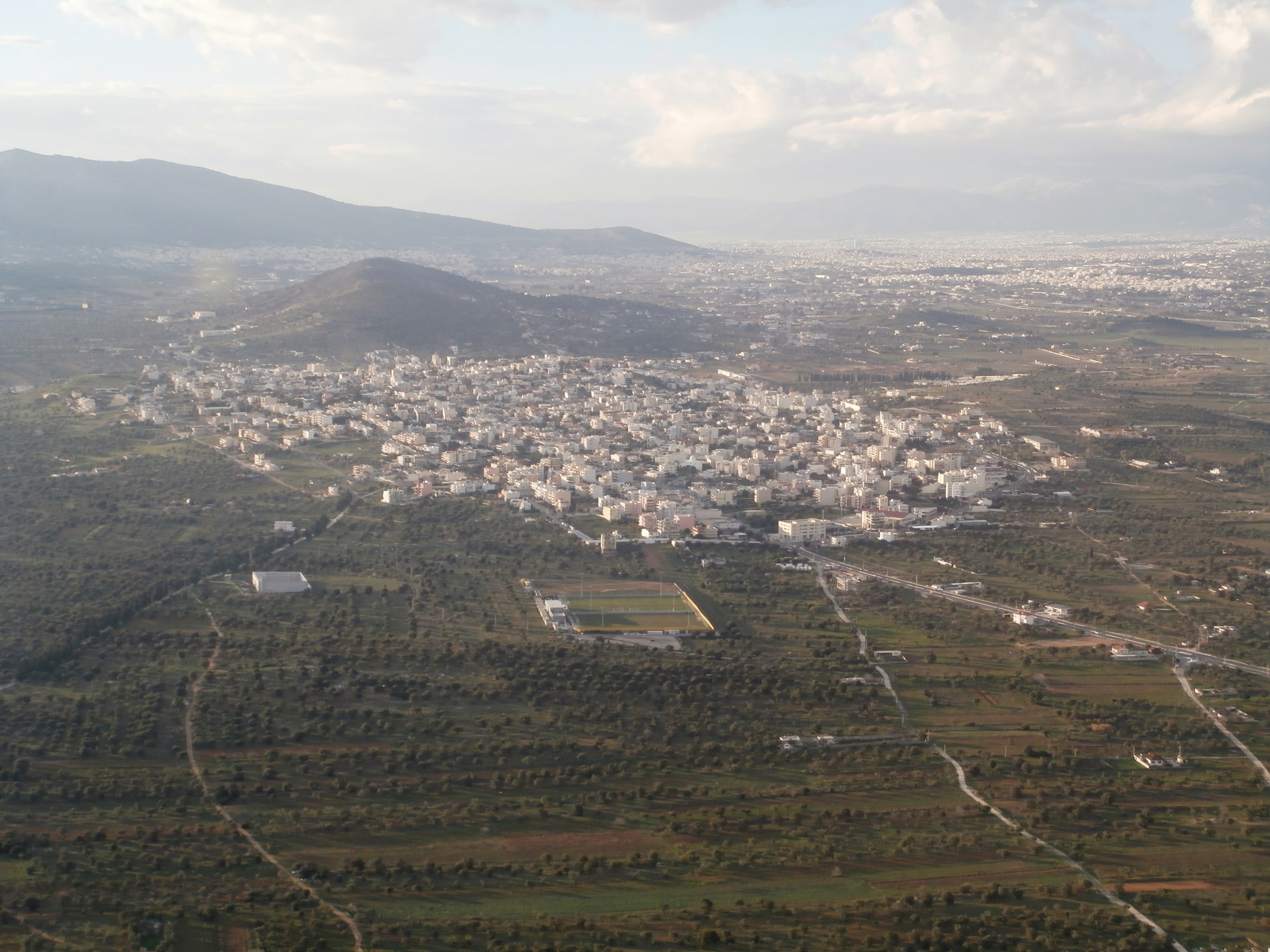
Spata airview

Even though archaeological ruins of religious importance are found in nearly the whole area of Attica, the most important are those found in Eleusis. The worship of the goddesses Demeter and Cora, beginning in the Mycenaean period, continued until the late years of antiquity.

Many other types of worship can be traced to the prehistory. For example, the worship of Pan and the Nymphs was common in many areas of Attica such as Marathon, Parnes and Ymittos. The god of wine, Dionysus, was worshipped mainly in the area of Icaria, now the suburb of Dionysus. Iphigeneia and Artemis were worshipped in Brauron, Artemis in Rafina, Athena on Sounion, Aphrodite on Iera Odos, and Apollo in Daphne.

The festival of Chalceia was celebrated every autumn in Attica. The festival honoured the gods Hephaestus and Athena Ergane. In the deme of Athmonon, in modern-day Marousi, the Athmoneia games were also celebrated.

=== Medieval period ===
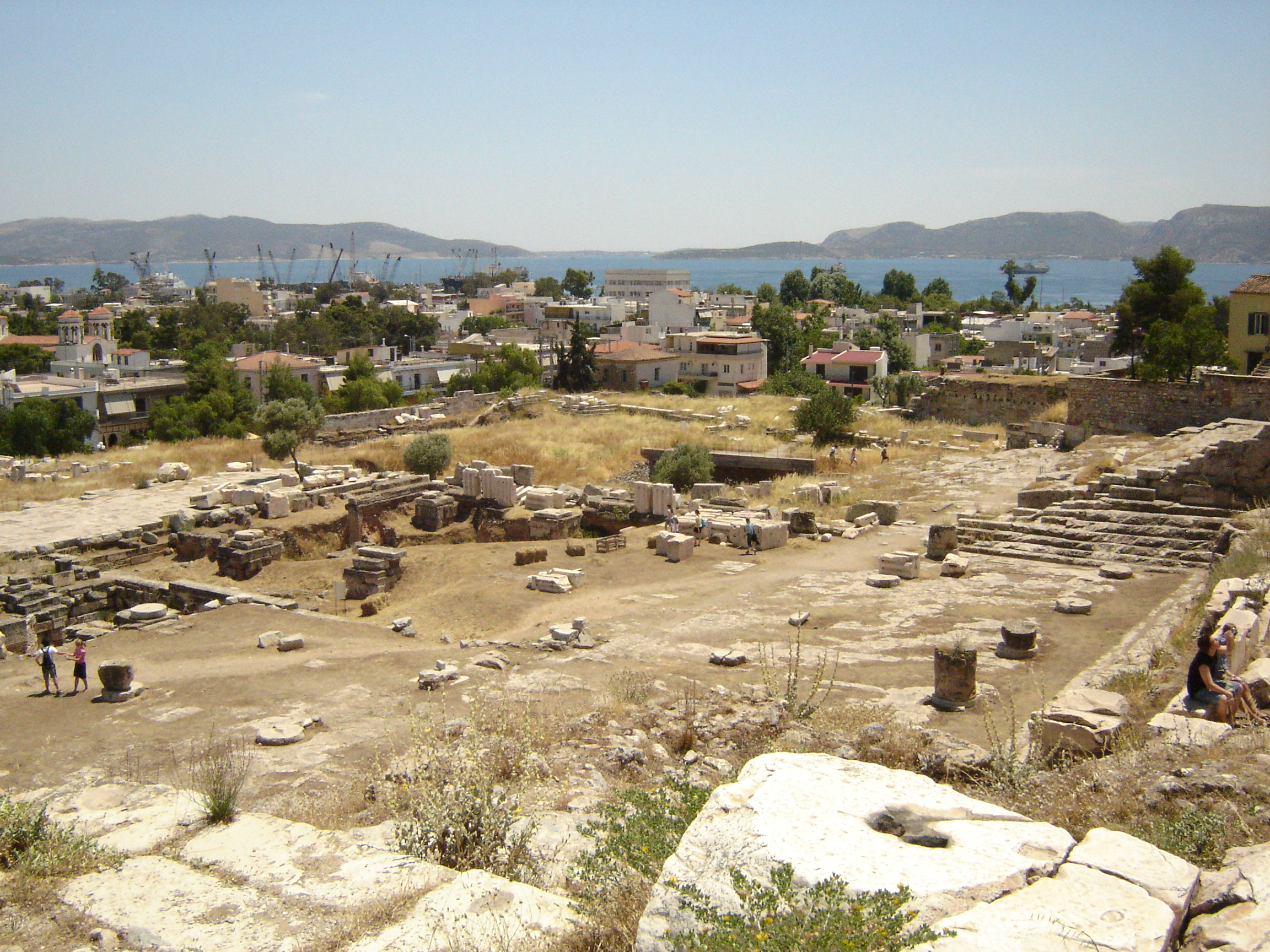
View over the excavation site towards Eleusis.

After the period of antiquity, Attica came under Roman, Byzantine, Venetian, and Ottoman rule. In the Roman period, the Scandinavian Heruli tribe raided Athens and Attica in 267 AD, destroying most of the city and laying waste to the countryside. During the Byzantine period Athens was an important mid-sized city. In 396 Attica was invaded by the Goths under the command of Alaric. Attica's population diminished in comparison to the neighbouring area of Boeotia.

The sites of historical interest date to the 11th and 12th centuries, when Attica was under the rule of the Franks. The great monastery of Dafni, that was built under Justinian I's rule, is an isolated case that does not signify a widespread development of Attica during the Byzantine period. On the other hand, the buildings built during the 11th and 12th centuries show a greater development that continued during the rule of the Franks, who did not impose strict rule.

From the 14th century onwards, the Arvanites came to Attica from what is today southern Albania. They were mostly invited as mercenaries by the local Greek lords.

During the Ottoman rule, Athens enjoyed some rights. However, that was not the case for the villages of Attica. Great areas were possessed by the Turks, who terrorised the population with the help of sipahis. The monasteries of Attica played a crucial role in preserving the Greek element of the villages.

In spite of its conquerors, Attica managed to maintain its traditions. This fact is proved by the preservation of ancient toponyms such as Oropos, Dionysus, Eleusis, and Marathon. During the Greek War of Independence in the 1820s, the peasants of Attica were the first to revolt (April 1821), occupying Athens and seizing the Acropolis that was handed over to the Greek revolutionaries in June 1822.

=== Attica after 1829 ===
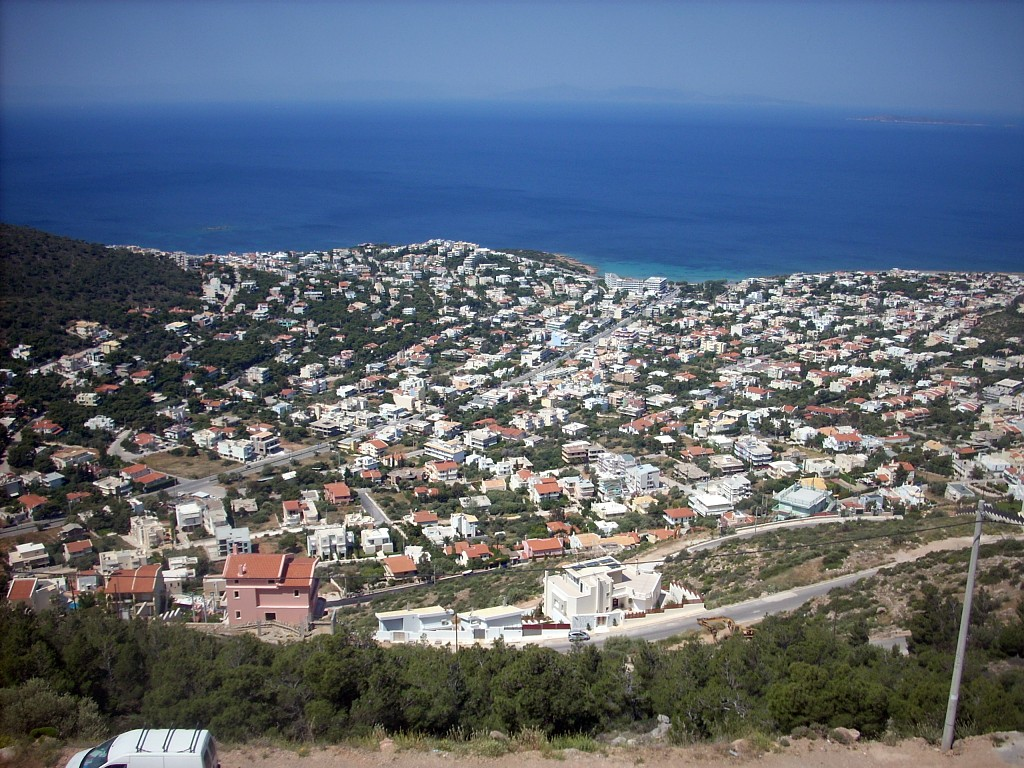
Saronida

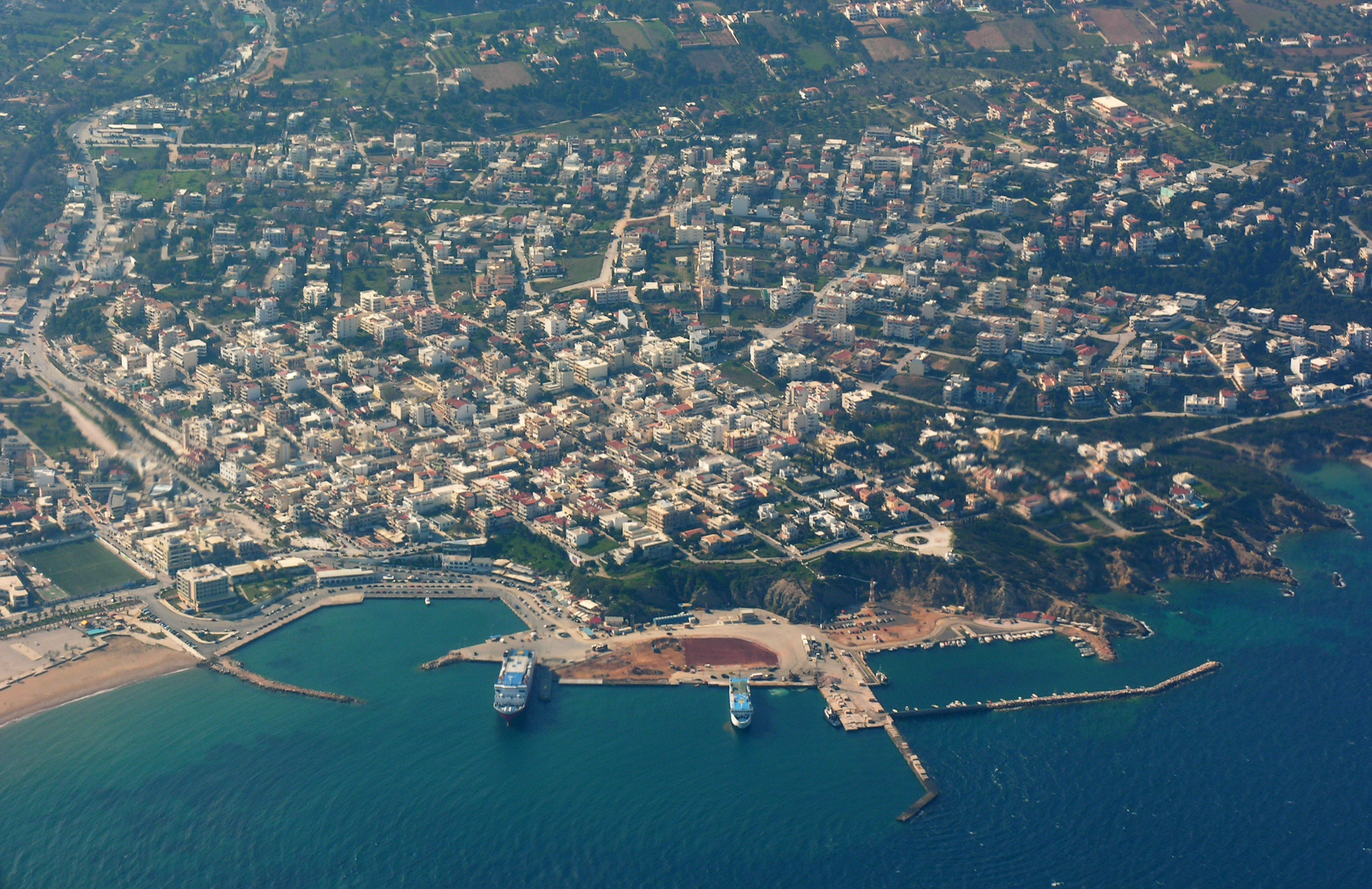
Aerial view of Rafina.

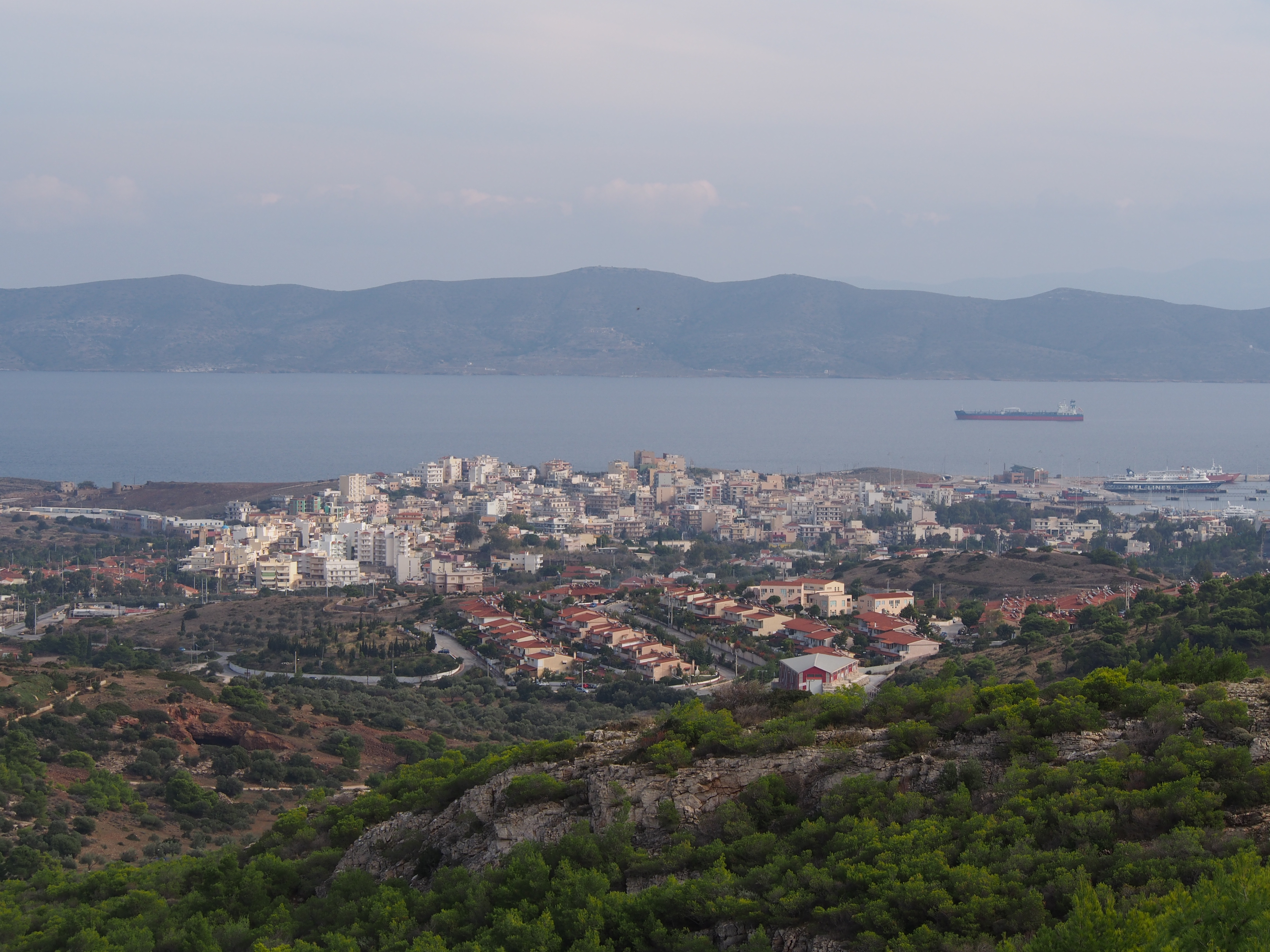
The port of Lavrio

Attica belonged to the newly-founded Greek state from its founding. From 1834, Athens was made the new Greek capital (moved from Nafplio in Argolis), which caused the gradual repopulation of Attica by other people around Greece. The most dramatic surge came with Greek refugees from Anatolia following the Greek genocide and later the population exchanges between Greece and Turkey under the Treaty of Lausanne. Today, much of Attica is occupied by urban Athens, encompassing the entirety of the Athenian plain. The modern Greek region of Attica includes classical Attica as well as the Saronic Islands, a small part of the Peloponnese around Troezen, and the Ionian Island of Kythira.

== See also ==
- Ascolia
- Attic Greek
- Attic orators
- Attic talent
- Atticism
- Neo-Attic
