= Eğribük =

Bay of the Mediterranean Sea in southern Turkey

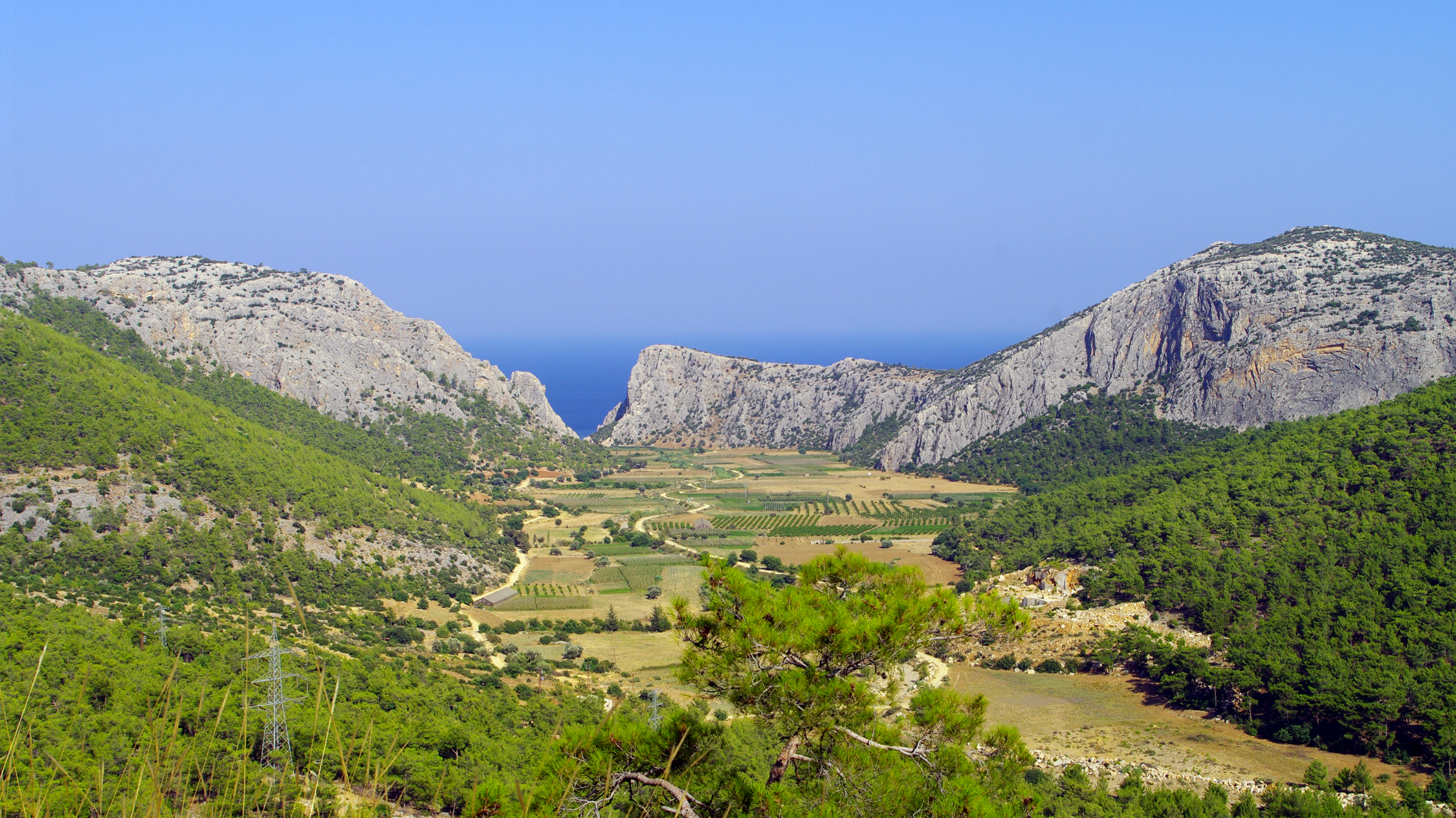
Seen from the northwest

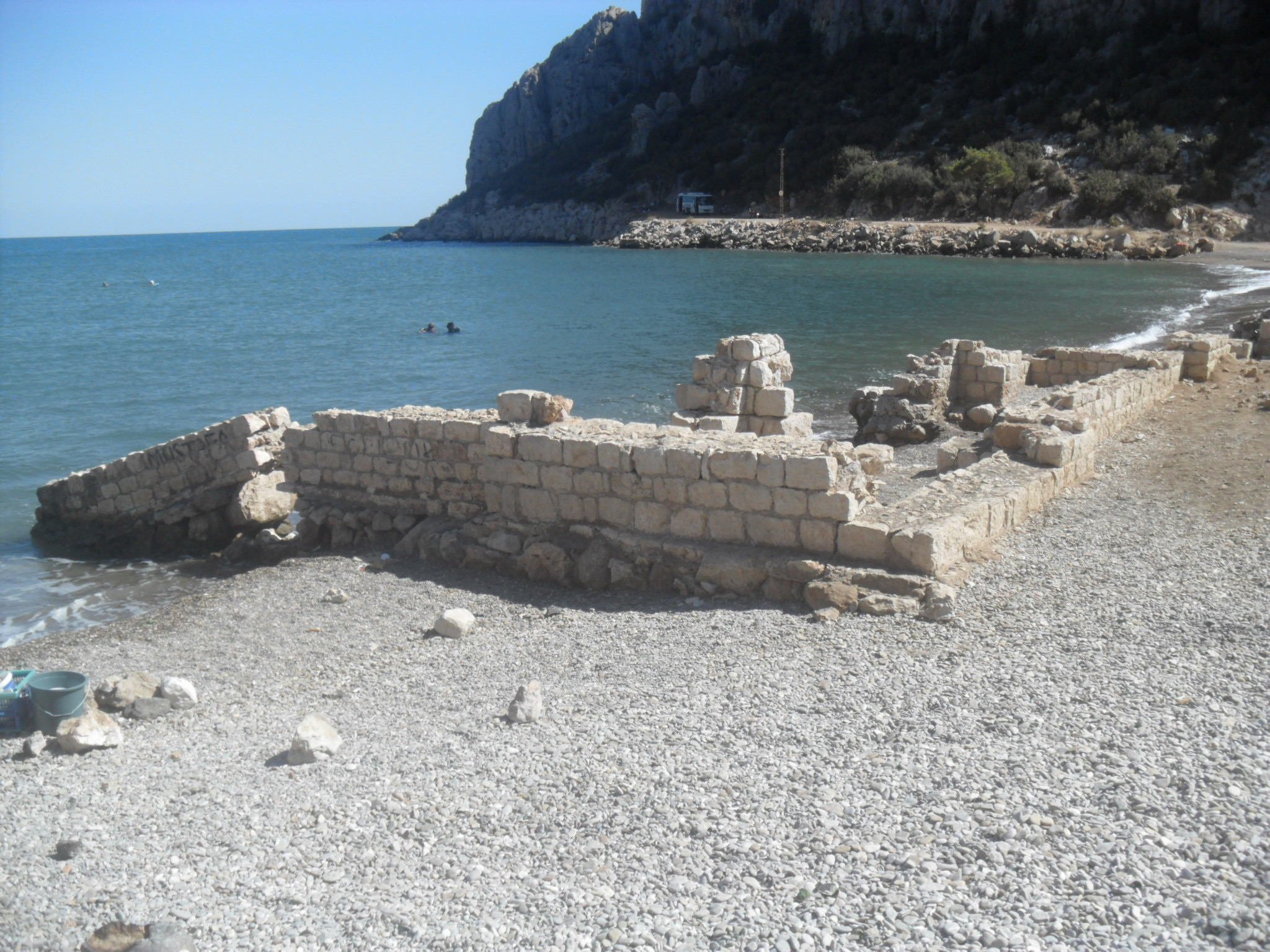
The beach

Eğribük (also known as Barbaros bay or Tahta Liman) is a small Mediterranean bay with ruins in the beach, in south Turkey.

Eğribük is in the Silifke ilçe (district) of Mersin Province at 36°16′10″N 33°48′29″E It is at the end point in the canyon of the Akdere creek. The sea is to the east of the bay. It is connected to Turkish state highway D.400 which is between Mersin and west Turkey by a lane of about 2 kilometres (1.2 mi). Its distance to Silifke is 30 kilometres (19 mi) and to Mersin is 115 kilometres (71 mi).

The bay which is not on the highway is a rather secluded recreation spot with a natural beach. In the middle of the beach there are some ruins. The ruins belong to Palaiai (old city). Although there are very few ruins, the underwater survey reveals that most of Palaiai ruins are submerged in the water. There is also a necropolis area in the shrubbery to the west of the beach. Judging from the grave types it is believed that Palaiai was a Roman town.
