= Neopalaia =

Conservation status
- Least Concern (IUCN 3.1)

Scientific classification
- Kingdom: Animalia
- Phylum: Chordata
- Class: Reptilia
- Order: Squamata
- Family: Scincidae
- Genus: Neopalaia; Deshmukh, 2024
- Species: N. pulchra

Binomial name
- Neopalaia pulchra (Boulenger, 1903)

Synonyms
- Palaia Slavenko, Tamar, Tallowin, Kraus, Allison, Carranza, & Meiri, 2021

Species of lizard

Neopalaia is a genus of skink found in Papua New Guinea. Slavenko et al. (2021) originally gave it the genus name Palaia, although this is preoccupied by a flatworm genus. As such, Deshmukh (2024) proposed the new generic name Neopalaia. The genus contains a single species, Neopalaia pulchra, named by George Albert Boulenger as a species of Lygosoma in 1903. Other authors have historically also included it in the genera Leiolopisma and Lipinia.
