= Ascolia =

Feast of Attica celebrated in honor of Dionysus

Ascolia, in Ancient Greece, was a yearly feast that the peasants of Attica celebrated in honor of Dionysus. The rites included sacrificing a goat, chosen because goats were prone to eating and destroying grapevines, and using its skin to make a football, which was filled with wine and smeared in oil. Festival participants then competed against each other by trying to leap onto it in a game that gave the festival its name (askoliazein, ἀσκωλιάζειν); the one who remained standing at the end of the contest won the wineskin as a prize. Participants also painted their faces with wine dregs, sang hymns, and recited satirical poetry.

The Atticans also made icons of Dionysus to hang in their vineyards to turn in the wind, which were called aiorai (αἰώραι). George Spence suggested that this was due to a popular belief that the god ensured fertility of any field he faced, while Varro speculated that the icons were intended as an offering to the spirits of the dead who had committed suicide by hanging.

The festival was eventually introduced into Italy as Vinalia, and the aiorai became known as oscilla.

The chief magistrate, or demarch, of a deme conducted the festival, while the deme paid for the expenses.
