= Anavyssos =

Town in Attica, Greece

Anavyssos Ανάβυσσος
- Municipal unit
- Location within the regional unit

- Location within Greece
- Coordinates: 37°44′N 23°57′E
- Country: Greece
- Administrative region: Attica
- Regional unit: East Attica
- Municipality: Saronikos

Area
  - Municipal unit: 14.478 km^{2} (5.590 sq mi)
- Elevation: 15 m (49 ft)

Population (2021)
  - Municipal unit: 6,180
  - Municipal unit density: 427/km^{2} (1,110/sq mi)
- Time zone: UTC+2 (EET)
  - Summer (DST): UTC+3 (EEST)
- Postal code: 190 13
- Area code: 22910
- Vehicle registration: Z

Anavyssos (Greek: Ανάβυσσος) is a town and a former municipality in East Attica, Greece, located in the Athens Riviera. Since the 2011 local government reform it is part of the municipality Saronikos, of which it is a municipal unit. The municipal unit has an area of 14.478 km^{2}. At the 2021 census it had 6,180 inhabitants.

It is situated near the Saronic Gulf coast, at the foot of Olympos hill (487 m). It is 2 km north of Palaia Fokaia, 4 km east of Saronida, 10 km west of Lavrio and 34 km southeast of Athens city centre. The Greek National Road 91 (Athens - Sounion) passes south of the town, along the coast. Anavyssos is located in the area of ancient Attica's demos of Anaphlystos, which has shown significant archaeological findings like Kroisos Kouros that is exhibited in the National Archaeological Museum of Athens. The contemporary settlement was originally a village founded by Greek refugees who resettled there after fleeing from various areas of Asia Minor after the Asia Minor Campaign.

Anavyssos is the place where Elias Venezis, one of the most important Greek novelists of the 20th century located his 1939 novel 'Tranquility' (Γαλήνη). Today Anavyssos is a major coastal resort of Attica famous for water-sports, the town sees its population tripled during the summer months. In addition to the main part of the town, Anavyssos includes a number of satellite settlements such as Ag. Nikolaos, Mavro Lithari, Paralia Anavyssou, Lakka, Alykes etc.

== Historical population ==
Year	Population
1981	2,383
1991	4,108
2001	7,189
2011	6,202
2021	6,180

== Climate ==
According to the station of the National Observatory of Athens and the Hellenic Centre for Marine Research, Anavyssos has hot semi-arid climate (Köppen climate classification: BSh) with mild winters, hot summers and very low annual precipitation. Together with Lagonisi it is the driest area in mainland Greece, the Athens Riviera and the Attica peninsula, receiving around 290 mm of annual precipitation.

Climate data for Anavyssos 10 m a.s.l.
Month	Jan	Feb	Mar	Apr	May	Jun	Jul	Aug	Sep	Oct	Nov	Dec	Year
Record high °C (°F)	21.3 (70.3)	22.9 (73.2)	24.3 (75.7)	32.0 (89.6)	32.9 (91.2)	38.4 (101.1)	40.2 (104.4)	41.9 (107.4)	36.2 (97.2)	33.4 (92.1)	26.9 (80.4)	22.7 (72.9)	41.9 (107.4)
Mean daily maximum °C (°F)	14.6 (58.3)	15.4 (59.7)	17.4 (63.3)	21.1 (70.0)	25.1 (77.2)	30.3 (86.5)	33.7 (92.7)	33.4 (92.1)	29.1 (84.4)	24.4 (75.9)	20.0 (68.0)	15.9 (60.6)	23.4 (74.1)
Daily mean °C (°F)	11.4 (52.5)	12.1 (53.8)	13.7 (56.7)	16.7 (62.1)	20.7 (69.3)	25.6 (78.1)	28.8 (83.8)	28.8 (83.8)	24.8 (76.6)	20.7 (69.3)	16.9 (62.4)	12.6 (54.7)	19.4 (66.9)
Mean daily minimum °C (°F)	8.1 (46.6)	8.7 (47.7)	10.0 (50.0)	12.3 (54.1)	16.4 (61.5)	20.9 (69.6)	23.8 (74.8)	24.3 (75.7)	20.5 (68.9)	17.0 (62.6)	13.7 (56.7)	9.6 (49.3)	15.4 (59.8)
Record low °C (°F)	−2.5 (27.5)	1.0 (33.8)	1.6 (34.9)	4.8 (40.6)	10.8 (51.4)	13.4 (56.1)	18.2 (64.8)	19.8 (67.6)	14.6 (58.3)	9.3 (48.7)	5.7 (42.3)	1.5 (34.7)	−2.5 (27.5)
Average rainfall mm (inches)	52.3 (2.06)	31.7 (1.25)	33.8 (1.33)	12.0 (0.47)	5.1 (0.20)	7.4 (0.29)	2.9 (0.11)	1.1 (0.04)	13.0 (0.51)	21.8 (0.86)	46.3 (1.82)	64.1 (2.52)	291.5 (11.46)
Source: National Observatory of Athens (Jun 2012- Sep 2025) Hellenic Centre for Marine Research World Meteorological Organization

== See also ==
- List of settlements in Attica
- Athens Riviera
