= Kalyvia Thorikou =

Kalyvia Thorikou Καλύβια Θορικού
- Municipal unit
- Location within the regional unit

- Location within Greece
- Coordinates: 37°50′N 23°55′E
- Country: Greece
- Administrative region: Attica
- Regional unit: East Attica
- Municipality: Saronikos

Area
  - Municipal unit: 70.636 km^{2} (27.273 sq mi)
- Elevation: 110 m (360 ft)

Population (2021)
  - Municipal unit: 15,486
  - Municipal unit density: 219.24/km^{2} (567.82/sq mi)
- Time zone: UTC+2 (EET)
  - Summer (DST): UTC+3 (EEST)
- Postal code: 190 10
- Area code: 22990
- Vehicle registration: Z
- Website: www.kalivia.gr

Kalyvia Thorikou (Greek: Καλύβια Θορικού) is a town and a former municipality in East Attica, Greece. Since the 2011 local government reform it is part of the municipality Saronikos, of which it is the seat and a municipal unit. The municipal unit has an area of 70.636 km^{2}. The town has historically been an Arvanite settlement.

== Geography ==
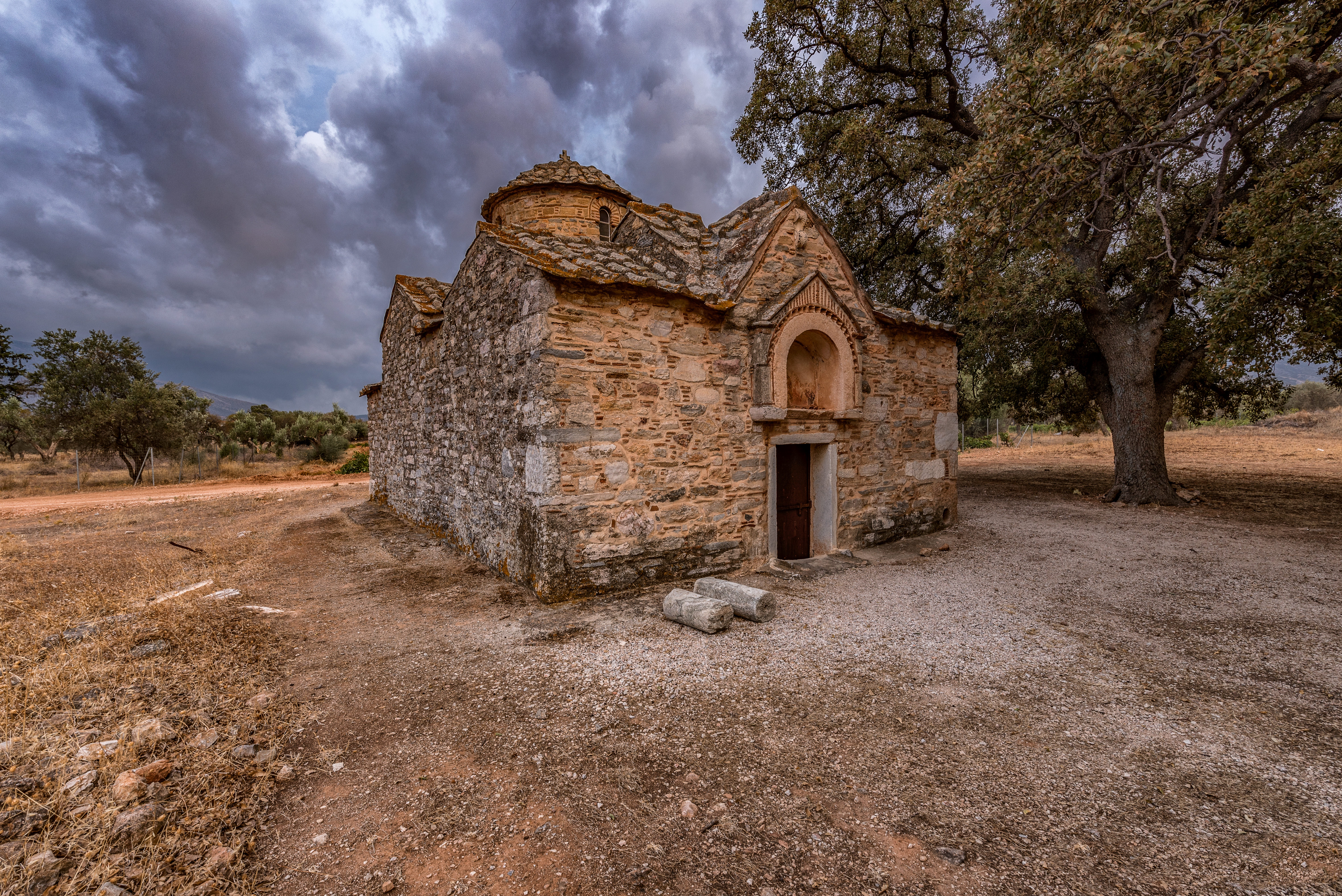
Agios Petros (Byzantine church)

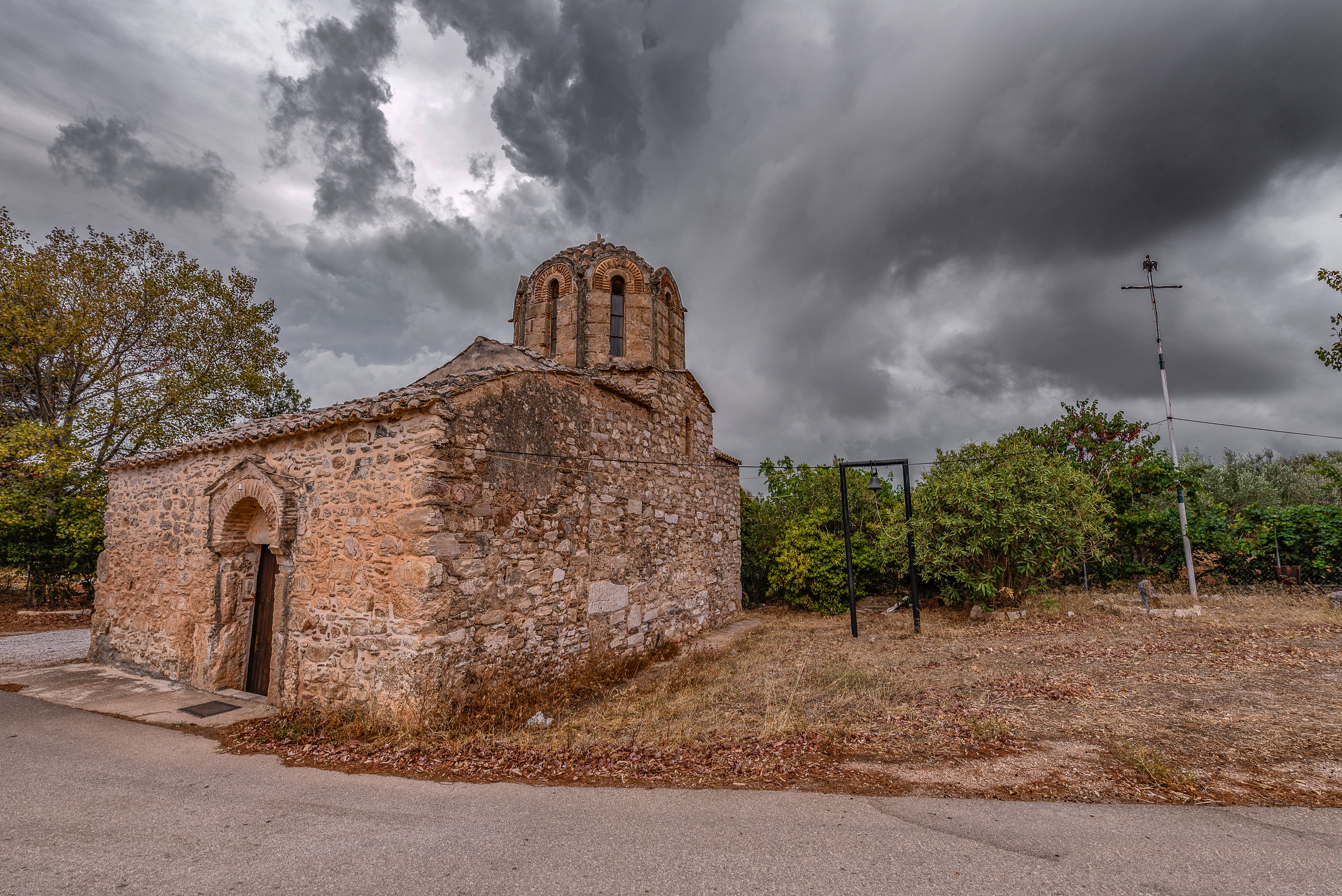
Panagia Mesosporitissa (Byzantine church)

Kalyvia Thorikou consists of two distinct parts: the main inland town Kalyvia and the coastal settlement, which is also referred to as Lagonisi. Kalyvia proper is situated on the south side of the Mesogaia plain, in the southeastern part of the Attica peninsula. There are several low mountains around Kalyvia Thorikou, including Mount Paneion to its south and Merenta to its northeast. Kalyvia Thorikou is 7 km northeast from the Saronic Gulf coast at Lagonisi, 5 km south of Markopoulo Mesogaias, 6 km northwest of Keratea and 24 km southeast of Athens city centre. The Greek National Road 89 (Gerakas - Koropi - Lavrio - Sounio) passes east of the town.

== Notable people ==
- Athena Manoukian, singer

== Sister cities ==
- (France) Garons
- (Cyprus) Mesa Geitonia
- (Italy) Villa Castelli

== See also ==
- List of municipalities of Attica
