= Telephone numbers in Greece =

- Country: Greece
- Continent: Europe
- Country code: 30
- International access: 00
- Long-distance: none

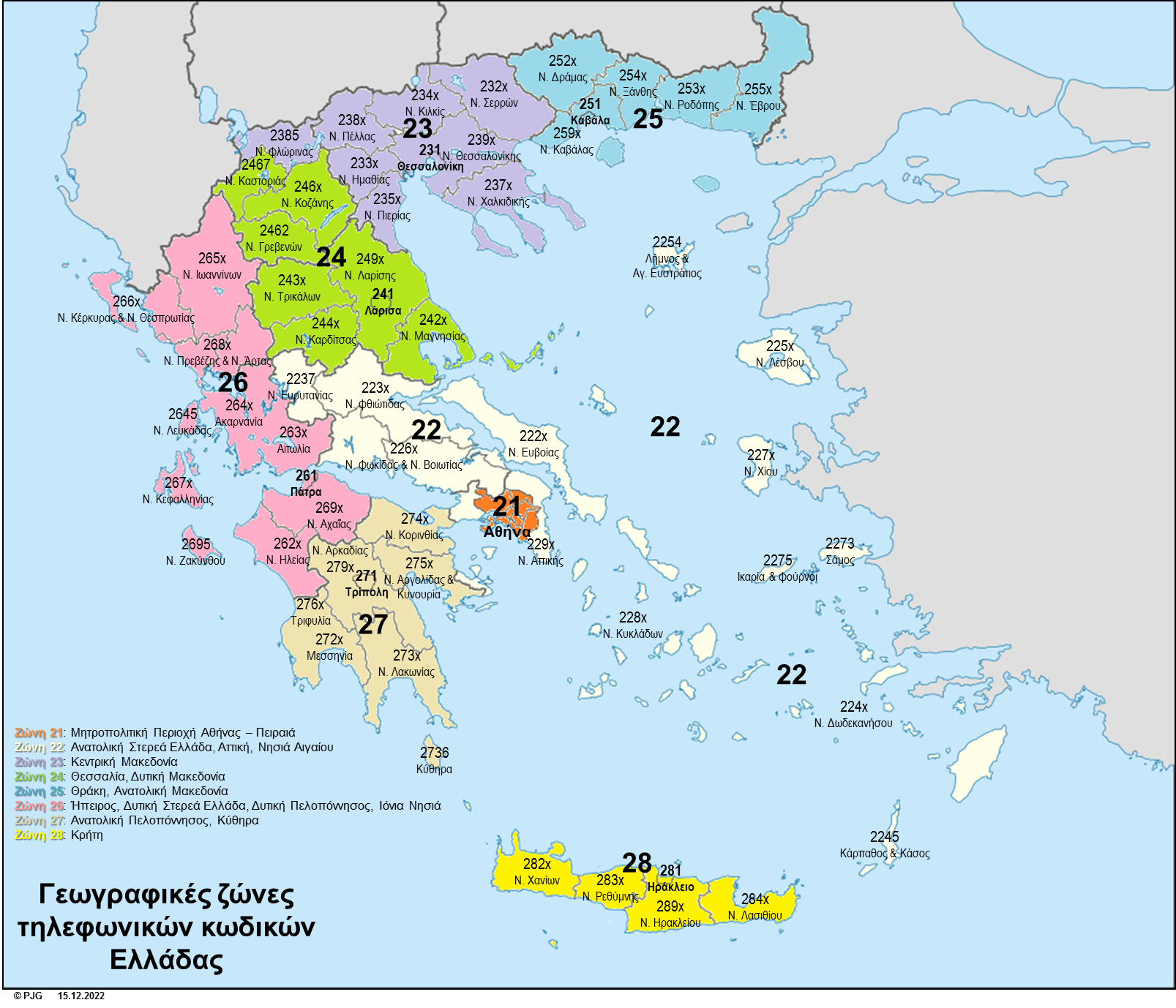
Map of geographical area codes in Greece

Greece has a national telephone numbering plan with ten-digit telephone numbers. The first digit represents the type of service. 1 is used for short codes, 2 for geographical numbers (3 and 4 are reserved for that purpose too), 5 is used for inter-network routing purposes (non-dialable codes) and VPNs, 6 for mobile services, 7 is reserved for universal access numbers (not active), 8 for reduced-fee services (like 800 toll-free, 801 local call, 89 dial-up and data services), 9 is used for premium rate services (901 for general purpose and 909 for adult-only services). All dialable numbers are ten digits, except for short codes (3–5 digits in the 1 range), 807-XXXX (seven digits) used for calling card access codes, and numbers in the 5 range, used for routing purposes and not dialable by end-subscribers.

== Overview ==
Geographical area codes start with the digit 2. There are currently two-, three-, and four-digit area codes. The only two-digit area code is 21 for the Athens Metropolitan area; three-digit codes are used for the cities of Thessaloniki, Patras, Larissa, Heraklion, Kavala, and Tripoli. The rest of the codes are four-digit codes.

Generally speaking, the second digit of a geographical area code signifies a broader geographical area of Greece. That is how area codes are sorted in this article.

Two-digit codes are used with eight-digit subscriber numbers, three-digit codes with seven-digit numbers, and four-digit codes with six-digit numbers, so that the full telephone number is always ten digits.

Subscriber numbers in most areas start with 0. That is the digit that was inserted between the area code and the subscriber number to form the new ten-digit numbering plan back in 2002. Thus, many Greeks erroneously think that the area codes include this leading 0. For example, they think that Athens's area code is 210 while, actually, Athens's area code is 21, with 0 being the first digit of the subscriber number.

Subscriber numbers starting with 0 are assigned to the former monopoly OTE. In bigger cities like Athens and Thessaloniki, subscriber numbers starting with digits other than 0 are becoming more and more common, especially amongst business subscribers. In this case, many people think that the area code is different. For example, a subscriber number in Athens might start with 211, with people thinking that 211 is a distinct area code from 210 while, in reality, both numbers are in the 21 area code and the third digit of the number belongs to the subscriber number.

In 2001-2002, Greece moved to a closed ten-digit numbering scheme in two stages, with the result that subscribers' numbers changed twice. For example, before the change, a number in Athens would have been dialed as follows:

xxx xxxx	(Athens numbers called within Athens)
(01) xxx xxxx	(Athens numbers called from within Greece)
+30 1 xxx xxxx	(Athens numbers called from outside Greece)

In 2001, a '0' was added after the area code, which was incorporated into the subscriber number:

01 0xxx xxxx	(Athens numbers called from within Greece)
+30 1 0xxx xxxx	(Athens numbers called from outside Greece)

Finally, in 2002, the leading '0' was changed to a '2' (for geographic numbers) :

21 x xxx xxxx	(Athens numbers called from within Greece)
+30 21 x xxx xxxx	(Athens numbers called from outside Greece)

For mobile phone numbers, the leading '0' was changed to a '6'.

Number portability may obscure the carrier responsible for geographical and non-geographical (mobile, toll-free, premium rate) numbers. All geographical codes (21x, 231x) end in a number from 0 to 6 (210 or 212 for Athens, 2310 or 2312 for Thessaloniki). Numbers whose code ends in "0" are or were originally operated by OTE. The same applies to mobile phones: All mobile codes (69x) end in 0,3,4,5,7,8 or 9 (690, 698). Mobile code "696" is assigned to OTE pagers. Numbers starting with 690 and 693 were originally assigned to WIND, with 694 and 695 to Vodafone, with 697 and 698 to Cosmote and with 699 to Q-Telecom until 2007 when it merged with WIND.

== Zone 21: Greater Athens Metropolitan Area ==
21 - (0-9)XXXXXXX Athens-Piraeus-Elefsina area

== Zone 22: Central Greece and the Aegean Islands ==
=== 222x - Evia ===
2221 - Chalkida City
2222 - Kymi
2223 - Aliveri
2224 - Karystos
2226 - Aidipsos
2227 - Mantoudi
2228 - Psachna
2229 - Eretria

=== 223x - Evrytania and Phthiotis ===
2231 - Lamia
2232 - Domokos
2233 - Atalanta
2234 - Amfikleia
2235 - Kamena Vourla
2236 - Spercheiada, Makrakomi
2237 - Karpenisi
2238 - Stylida

=== 224x - Dodecanese ===
2241 - Rhodes, Rhodes City
2242 - Kos and Nisyros islands
2243 - Kalymnos, Astypalaia
2244 - Rhodes Island, Archangelos Area
2245 - Karpathos and Kasos islands
2246 - Rhodes Island, Salakos Area - Chalki, Kastellorizo, Symi and Tilos islands
2247 - Agathonisi, Leros, Leipsoi and Patmos islands

=== 225x - Lesbos, Lemnos ===
2251 - Lesbos, Mytilini Area
2252 - Lesbos, Agiasos Area
2253 - Lesbos, Kalloni Area
2254 - Lemnos, Agios Efstratios

=== 226x - Boeotia, eastern Phocis ===
2261 - Livadia
2262 - Thiva
2263 - Dervenochoria, Villia
2264 - Thisvi
2265 - Amfissa
2266 - Lidoriki
2267 - Arachova, Distomo
2268 - Aliartos

=== 227x - Chios, Samos and Icaria islands ===
2271 - Chios, Town Area
2272 - Chios, Kardamyla Area
2273 - Samos
2274 - Chios, Volissos Area - Psara island
2275 - Ikaria, Fournoi island

=== 228x - Cyclades ===
2281 - Syros, including Kythnos, Serifos islands
2282 - Andros
2283 - Tinos
2284 - Paros and Sifnos islands
2285 - Amorgos and Naxos islands
2286 - Folegandros, Ios, Santorini and Sikinos islands
2287 - Kimolos and Milos
2288 - Kea Island
2289 - Mykonos

=== 229x - Attica, excluding the area that uses 21 ===
2291 - Lagonisi, Saronida, Anavyssos, Palaia Fokaia
2292 - Lavrio, Sounio
2293 - Agia Sotira
2294 - Rafina, Artemida, Marathonas
2295 - Afidnes
2296 - Megara, Kineta
2297 - Aigina
2298 - Troezen, Poros isl., Hydra isl., Spetses isl.
2299 - Markopoulo Mesogaias, Kalyvia Thorikou

== Zone 23: Central Macedonia and Florina ==
=== 231 - Thessaloniki ===
231 - (0-9)XXXXXX Thessaloniki

=== 232x - Serres prefecture ===
2321 - Serres
2322 - Nigrita
2323 - Sidirokastro
2324 - Nea Zichni
2325 - Heraklia
2327 - Rodopoli

=== 233x - Imathia prefecture ===
2331 - Veria (Verroia)
2332 - Naoussa
2333 - Alexandria

=== 234x - Kilkis prefecture ===
2341 - Kilkis
2343 - Polykastro

=== 235x - Pieria prefecture ===
2351 - Katerini
2352 - Litochoro
2353 - Aiginio

=== 237x - Chalkidiki prefecture ===
2371 - Polygyros
2372 - Arnaia
2373 - Nea Moudania
2374 - Potidaia
2375 - Nikiti
2376 - Stratoni
2377 - Ierissos, Mount Athos

=== 238x - Pella and Florina prefectures ===
2381 - Edessa
2382 - Giannitsa
2384 - Aridaia
2385 - Florina
2386 - Amyntaio

=== 239x - parts of Chalkidiki and Thessaloniki prefectures ===
2391 - Chalkidona
2392 - Peraia
2393 - Lagkadikia
2394 - Lagkadas
2395 - Sochos
2396 - Vasilika
2397 - Asprovalta
2399 - Nea Kallikrateia

236x is not used.

== Zone 24: Thessaly and West Macedonia (excluding Florina) ==
=== 241 - Larissa area ===
241 - (0-7)XXXXXX Larissa (and area)

=== 242x - Magnesia including the Northern Sporades ===
2421 - Volos
2422 - Almyros
2423 - Kala Nera
2424 - Skopelos
2425 - Velestino
2426 - Zagora
2427 - Skiathos
2428 - Keramidi, suburban Volos

=== 243x - Trikala prefecture ===
- 2431 - Trikala
- 2432 - Kalampaka
- 2433 - Farkadona
- 2434 - Pyli

=== 244x - Karditsa ===
2441 - Karditsa
2443 - Sofades
2444 - Palamas
2445 - Mouzaki

=== 246x - West Macedonia excluding the Florina area ===
2461 - Kozani
2462 - Grevena
2463 - Ptolemaida
2464 - Servia
2465 - Siatista
2467 - Kastoria
2468 - Neapoli

=== 249x - Larissa prefecture except for the Larissa area ===
2491 - Farsala
2492 - Tyrnavos
2493 - Elassona
2494 - Agia
2495 - Makrychori

245x, 247x and 248x are not used.

== Zone 25: East Macedonia and Thrace ==
=== 251 - Kavala area ===
251: Kavala or Kavalla

=== 252x - Drama prefecture ===
2521 - Drama
2522 - Prosotsani
2523 - Kato Nevrokopi
2524 - Paranesti

=== 253x - Rhodope prefecture ===
2531 - Komotini
2532 - Sapes
2533 - Xylagani
2534 - Iasmos
2535 - Nea Kallisti

=== 254x- Xanthi prefecture ===
2541 - Xanthi
2542 - Stavroupoli
2544 - Echinos

=== 255x - Evros Prefecture ===
2551: Alexandroupolis
2552: Orestiada
2553 - Didymoteicho
2554 - Soufli
2555 - Feres
2556 - Kyprinos

=== 259x - Kavala prefecture except for the Kavala area ===
2591 - Chrysoupoli
2592 - Eleftheroupoli
2593 - Thasos
2594 - Nea Peramos, Kavala

256x through 258x are not used.

== Zone 26: West Greece, Ionian Island and Epirus ==
=== 261 - Patras and Area ===
261 - Patras (and area)

=== 262x - Ileias Prefecture ===
2621 - Pyrgos
2622 - Amaliada
2623 - Lechaina
2624 - Olympia
2625 - Krestena
2626 - Andritsaina

=== 263x - Aetolia and western Phocis ===
2631 - Missolonghi
2632 - Etoliko
2634 - Nafpaktos
2635 - Mataranga, Aetolia-Acarnania

=== 264x - Acarnania, Lefkada ===
2641 - Agrinio
2642 - Amfilochia
2643 - Vonitsa
2644 - Thermo
2645 - Lefkada
2646 - Astakos
2647 - Fyteies

=== 265x - Ioannina Prefecture ===
2651 - Ioannina
2653 - Asprangeloi
2654 - Metamorfosi
2655 - Konitsa
2656 - Metsovo
2657 - Delvinaki
2658 - Zitsa
2659 - Kalentzi

=== 266x - Corfu prefecture and Thesprotia ===
2661 - Corfu (city)
2662 - Lefkimmi
2663 - Northern Corfu
2664 - Filiates
2665 - Igoumenitsa
2666 - Paramythia

=== 267x - Kefalonia ===
2671 - Argostoli (central and western Kefalonia)
2674 - Sami (Eastern Kefalonia and Ithaca)

=== 268x - Arta and Preveza ===
2681 - Arta
2682 - Preveza
2683 - Filippiada
2684 - Kanalaki
2685 - Athamania

=== 269x - Achaea (except Patras) and Zakynthos ===
2691 - Aegion/Aigion
2692 - Kalavryta
2693 - Kato Achaia
2694 - Chalandritsa
2695 - the island of Zakynthos
2696 - Akrata

== Zone 27: Peloponnese and Kythera ==
=== 271 - Tripoli and area ===
271: Tripoli (and area)

=== 272x - southern and eastern part of Messenia ===
2721 - Kalamata
2722 - Messene
2723 - Pylos
2724 - Meligalas
2725 - Koroni

=== 273x - Laconia and Kythera ===
2731: Sparta
2732: Monemvasia
2733: Gythio
2734: Neapoli
2735: Skala
2736: Kythera

=== 274x - Corinthia ===
2741 - Corinth (and area)
2742 - Kiato
2743 - Xylokastro
2744 - Loutraki
2746 - Nemea
2747 - Stymfalia

=== 275x - eastern Arcadia and Argolis ===
2751 - Argos
2752 - Nafplio
2753 - Lygourio
2754 - Kranidi
2755 - Astros
2757 - Leonidio

=== 276x - Messenia ===
2761 - Kyparissia
2763 - Gargalianoi
2765 - Kopanaki

=== 279x - Western Arcadia ===
2791 - Megalopoli
2792 - Kastri Kynourias
2795 - Vytina
2796 - Levidi
2797 - Tropaia

277x and 278x are not used.

== Zone 28: Crete ==
=== 281 - Heraklion prefecture ===
281 - Heraklion (and area)

=== 282x - Chania prefecture ===
2821 - Chania
2822 - Kissamos
2823 - Kantanos
2824 - Kolymvari
2825 - Apokoronas

=== 283x - Rethymno prefecture ===
2831 - Rethymno
2832 - Spyli
2833 - Amari
2834 - Perama Mylopotamou

=== 284x - Lasithi ===
2841 - Agios Nikolaos
2842 - Ierapetra
2843 - Siteia
2844 - Tzermadio

=== 289x - rest of Heraklion prefecture ===
2891 - Arkalochori
2892 - Moires
2893 - Asterousia
2894 - Agia Varvara
2895 - Ano Viannos
2897 - Limenas Chersonisou

285x through 288x are not used.

== Non-geographic numbers ==
Note: emergency numbers in bold.

100 - Hellenic Police
101x up to 103x
105x up to 107x
102xx up to 107xx
108 - Hellenic Coast Guard
109 - Hellenic Police - Drug Enforcement
110xx
11085 - Thessaloniki Urban Transport Organization (OASTH)
111xx
11188 - Cyber Crime Division of Hellenic Policy
11185 - Transport for Athens
110x, 111x
112 - European emergency number
113xx up to 116xx
113x up to 118x
116xxx - Pan-European numbers
117xx
118xx - Directory services
119
12x, 12xx, 13x, 13xx - Network customer services (specific to each carrier)
137xx - Toll Free Technical Support (free from all carriers)
13777 Yuboto Telephony Support
138xx - Customer service and sales for telephone companies (accessible from all networks)
13890 - Inter Telecom
14xx - Telephone companies' music voice portals
140xx
142xx up to 149xx- Information services (weather, news etc.)
15xx - National public services (public sector numbers)
151xx up to 156xx
1591 - Forest Protection Coordination Centre of the General Directorate of Forests and Forest Environment
1571 - Hellenic Police. A service available in Greek, English, French and German. Greek and foreign tourists can use it to solve problems they may encounter.
159xx
166 - EKAV (National Immediate Assistance Centre)
170 - Special Suppressive Anti-Terrorist Unit
171 - Tourist Police
186x up to 189x
181xx, 182xx, 183xx - Short codes for private companies
188xx - Short codes for private companies
196x - National public services (public sector numbers)
190xx up to 195xx
197 - National Centre for Social Solidarity (EKKA)
199 - Hellenic Fire Service

50x xxx xxxx - VPNs
54xxx
559xx

685 185 xxxx - CYTA Hellas
685 19x xxxx - CYTA Hellas
685 500 xxxx - CYTA Hellas
685 505 xxxx - CYTA Hellas
685 550 xxxx - CYTA Hellas
685 555 xxxx - CYTA Hellas
685 585 xxxx - CYTA Hellas
690 000 xxxx - BWS
690 002 xxxx - Nova (Forthnet)
690 003 xxxx - Nova (Forthnet)
690 069 xxxx - Nova (Forthnet)
690 100 xxxx - MI CARRIER SERVICES AB
690 200 xxxx - MI CARRIER SERVICES AB
690 300 xxxx - MI CARRIER SERVICES AB
690 400 xxxx - MI CARRIER SERVICES AB
690 500 xxxx - MI CARRIER SERVICES AB
690 555 xxxx - AMD Telecom S.A.
690 6xx xxxx - Nova (formerly WIND Hellas)
690 7xx xxxx - Nova (formerly WIND Hellas)
690 8xx xxxx - Nova (formerly WIND Hellas)
690 9xx xxxx - Nova (formerly WIND Hellas)
691 000 xxxx - BWS
691 111 xxxx - Interconnect
691 200 xxxx - Yuboto LTD
691 234 xxxx - M-Stat
691 300 xxxx - Viva
691 345 xxxx - Nova (Forthnet)
691 400 xxxx - AMD Telecom S.A.
691 500 xxxx - My Company Projects
691 600 xxxx - Compatel Limited
691 691 xxxx - Mobile Media
691 700 xxxx - Inter Telecom
691 888 xxxx - Hellenic Railways Organisation (OSE)
693 xxx xxxx - Nova (formerly WIND Hellas)
694 xxx xxxx - Vodafone Greece
695 000 xxxx up to 695 199 xxxx - Vodafone Greece
695 200 xxxx - Compatel Limited
695 205 xxxx - Mobile One Limited
695 210 xxxx - MI CARRIER SERVICES AB
695 290 xxxx - MI CARRIER SERVICES AB
695 299 xxxx - BWS
695 30x xxxx - CYTA Hellas
695 310 xxxx - MI CARRIER SERVICES AB
695 330 xxxx - Apifon
695 340 xxxx - AMD Telecom S.A.
695 400 xxxx - AMD Telecom S.A.
695 410 xxxx - MI CARRIER SERVICES AB
695 423 xxxx - Infobip
695 490 xxxx - MI CARRIER SERVICES AB
695 500 xxxx up to 695 999 xxxx - Vodafone Greece
696 01x xxxx - OTE
696 91x xxxx - Ministry of National Defense
696 921 xxxx up to 696 928 xxxx - Ministry of National Defense
697 xxx xxxx - Cosmote
698 xxx xxxx - Cosmote
699 00x xxxx - Nova (formerly WIND Hellas)
699 1xx xxxx up to 699 999 xxxx - Nova (formerly WIND Hellas)

70x xxx xxxx - Universal Personal Number Service

800 xxx xxxx - Toll-free numbers
801 xxx xxxx - “ONEphone” shared-cost services (local call charges apply nationwide)
806 xxx xxxx - Calls with maximum charge of 0.06 EUR/minute
807 xxxx - Phonecard services
812 xxx xxxx - Calls with maximum charge of 0.12 EUR/minute
825 xxx xxxx - Calls with maximum charge of 0.25 EUR/minute
850 xxx xxxx - Calls with maximum charge of 0.50 EUR/minute
875 xxx xxxx - Calls with maximum charge of 0.75 EUR/minute

896 xxx xxxx & 899 xxx xxxx - Data services (Dial-up Internet access, Hellaspac packet relay, ERMES email etc.)

901 xxx xxxx - Premium-rate services
909 xxx xxxx - Premium-rate adult-only services

=== Defunct ===
The following defunct short codes were created and provided for free by OTE during its monopoly on the Greek telephony market.

104 - Automobile and Touring Club of Greece (ELPA) Roadside Assistance.

131 - OTE directory service. Terminated according to the provisions of the 2002 National Numbering Plan and replaced by multiple 5-digit premium-rate codes.

141 - Greece Time. Established in 1963 as two-digit 14.

184 - IKA appointments.

185 - Transport for Athens. Became 11185.

191 - Forestry Service.

== See also ==
- Telephone numbers in Europe
- OTE
