= Palaia Fokaia =

Palaia Fokaia Παλαιά Φώκαια
- Municipal unit
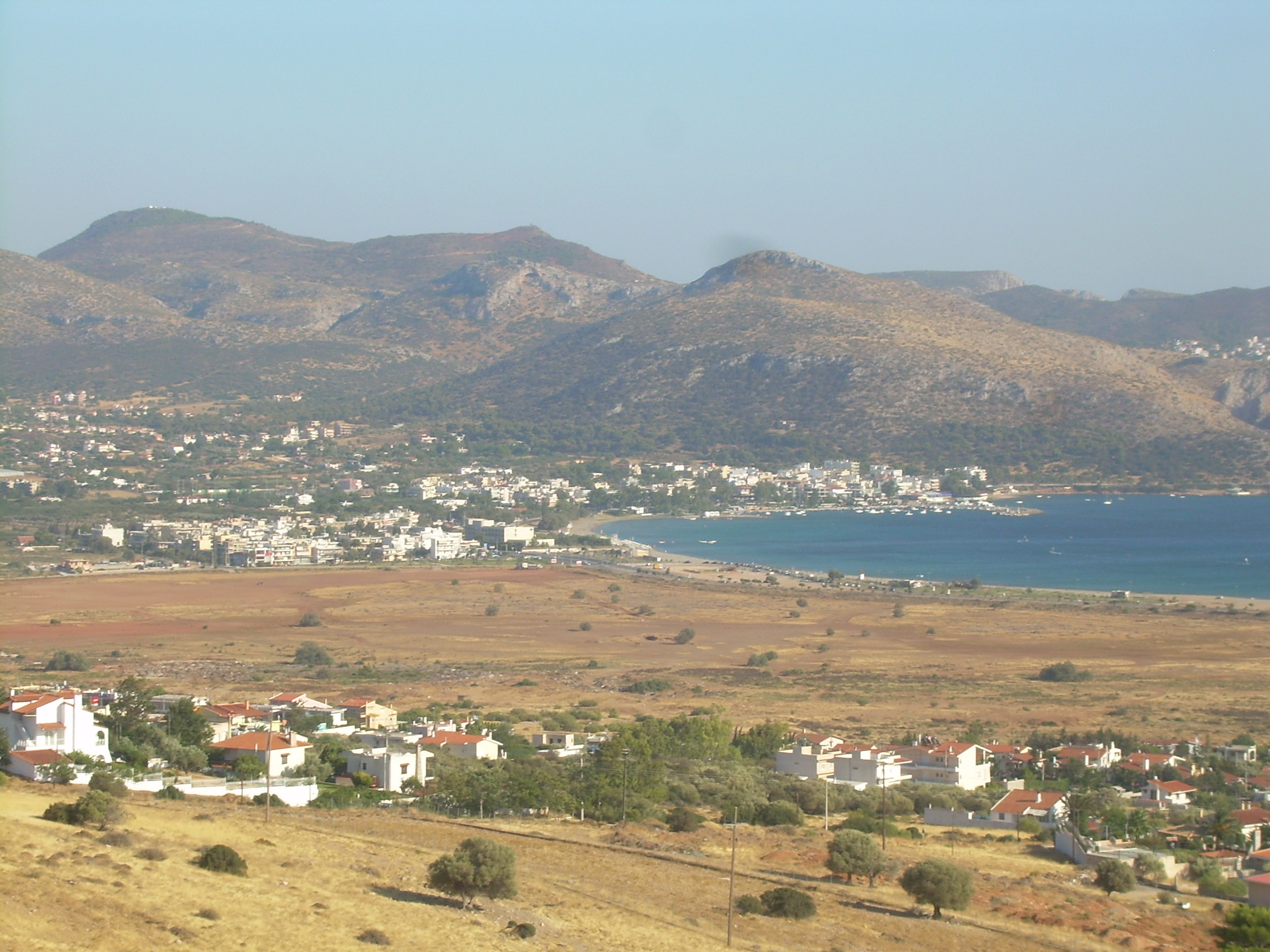
- View of Palaia Fokaia

- Location within the regional unit

- Location within Greece
- Coordinates: 37°43′N 23°57′E
- Country: Greece
- Administrative region: Attica
- Regional unit: East Attica
- Municipality: Saronikos

Area
  - Municipal unit: 22.944 km^{2} (8.859 sq mi)
- Elevation: 6 m (20 ft)

Population (2021)
  - Municipal unit: 3,025
  - Municipal unit density: 131.8/km^{2} (341.5/sq mi)
- Time zone: UTC+2 (EET)
  - Summer (DST): UTC+3 (EEST)
- Postal code: 190 xx
- Area code: 22910
- Vehicle registration: Z
- Website: www.palaiafokaia.gr

Palaia Fokaia (Greek: Παλαιά Φώκαια) is a former community and a seaside town in East Attica, Greece. Since the 2011 local government reform it is part of the municipality Saronikos, of which it is a municipal unit. The municipal unit has an area of 22.944 km^{2}. Its population was 3,025 at the 2021 census.

Currently, Palaia Fokaia includes the settlements of: Thymari - Agia Fotini, Katafygi and the settlement of the Agricultural Bank of Greece.

== Geography ==
Palaia Fokaia is located on the Saronic Gulf coast, in the southeastern part of the Attica peninsula. There are low mountains south and east of the town. It lies 2 km south of Anavyssos, 9 km west of Lavrio and 36 km southeast of Athens city centre. Greek National Road 91 (Athens - Sounio) passes through the town.

The municipal unit includes the village of Thymari (pop. 515) and the small, rocky and deforested island of Patroklos, which is uninhabited.

== Historical population ==
Year	Village population	Community population
1981	1,430	-
1991	1,631	2,051
2001	2,436	3,123
2011	2,713	3,436
2021	2,510	3,025

== See also ==
- List of municipalities of Attica
