= Pleiae =

Coordinates: 36°52′32″N 22°48′09″E

Pleiae or Pleiai (Ancient Greek: Πλεῖαι), also known as Palaea or Palaia (Παλαιά), was a town of ancient Laconia, mentioned by Livy as the place where Nabis pitched his camp in 192 BCE. It must have been situated in the plain of Leuce, which lay between Acriae and Asopus. The name of the place occurs in an inscription.

Its site is located southwest of the modern Apidea.
