= Saronikos, Attica =

Saronikos Σαρωνικός
- Municipality
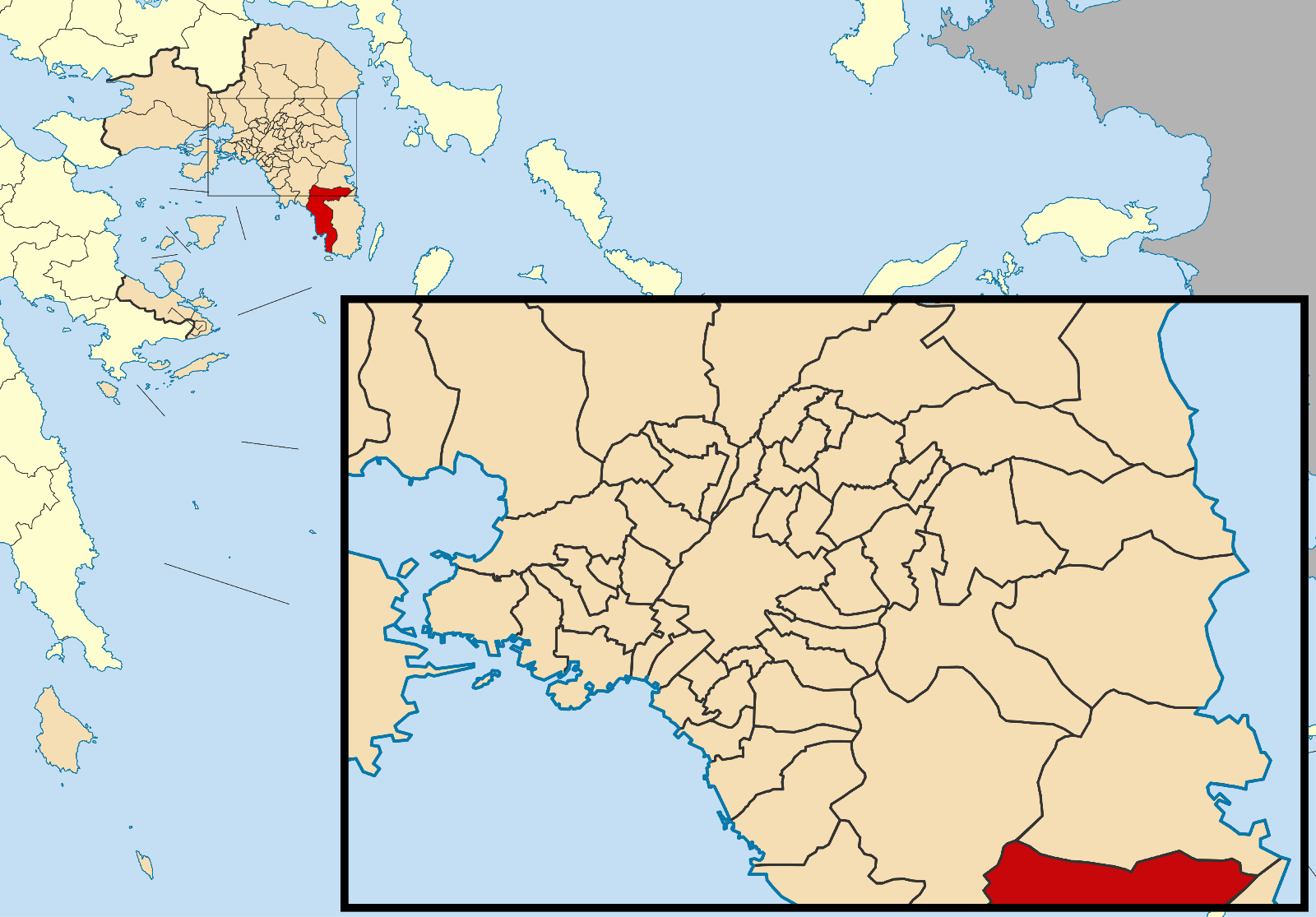

- Location within Greece
- Coordinates: 37°50′N 23°55′E
- Country: Greece
- Administrative region: Attica
- Regional unit: East Attica
- Seat: Kalyvia Thorikou

Government
  - Mayor: Dimitrios Papachristou (since 2023)

Area
  - Municipality: 139.099 km^{2} (53.706 sq mi)

Population (2021)
  - Municipality: 30,047
  - Density: 216.01/km^{2} (559.47/sq mi)
- Time zone: UTC+2 (EET)
  - Summer (DST): UTC+3 (EEST)

Saronikos (Greek: Σαρωνικός) is a municipality in the East Attica regional unit, Attica, Greece. The seat of the municipality is the town Kalyvia Thorikou. The municipality has an area of 139.099 km^{2}.

== Municipality ==
The municipality Saronikos was formed at the 2011 local government reform by the merger of the following 5 former municipalities, that became municipal units:

- Anavyssos
- Kalyvia Thorikou
- Kouvaras
- Palaia Fokaia
- Saronida
