= Philaea =

Town on the coast of ancient Cilicia

Coordinates: 36°15′03″N 33°48′31″E

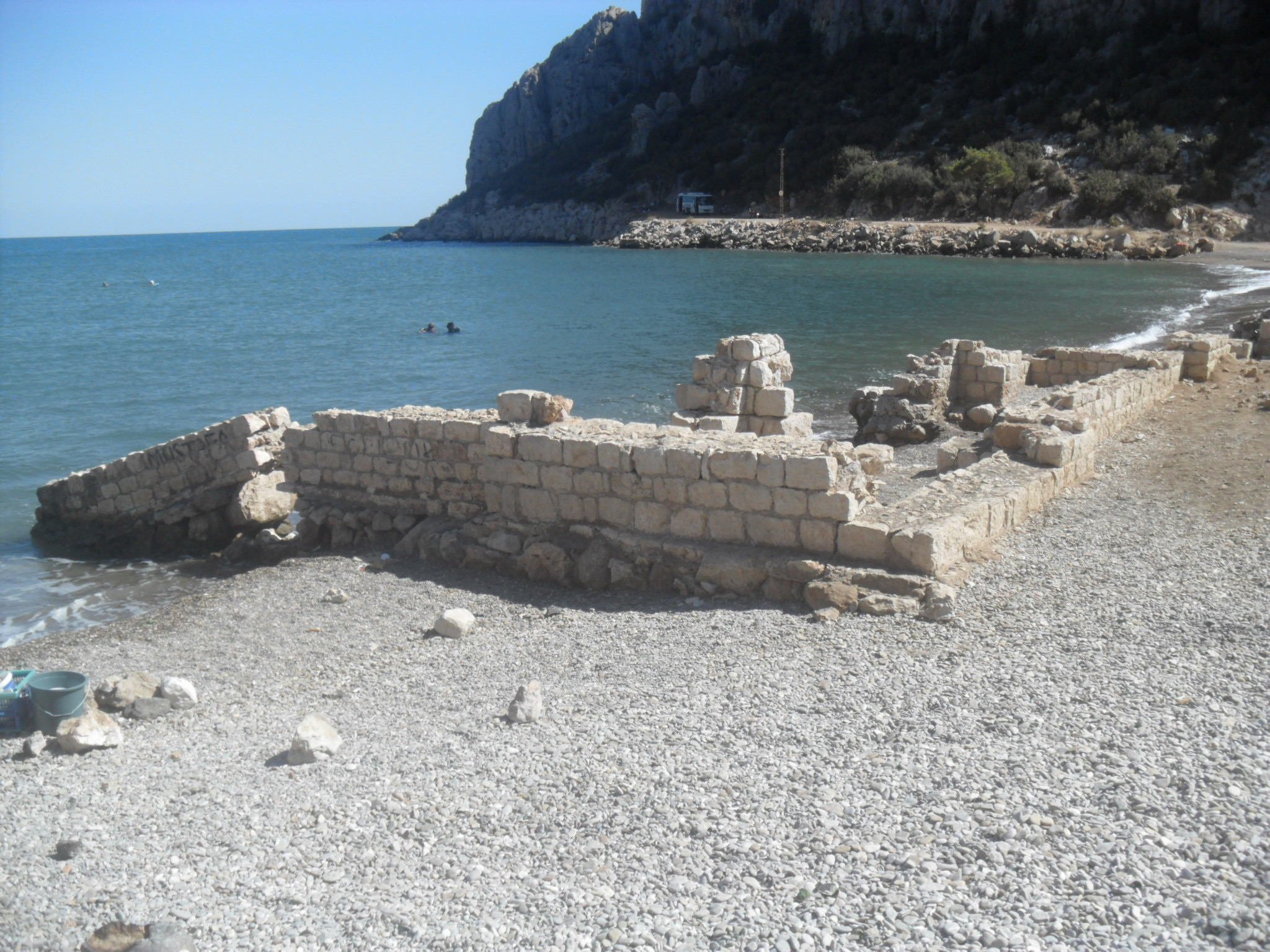
The beach

Philaea or Philaia (Ancient Greek: Φιλαία), also called Palaeae or Palaiai and Palaea or Palaia, was a town on the coast of ancient Cilicia mentioned in the Stadiasmus Maris Magni.

Its site is located near Tahta Limanı (on Eğribük bay) in Asiatic Turkey. Although there are very few ruins, an underwater survey reveals that most of the ruins are submerged in the water. There is also a necropolis. Judging from the grave types it is believed that Philaea was a Roman town.
