= Medeon (Phocis) =

- Μεδεών (Ancient Greek) (Greek)
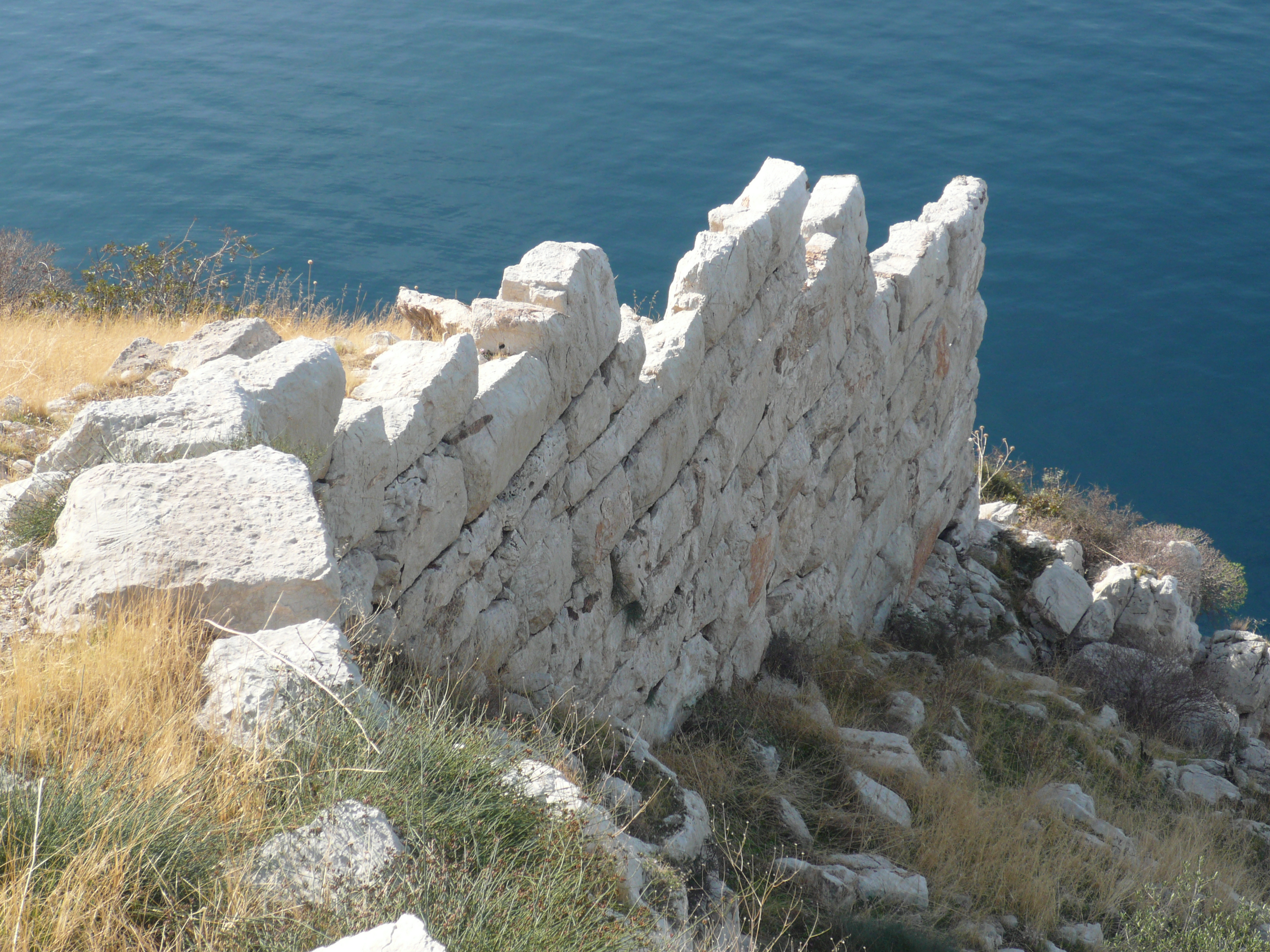
- Portion of Medeon's city wall still standing.

- Location within Greece
- 38°22′03″N 22°40′58″E
- Type: Ruins of a walled city
- Location: Agioi Theodoroi hill
- Region: East coast of the Gulf of Antikyra
- Part of: Ancient Phocis, modern Steiri in Distomo, Voiotia

History
- Abandoned: 346 BCE

Site notes
- Height: 51 metres (167 ft)
- Excavation dates: 1907, 1962-63
- Archaeologists: Georgios Sotiriadis, J. Constantinou
- Owner: Republic of Greece
- Management: Ministry of Culture and Sports, 10th Ephorate of Prehistoric and Classical Antiquities
- Public access: Always open

Medeon (Ancient Greek: Μεδεών) was a town of ancient Phocis, destroyed by Philip II of Macedon along with the other Phocian towns at the termination of the Third Sacred War (in 346 BCE), and never again restored. Strabo places it on the Crissaean Gulf (in the sense of the Gulf of Corinth), at the distance of 160 stadia from Boeotia; and Pausanias says that it was near Antikyra. According to ancient writers it was named after Medeon the son of Electra and Pylades.

== Geography of the site ==
The certain remains of the town's fortified acropolis have been discovered on a steep hill called Agioi Theodoroi from the church also on the hill (not to be confused with the town of Agioi Theodoroi in Corinthia). The hill is an outcrop on the east side of the Gulf of Antikyra with a view across the water to Antikyra, also a town of ancient Phocis. Today, however, since the 2011 Kallikrates reform, both locations are in the newly created prefecture of Voiotia, Distomo-Arachova-Antikyra. The ruins of Medeon are in the village of Steiri, a part of Distomo.

The east side of the gulf is a steeply rising wall. A floor along the gulf supports the road from Paralia Distomou ("Beach of Distomo") to an aluminum factory that mines bauxite from the hills and renders it into the metal. Agioi Theodoroi is the bottom of a ridge of Mount Amalia extending into the gulf and abrogating the narrow floor region, which begins again on the other side of the ridge. The road is thus forced to cross the ridge, which it does to the east of the archaeological site. East of the road, the slopes of Mount Amalia rise to a knob of about 830 metres (2,720 ft), around which are buildings and roads. The hilly terrain is open forest laced with olive.

== Excavation of the site ==
The first excavations on the hill were carried out by Georgios Sotiriadis in 1907. Additional rescue archaeology was carried out for several months of 1962-63 by the French School of Archaeology (which had also excavated Delphi) under a Greek official, the ephor, J. Constantinou. The need came from the bauxite mining operations of the then newly constructed aluminum factory in the valley to the south of the hill. The 1960s excavation did not include the acropolis but concentrated on an ancient cemetery near it, which turned out to contain artifacts from the Middle Helladic period (2100-1600 BCE) to the 2nd century BCE. A beehive tomb (tholos) with a small side room has also been discovered. Additionally, the fortification walls, which were built in the 4th century BCE, were examined.

== History of the ancient settlement ==
=== Partial sympoliteia of Medeon and Stiris ===
An inscription is preserved dating from the 2nd century BCE regarding a political and religious union (sympoliteia) between Medeon and Stiris, in which both cities had the approval of the Phocian League. The agreement was inscribed on a stele inside the temple of Athena Cranea, in the city of Elateia. The stele preserves the name of the League's strategos, Zeuxis; in addition a sealed copy was to be guarded by a citizen of Lilaea named Trason and there were three persons who acted as witnesses from different Phocian cities: Tithorea, Elateia, and Lilaea. The union included the sanctuaries, the territory, the polis and the ports.

From the formalization of the treaty, the Medeonites will be with the Stirisians in conditions of equality and will have assemblies and common magistrates. It is not a complete merger of both cities: Stiris is the main city but the citizens of Medeon could designate a hierotamias who would make sacrifices according to the law of Medeon and who would have judicial competency together with the archons of Stiris and could vote. Those who have been magistrates in Medeon will not be required to be so in Stiris unless they decided voluntarily. The administration of the Medeonite sanctuaries will be carried out according to the law of Medeon, and the territory will be common.

== Gallery ==
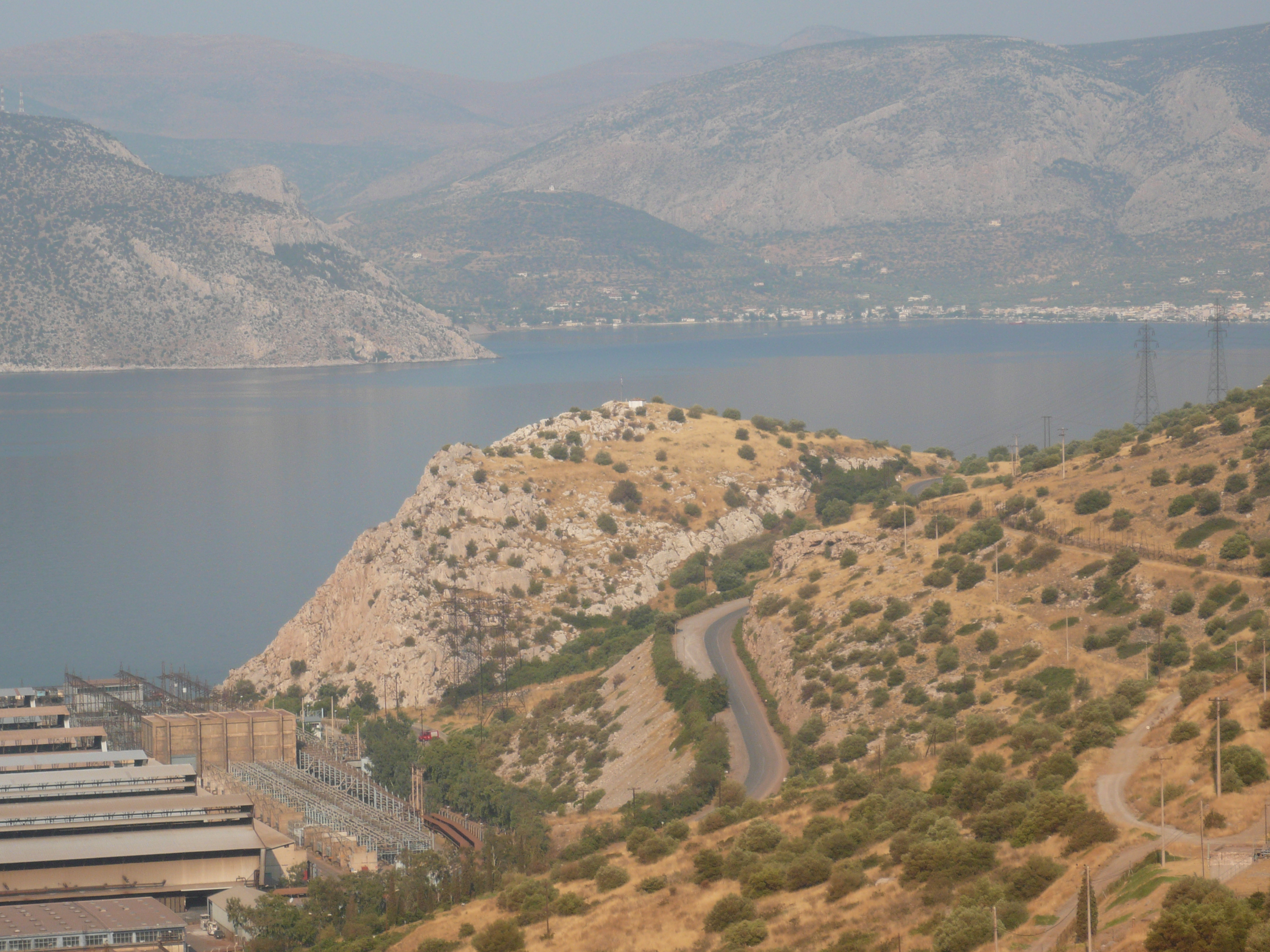
Background:Gulf of Antikyra. Foregound, left to right, aluminum factory, hill of Agioi Theodoroi, Mount Amalia

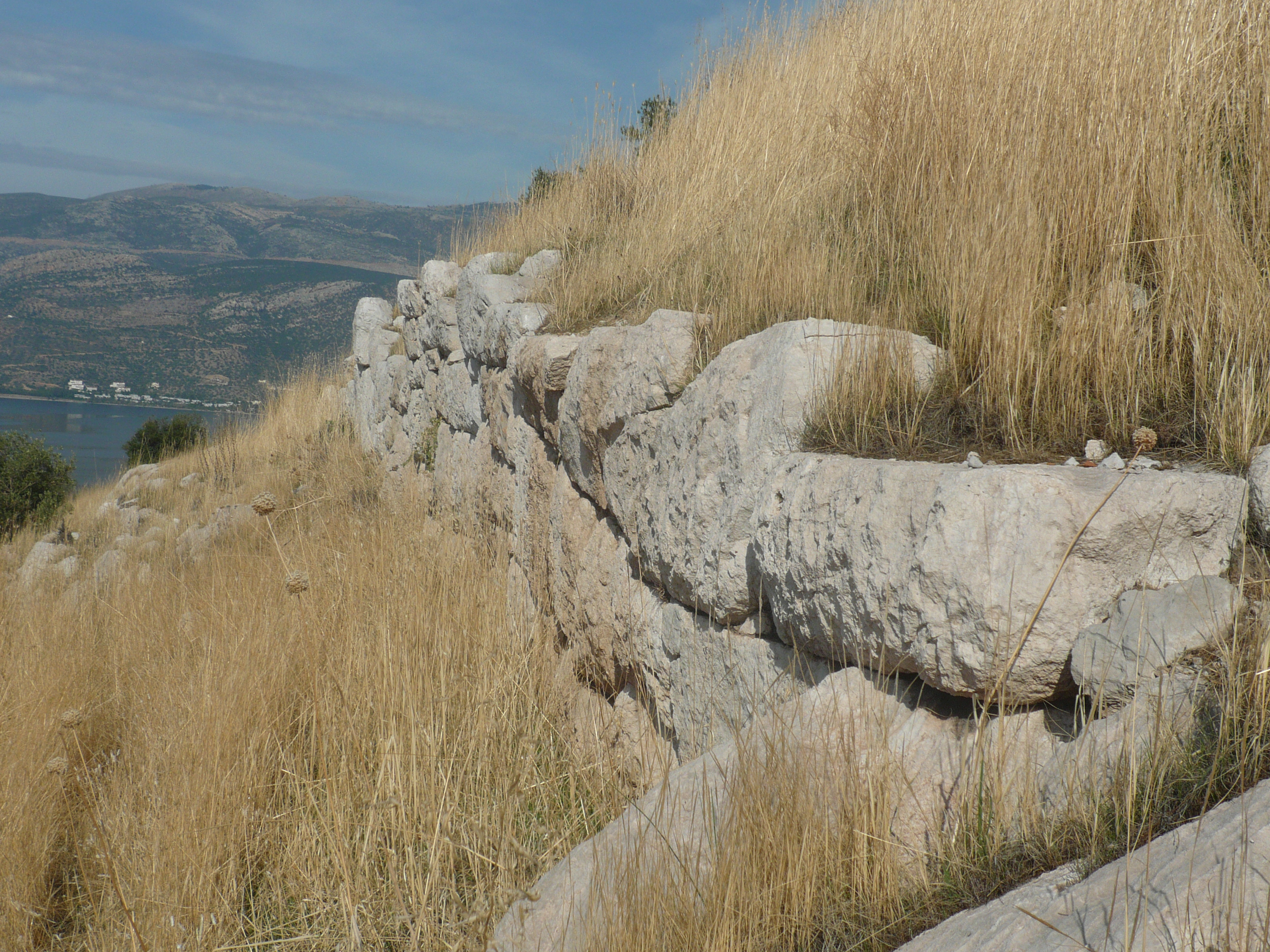
City wall, south flank of Agioi Theodoroi

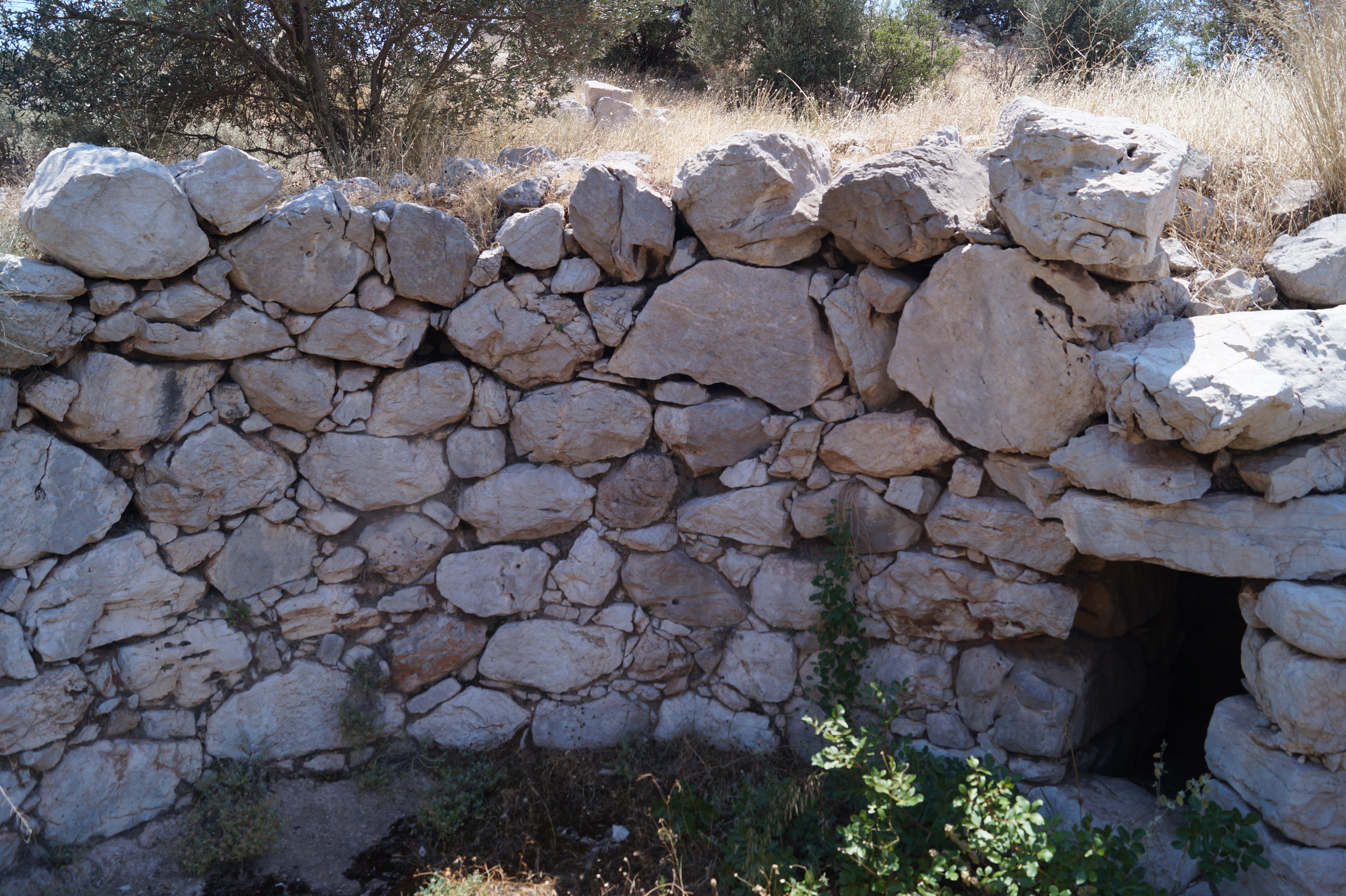
Remains of tholos tomb, south flank of Mount Amalia
