= Stiris =

Ancient Phocian town

Coordinates: 38°23′06″N 22°45′25″E

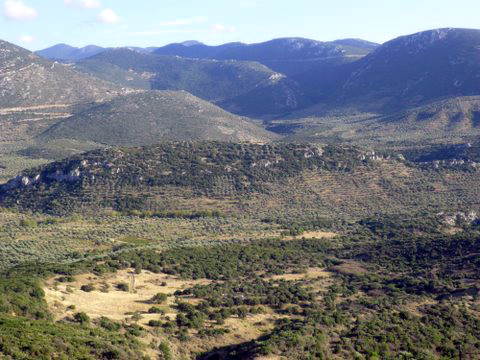
Hill where the remains of Stiris are located.

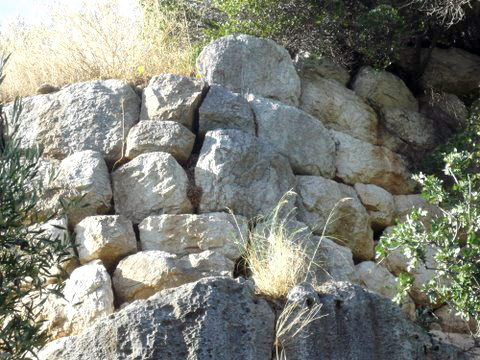
Ruins of Stiris.

Stiris (Greek: Στῖρις) or Steiris (Στείρις) was a town of ancient Phocis situated 120 stadia from Chaeroneia, the road between the two places running across the mountains. The inhabitants of Stiris claimed descent from an Athenian colony of the Attic demus of Steiria, led by Peteus, when he was driven out of Attica by Aegeus. Pausanias describes the city as situated upon a rocky summit, with only a few wells, which did not supply water fit for drinking, which the inhabitants obtained from a fountain, four stadia below the city, to which fountain there was a descent excavated among the rocks. The city contained in the time of Pausanias a temple of Demeter Stiritis, made of crude brick, containing two statues, one of Pentelic marble, the other of ancient workmanship, covered with bandages. Stiris was one of the Phocian cities destroyed by Philip II of Macedon at the close of the Third Sacred War; but it was afterwards rebuilt and was inhabited at the time of the visit of Pausanias.

An inscription is preserved dating from the 2nd century BCE regarding a political and religious union (sympoliteia) between Medeon and Stiris, in which both cities had the approval of the Phocian League. The agreement was inscribed on a stele inside the temple of Athena Cranea, in the city of Elateia. The stele preserves the name of the League's strategos, Zeuxis; in addition a sealed copy was to be guarded by a citizen of Lilaea named Trason and there were three persons who acted as witnesses from different Phocian cities: Tithorea, Elateia, and Lilaea. The union included the sanctuaries, the territory, the polis and the ports.

From the formalization of the treaty the Medeonites will be with the Stirisians in conditions of equality and will have assemblies and common magistrates. It is not a complete merger of both cities: Stiris is the main city but the citizens of Medeon could designate a hierotamias who would make sacrifices according to the law of Medeon and who would have judicial competency together with the archons of Stiris and could vote. Those who have been magistrates in Medeon will not be required to be so in Stiris unless they decided voluntarily. The administration of the Medeonite sanctuaries will be carried out according to the law of Medeon, and the territory will be common.

The location of ancient Stiris is near the modern village of Steiri, where its remains are found on a hill called Palaiochora, located southwest of Livadeia and southeast of Distomo.
