= Giorgos Ch. Theocharis =

Greek writer

Giorgos Ch. Theocharis (Greek: Γιώργος Χ. Θεοχάρης) is a Greek novelist, poet and writer.

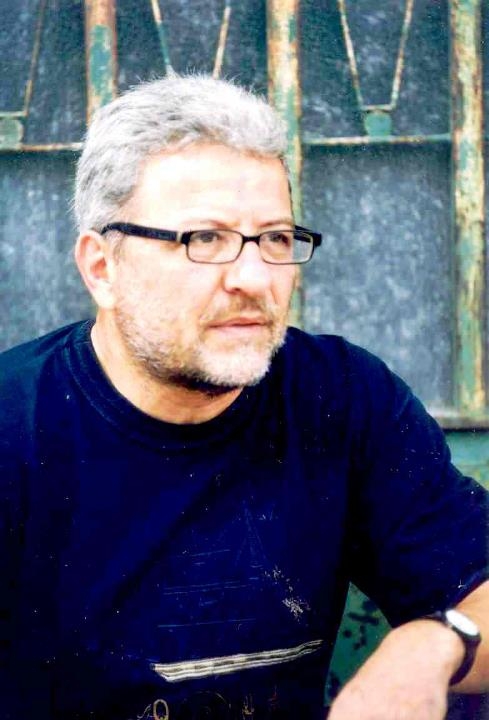
Γιώργος Χ. Θεοχάρης

== Biography ==
He is born 1951 in Desfina in Phocis, and since 1965 has lived in Aspra Spitia. For many years he worked in the Aluminium of Greece factory.

He is a member of the Greek Society of Authors, and in 1988 became director of the literary magazine Emvolimon. He is of the editors of Book Press.

He speaks French.

== Bibliography ==
His poems, essays and literary reviews published in Greece and in other countries. His poems were translated into French, English and Latin American.

- Poor Mineral (Πτωχόν Μετάλευμα), Ed. Emvolimon, 1990,
- Rotation (Αμειψισπορά), Ed. Levadeia Central Public Library, 1996,
- Enthymion (Ενθύμιον), Ed. Kastaniotis, 2004
- In memory (Από μνήμης), Ed. Melani, Athens 2010.
- Distomo: 10th of June 1944 – The Holocaust, Ed. Bookstore "Sygxroni Ekfrasi", 2010. In Greek State Literature Prizes for 2011, the Travel Literature Prize was granted to Giorgos Ch. Theocharis for his work.

== See also ==
- List of Greek writers
