= Antikyra (disambiguation) =

Antikyra or Anticyra (ancient Greek: Αντίκυρα) may refer to:

- Antikyra, a city in Boeotia (anciently in Phocis), Greece
- Anticyra (Thessaly), a town of ancient Thessaly, Greece
- Anticyra (Locris), a spurious town of ancient Locris, Greece
