= Paralia Distomou =

Aspra Spitia Άσπρα Σπίτια
- Settlement
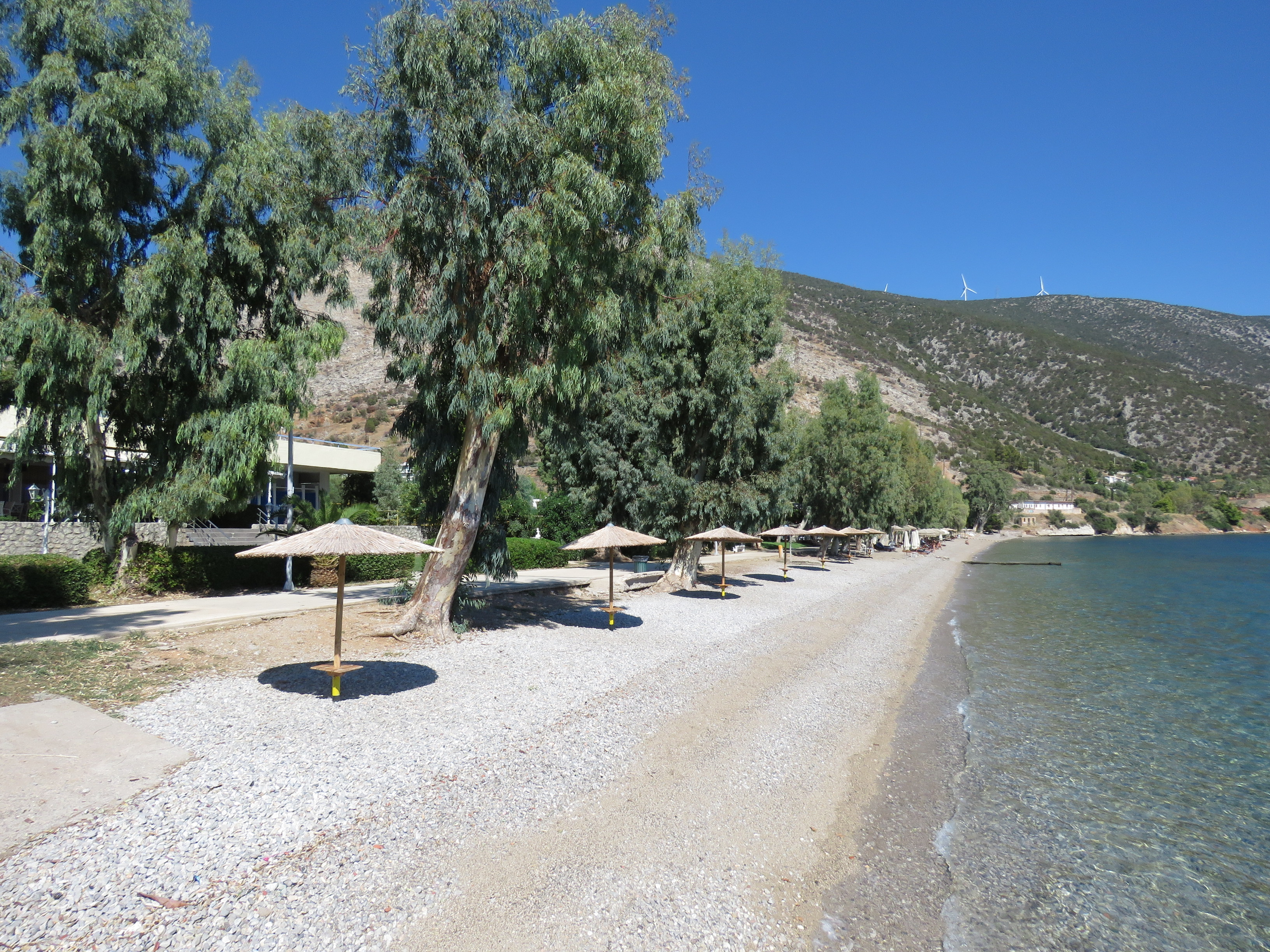
- Beach at Paralia Distomou in September 2022

- Location within Greece
- Coordinates: 38°23.3′N 22°39.2′E
- Country: Greece
- Administrative region: Central Greece
- Regional unit: Boeotia
- Municipality: Distomo-Arachova-Antikyra
- Municipal unit: Distomo
- Community: Distomo
- Elevation: 35 m (115 ft)

Population (2021)
  - Total: 1,676
- Time zone: UTC+2 (EET)
  - Summer (DST): UTC+3 (EEST)

Aspra Spitia (Greek: Άσπρα Σπίτια), is a town in the municipal unit Distomo-Arachova-Antikyra, in Boeotia, Greece. In 2021, its population was 1,676.

== History ==
Aspra Spitia was founded in 1960, planned by Doxiadis Associates to house industrial workers for Aluminum of Greece's nearby aluminum plant. Its alternate name is "Paralia Distomou". Aspra Spitia is situated on the north coast of the Corinthian Gulf, 2 km northeast of Antikyra, 10 km southwest of Distomo and 25 km west of Livadeia. The 2010 film Attenberg was shot in Aspra Spitia.

== Population ==
| Year | Population |
|---|---|
| 1991 | 2,156 |
| 2001 | 1,258 |
| 2011 | 1,578 |
| 2021 | 1,676 |

== Persons ==
- Konstantinos Apostolos Doxiadis
