= Greek National Road 29 =

Trunk road in Greece

National Road 29
- Εθνική Οδός 29
- Route of the EO29 road, in blue

Route information
- Length: 11.4 km (7.1 mi)
- Existed: 9 July 1963–present

Major junctions
- West end: Distomo (Steni)
- East end: Hosios Loukas

Location
- Country: Greece
- Regions: Central Greece
- Primary destinations: Distomo (Steni); Hosios Loukas

Highway system
- Highways in Greece; Motorways; National roads
← EO28	→ EO30

National Road 29 (Greek: Εθνική Οδός 29), abbreviated as the EO29, is a national road in Central Greece. The EO29 is a short road that connects the monastery of Hosios Loukas to the Greek national road network.

== Route ==
The EO29 is officially defined as a short road in the Boeotia regional unit, branching off the EO48 north of Distomo (Steni), and heading southeast towards the monastery of Hosios Loukas, passing through the village of Steiri.

== History ==
Ministerial Decision G25871 of 9 July 1963 created the EO29 from the old EO76, which existed by royal decree from 1955 until 1963, and followed the same route as the current EO29. Ministerial Decision DMEO/e/O/1308 of 15 December 1995 later subclassified the EO29 as part of the tertiary national network.
