= Anticyra (Locris) =

Town reported to exist in ancient Greece

Anticyra (Ancient Greek: Ἀντίκυρα) was a town reported to be Locris in ancient Greece, but now believed to be an error of ancient commentators. The existence of two ancient towns named Anticyra in central Greece is accepted by mainstream scholarship: Anticyra (in Phocis) and Anticyra in Thessaly.

William Smith, writing in the mid-19th century, reported that the supposed Anticyra in Locris was identified as the same as the one in Phocis by most modern scholars. Livy, however, expressly says that the Locrian Anticyra was situated on the left hand in entering the Corinthian Gulf, and at a short distance both by sea and land from Naupactus; whereas the Phocian Anticyra was nearer the extremity than the entrance of the Corinthian gulf, and was 60 miles (97 km) distant from Naupactus. Moreover Strabo speaks of three towns named Anticyra, one in Phocis, a second on the Maliac Gulf in Thessaly, and a third in the country of Ozolian Locris. Horace, likewise, in a well-known passage (Ars Poët. 300) speaks of three towns named Anticyra, and represents them all as producing hellebore.

This third Anticyra was long believed to have existed somewhere in Locris near Naupactus on the northwestern shore of the Corinthian Gulf. This has, however, been shown to have been a misunderstanding of Livy, who did not know the area well.
