= Medeon (disambiguation) =

Medeon is a municipal unit in Aetolia-Acarnania, Greece.

Medeon (Ancient Greek: Μεδεών) may also refer to:

- Medeon (Acarnania), a town of ancient Acarnania
- Medeon (Boeotia), a town of ancient Boeoetia
- Medeon (Phocis), a town of ancient Phocis
- Medun, a city of ancient Illyria
