= Anticyra (Thessaly) =

Ancient Greek city

Coordinates: 38°51′10″N 22°25′50″E

Map showing ancient Thessaly. Anticyra is shown to the centre bottom, south of Lamia.

Antikyra or Anticyra (Ancient Greek: Αντίκυρα, romanized: Antíkyra or Ἀντίκιρρα - Antíkirra or Ἀντίκυρρα - Antíkyrra or Ἀντίκυραι - Antíkyrae) was an ancient Greek city and polis (city-state) on the right bank of the Spercheios near its mouth on the Malian Gulf in district of Malis in Thessaly. To its south lay Mount Oeta. To distinguish it from the city of the same name in Phocis (now Boeotia), the Thessalian Antikyra was often distinguished as Malian Antikyra. Both were famed for their black and white hellebore, a prized herb in ancient Greek medicine.

The editors of the Barrington Atlas of the Greek and Roman World tentatively identify the site of Anticyra at the modern village of Kostalexis (Κωσταλέξης) in the municipality of Lamia.

== See also ==
- Phocian Antikyra, also the modern Antikyra
- Locrian Antikyra, a phantom city invented by Titus Livius
