= List of ports in Greece =

This is a list of ports and harbors in Greece.

== Maritime ports ==
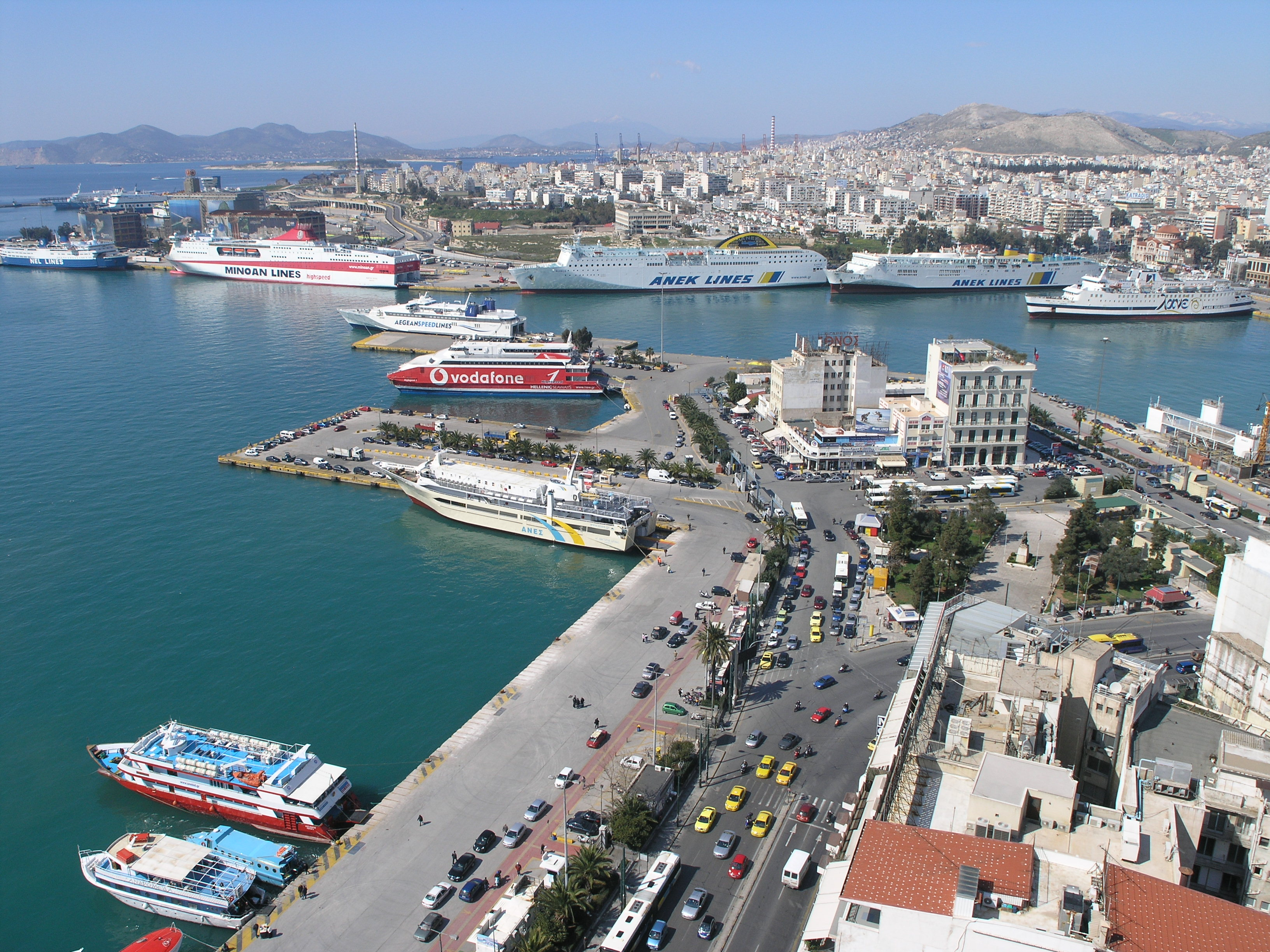
Port of Piraeus

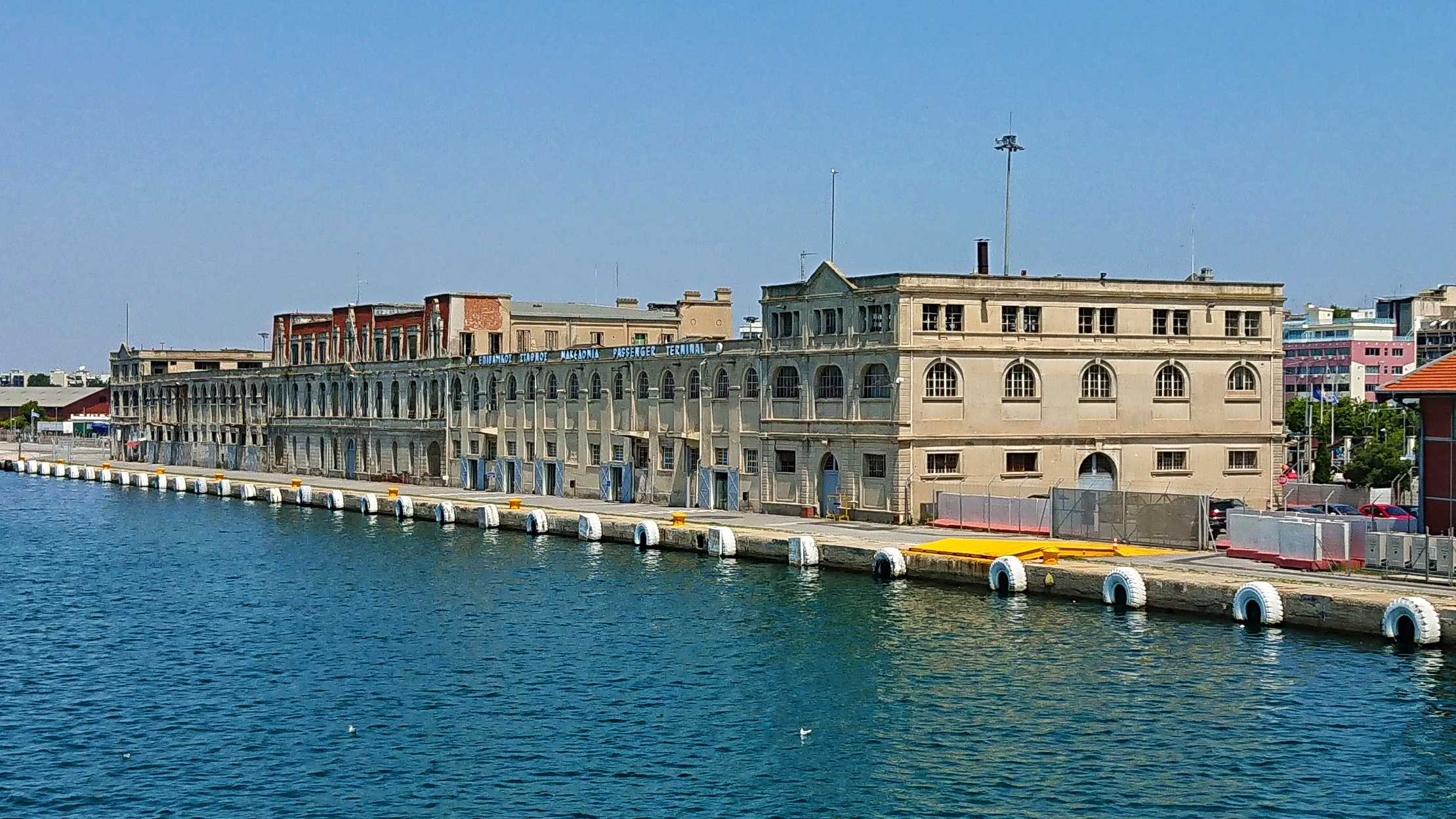
Port of Thessaloniki

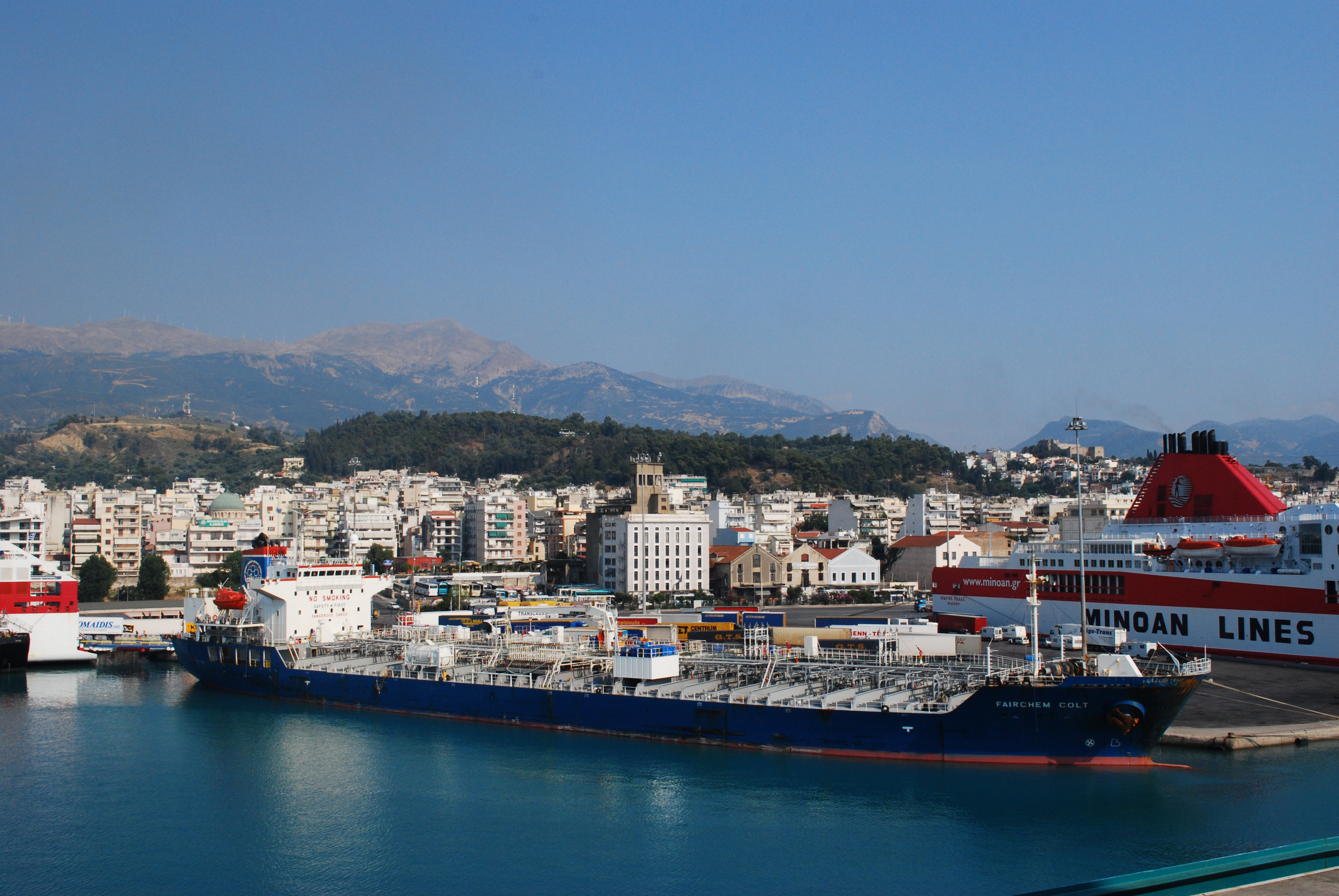
Port of Patras

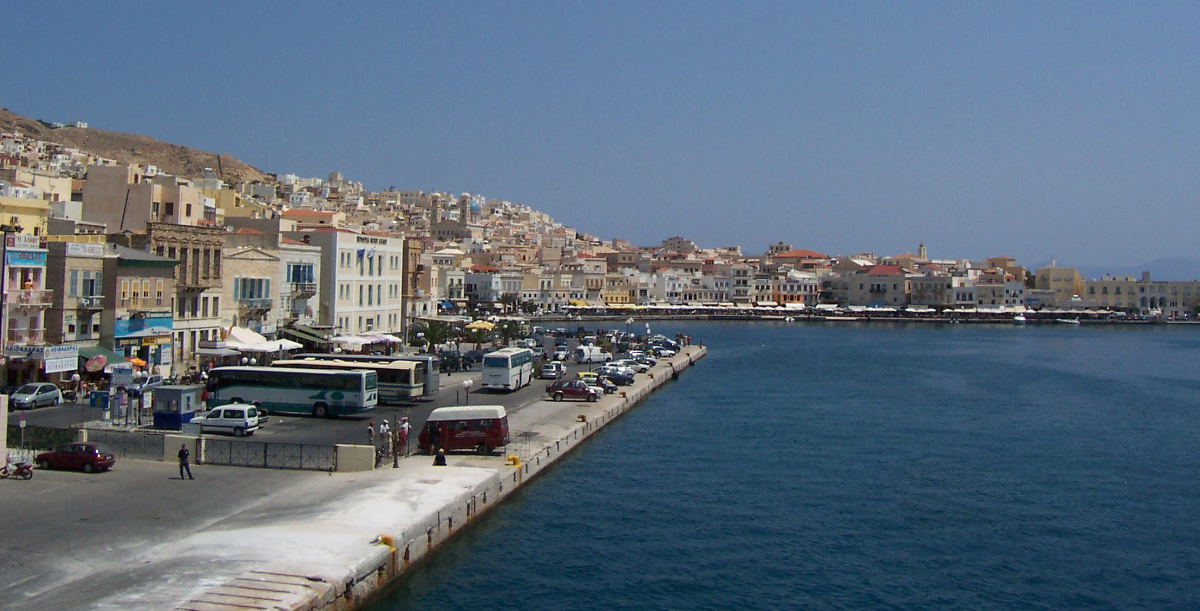
Port of Ermoupoli

The busiest maritime ports for passenger transport are:

- Aegina
- Antirrio
- Corfu
- Heraklion
- Igoumenitsa
- Keramoti
- Kyllini
- Mykonos
- Paloukia (Salamis)
- Paros
- Patras
- Perama
- Piraeus
- Rafina
- Rio
- Souda Bay (Crete)
- Thasos
- Thira (Santorini)
- Tinos
- Zakynthos

The busiest maritime ports for goods transport are:

- Agioi Theodoroi
- Aliveri (Euboea)
- Amaliapoli/Almyros
- Antikyra
- Antirrio
- Eleusis
- Heraklion
- Igoumenitsa
- Kavala
- Larymna
- Megara
- Milos
- Paloukia (Salamis)
- Patras
- Perama
- Piraeus
- Rio
- Thessaloniki
- Volos

== Gallery ==
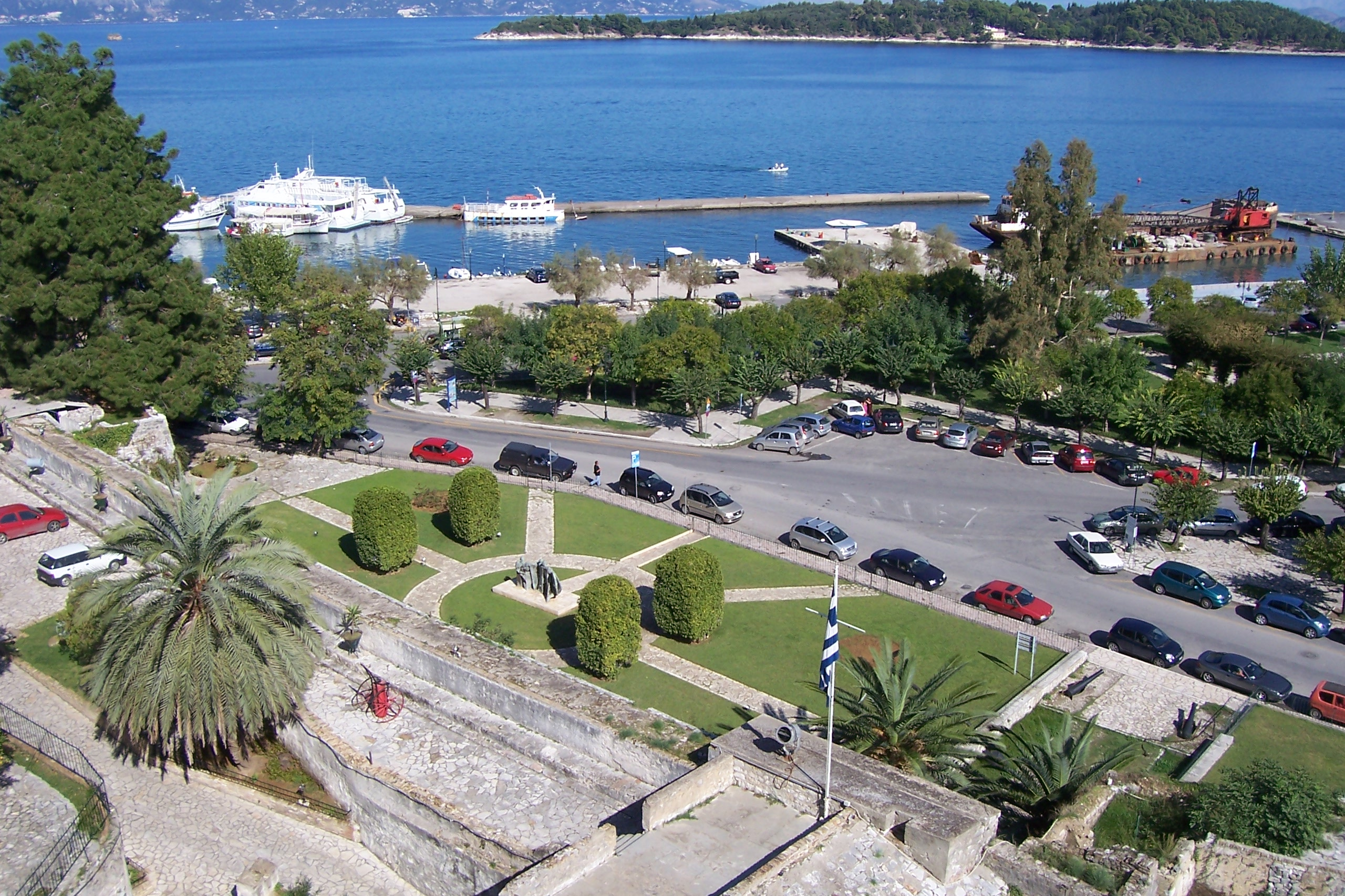
Port of Corfu

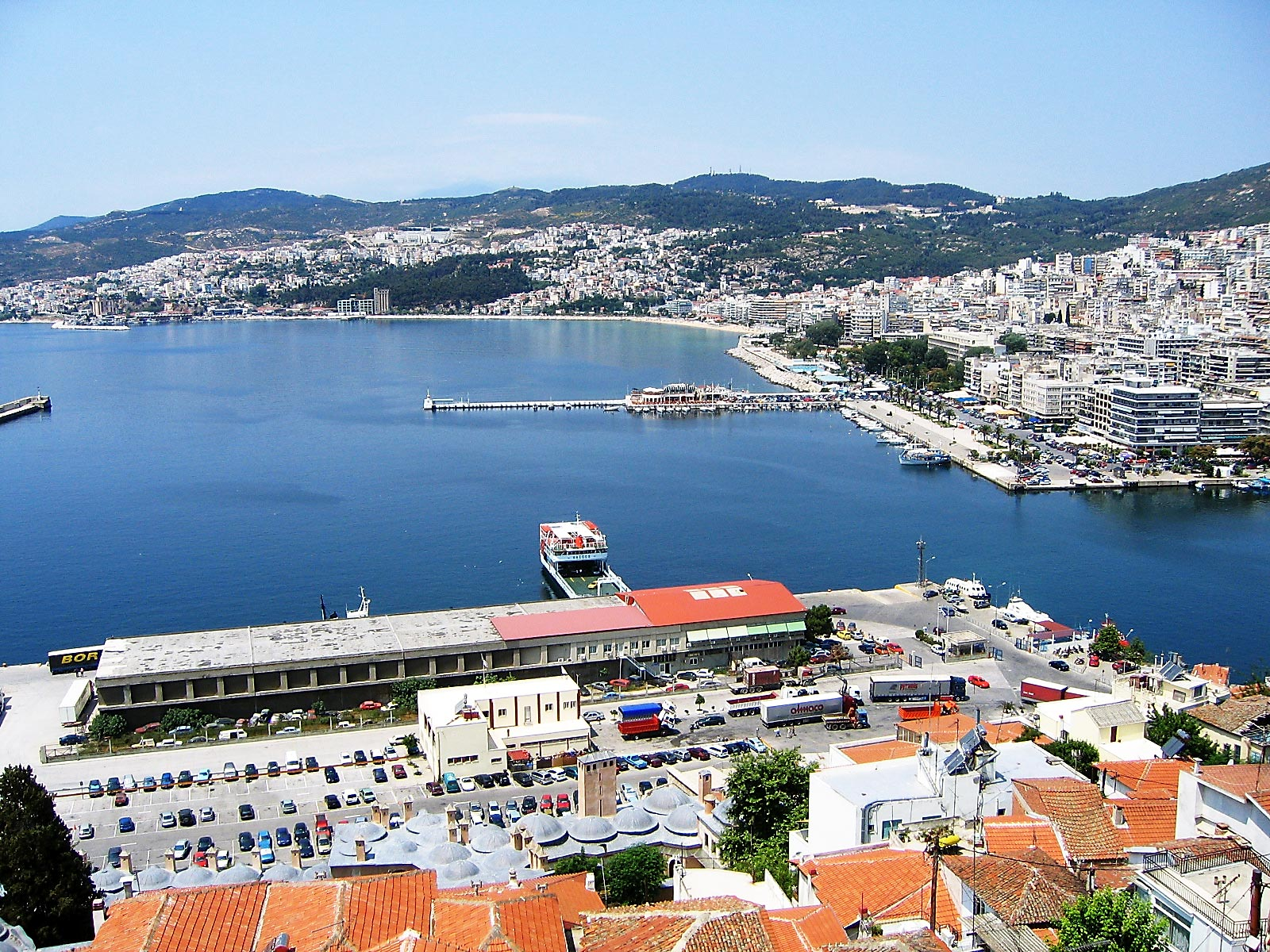
Port of Kavala

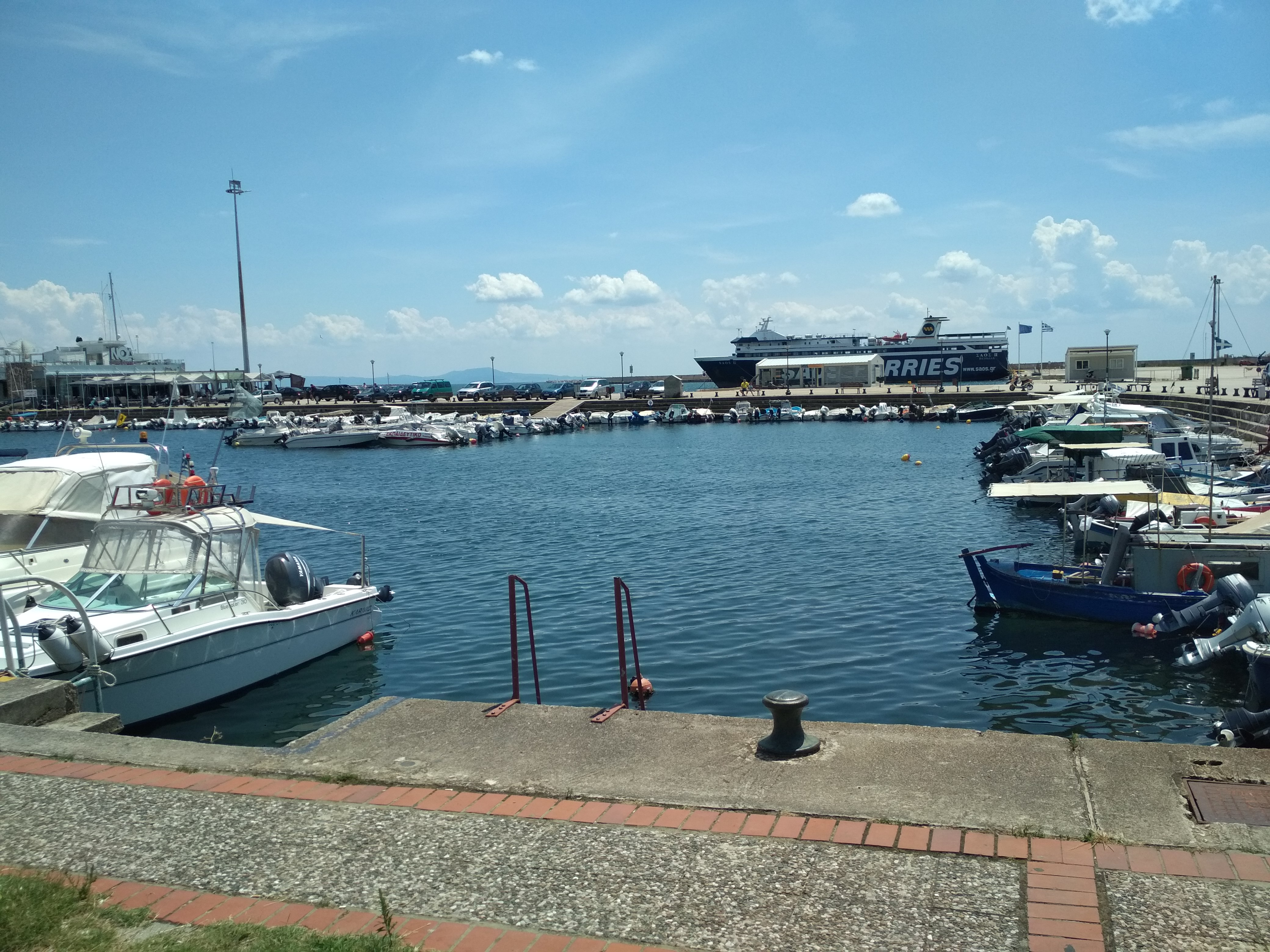
Port of Alexandroupoli

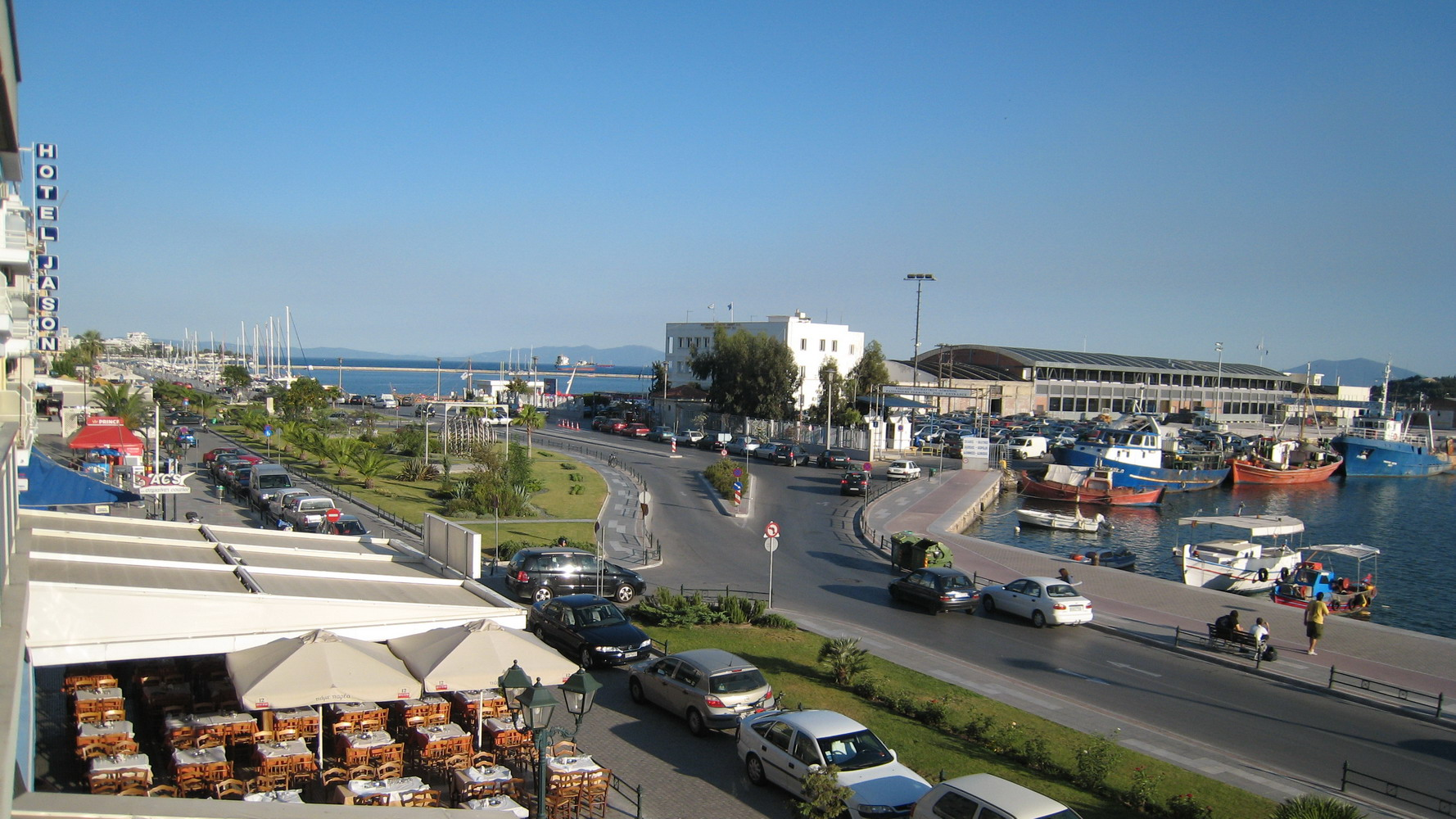
Port of Volos

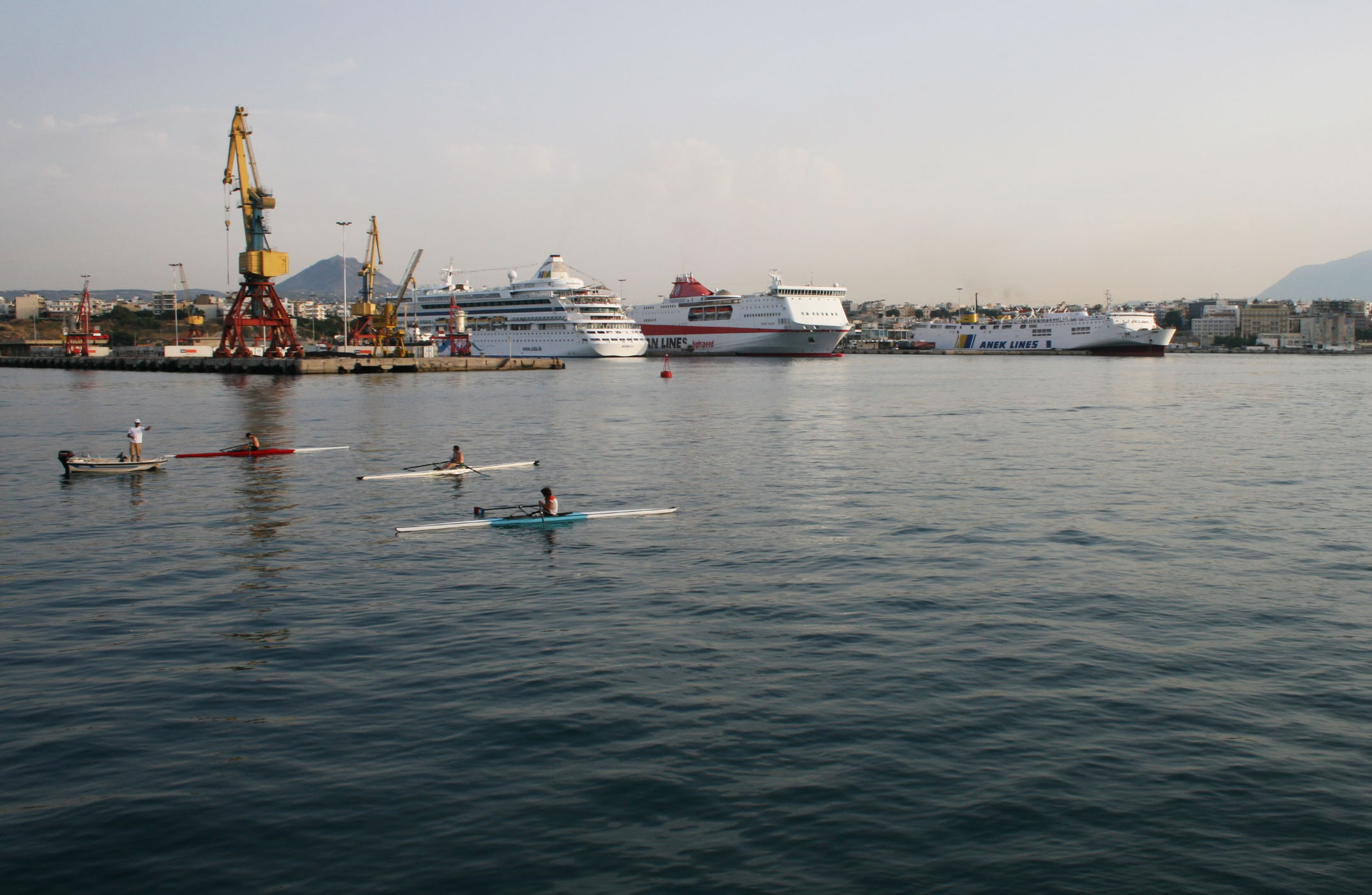
Port of Heraklion

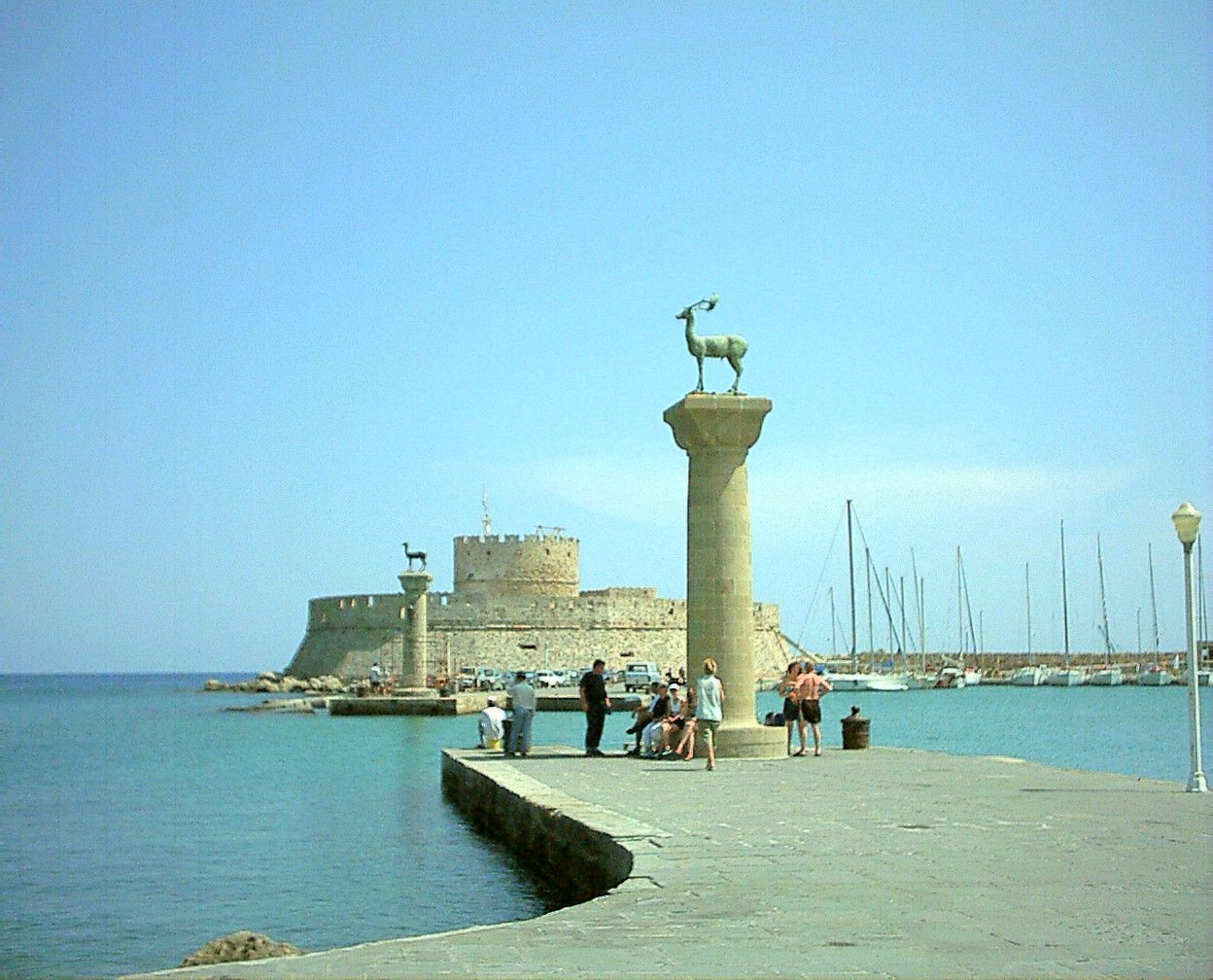
Port of Rhodes

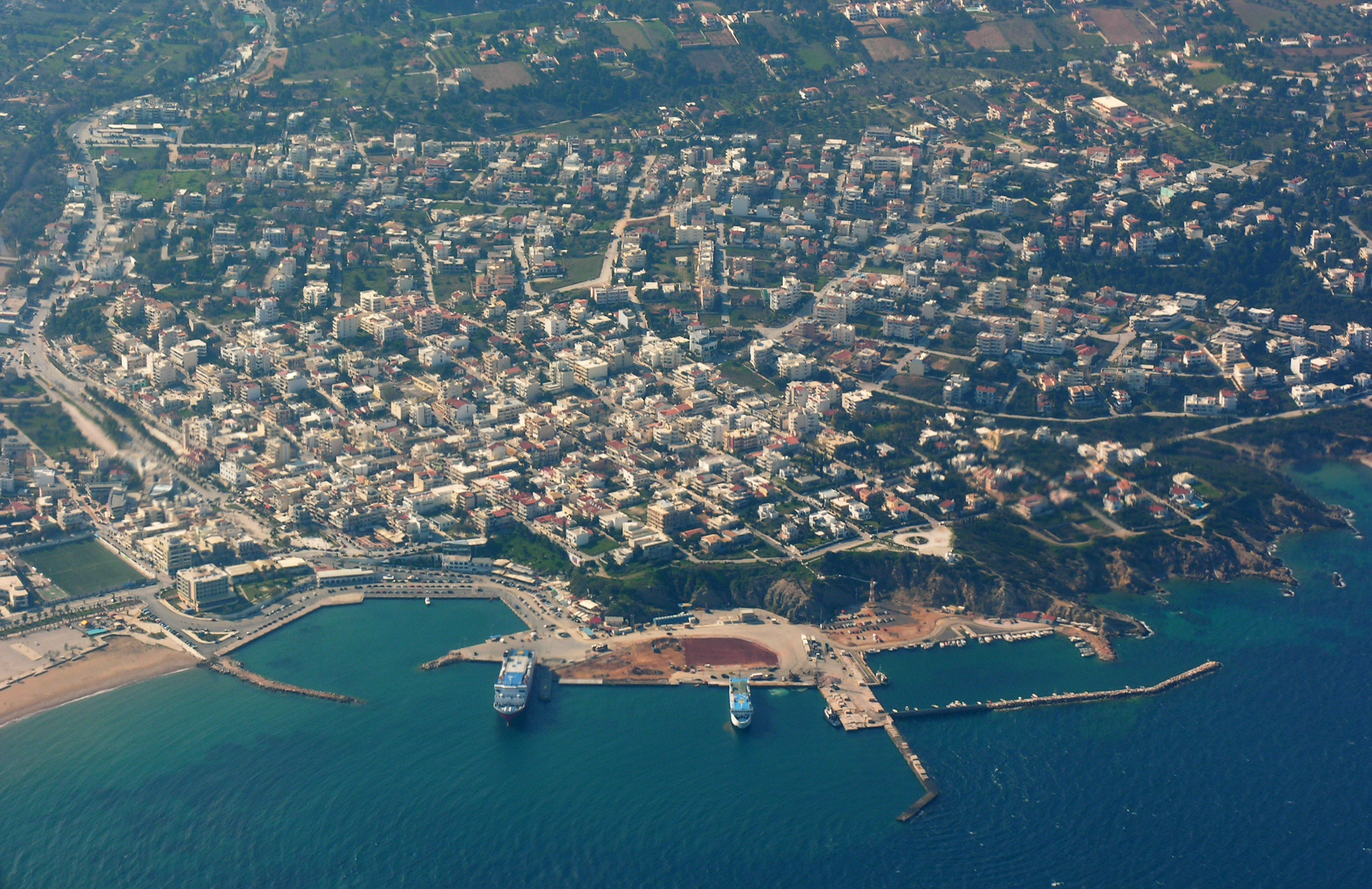
Port of Rafina

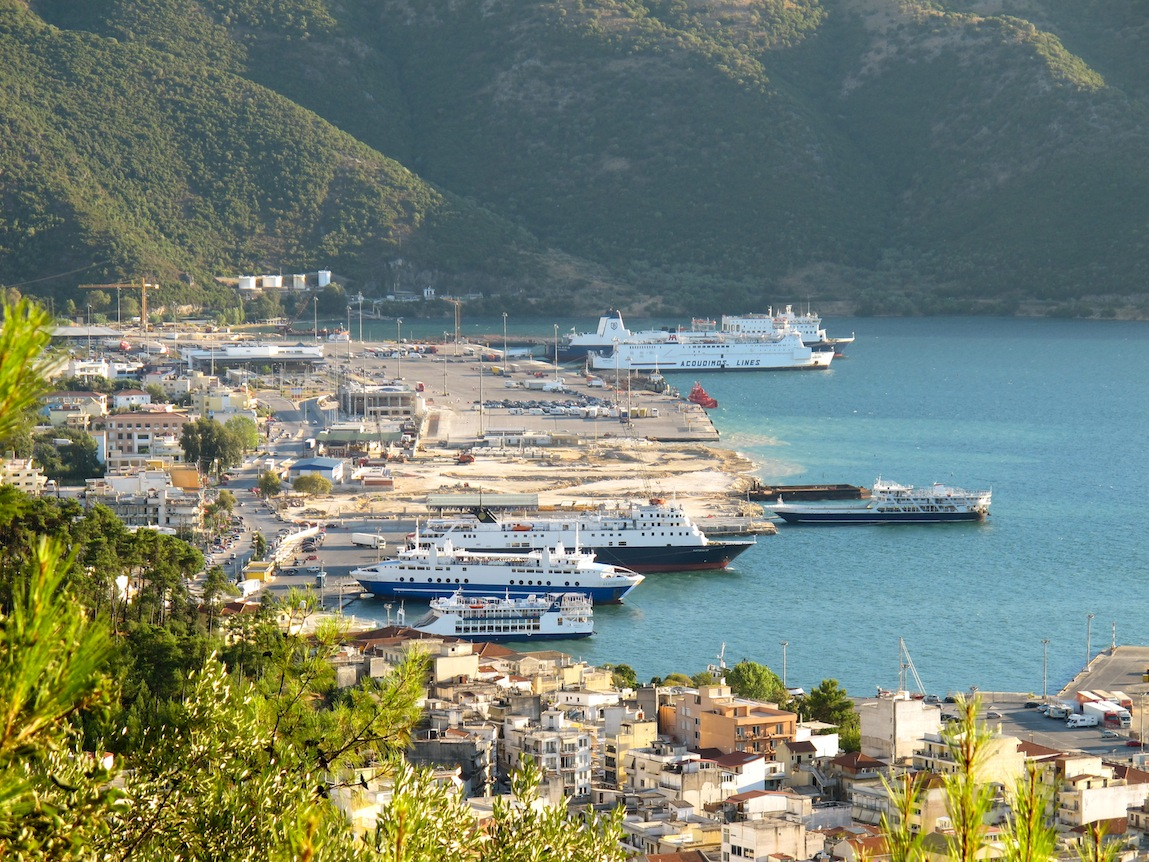
Port of Igoumenitsa

== See also ==
- Transport in Greece
- Greek shipping
