= Cyparissus (Phocis) =

Town of ancient Phocis

Cyparissus or Kyparissos (Ancient Greek: Κυπάρισσος) was a town of ancient Phocis, in the vicinity of Delphi. It is mentioned in the Homeric Catalogue of Ships in the Iliad along with Pytho (Delphi). It is described by Dicaearchus as situated in the interior of Phocis. It is placed by Strabo below Lycoreia, which was situated on one of the heights of Parnassus. Pausanias erroneously reports that Cyparissus was the ancient name of the place afterwards called Anticyra. Cyparissus is also mentioned by Statius and Stephanus of Byzantium.
