= Antikyra =

Antikyra Αντίκυρα
- Municipal unit
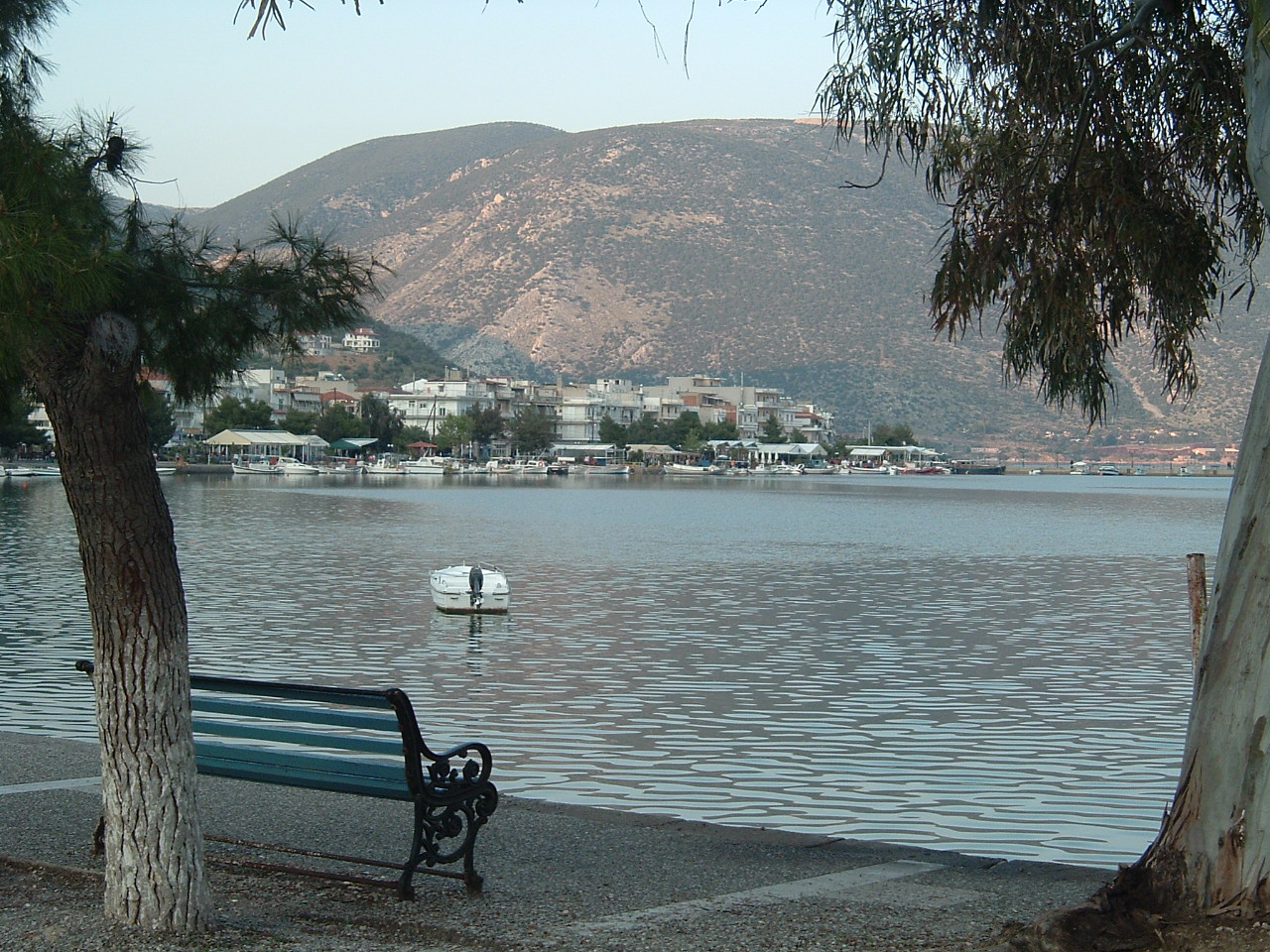

- Location within the regional unit

- Location within Greece
- Coordinates: 38°23′N 22°38′E
- Country: Greece
- Administrative region: Central Greece
- Regional unit: Boeotia
- Municipality: Distomo-Arachova-Antikyra

Area
  - Municipal unit: 23.4 km^{2} (9.0 sq mi)

Population (2021)
  - Municipal unit: 1,529
  - Municipal unit density: 65.3/km^{2} (169/sq mi)
- Time zone: UTC+2 (EET)
  - Summer (DST): UTC+3 (EEST)
- Vehicle registration: ΒΙ
- Website: www.antikyra.gr

Antikyra or Anticyra (Greek: Αντίκυρα) is a port on the west coast of the Gulf of Antikyra named after it. That gulf is a north-coast bay of the Gulf of Corinth. The settlement was made basically on a floor and beach fringing the northeast side of the mountainous Desfina Peninsula. Inscriptional evidence in the region proves that it has been continuous under the same name since classical Greece. Pausanias, an ancient writer, believed that at the beginning of the classical period it had two names, Antikyra and an earlier, Homeric name. Considering that the archaeology from that specific location dates only from the Geometric period, Pausanias' belief about the earlier antiquity of the site is suspect.

However, tombs from Medeon across the gulf date to the Middle Helladic (Middle Bronze Age) period, and the Desfina Peninsula as well as the Pleistos river valley were populated during the Mycenaean Period (Late Bronze Age). Although Antikyra does not appear in the Homeric Catalogue of Ships, which is almost a sine qua non for protohistoric Bronze Age antiquity, the southwest fringe of the Desfina Peninsula is known to have been the Mycenaean port area for settlements of the peninsula. It is considered likely by some that Pausanias' earlier settlement, under whatever name, was located there.

Be that as it may, Antikyra has had a long and continuous history since then, not even being abandoned after total destruction and transportation of all its population, whereas Medeon across the gulf did not even get through the Hellenistic Period. Besides export and import, Antikyra's Its main product has been black and white hellebore, which grow naturally in the area. The ancients used compounds extracted from them widely as purgatives to treat several diseases, but the side effects are severe and toxic, sometimes inducing psychosis. In one historical incident it appears to have been weaponized as a poison. Antikyra's use of their own product gave them a certain reputation among the ancients as wild men. Currently the communities of the gulf have adopted the metals business, notably aluminum, after a plant was constructed beneath Medeon across the gulf.

Antikyra was destroyed and rebuilt during the 4th- and 3rd-century BC wars of Macedonia and Rome and following a 7th-century AD earthquake. During the 14th century, it was held by Catalan mercenaries. Politically it was a primary port of ancient Phocis. in modern times it became a municipality of Boeotia, along with Distomo and Arachova. During the Kallikrates reform of 2011, which sought to decrease governmental substructure by combining municipalities, it was made a unit of the new unified municipality of Distomo-Arachova-Antikyra.

== Etymologies of the identifying names ==
Antikyra has been (erroneously) identified with the Cyparissus (Ancient Greek: Κυπάρισσος, romanized: Kyparissos, lit. "Cypress") which appears in the Homeric Catalogue of Ships as the primary port of ancient Phocis. It became known as Antikirrha or Anticirrha (Ἀντίκιρρα) from its position on the opposite side of a peninsula from Cirrha, Delphi's port on the Gulf of Corinth. This name then became Antikyrrha or Anticyrrha (Ἀντίκυρρα) and then Antikyra. The last was followed by the Romans, Latinized as Anticyra. During its period under the Catalans, it was known as Port de Arago. Under the Ottomans, it became known as Aspra Spitia (Greek: Άσπρα Σπίτια) for its white houses but its former name was restored in the early 20th century. Under the former BGN/PCGN standard, it was romanized as Andikira in America and the United Kingdom until 1996.

== Demography of the unit and of the village ==
It is necessary for understanding of the demography to distinguish between the new municipal unit and the village itself of Antikyra. The Antikyra unit includes the Kephali Peninsula to the south and a strip of the southwest coast of the gulf. To the north the unit does not infringe on the traditional Paralia Distomou ("Distomo Beach"), but it does include a large portion of mountainous terrain to the west of the Distomo-Antikyra Road and the valley it follows.

Antikyra's municipal unit has an area of 23.4 square kilometres (9.0 sq mi). Its population in 2015 was 1,346, with a median age of 43.5 years (not favoring either old or young). Males outnumbered females slightly, not enough to indicate any sort of trend. The population was unremarkable, probably no different from any random population of Greece. Historically, after experiencing an influx 1975-2000, the population declined slightly 2000-2015. In 2015 the population density was a sparse 57.5 persons per square km, but the inclusion of uninhabited and uninhabitable terrain must lower the density from a maximum in the village itself.

The traditional village of Antikyra is located only on the NW coastal shelf of the gulf, not including the Kephali Peninsula or any of the mountainous terrain. It appears as a pleasant and prosperous maritime community on the beach. Certainly no vessels other than small boats can anchor there, of which there are a multitude. There is a deep-water harbor on the southern angle of the Kephali Peninsula, and deep water across the gulf under the site of Medeon, near which modern docks have been constructed.

The village offers an area of about 0.354 square kilometres (0.137 sq mi). The population in 2015 was 699, giving a higher density than the unit of 1975 persons per square km. This is probably close to the maximum such a small area can support. The settlement therefore is more of a rural coastal village placed on the beach out of the way of the main town at Paralia Distomou. There is an archaeological answer as to why a classical population should prefer it, as is explained in a previous section. It is closer to the ancient port at Steno on the south side of the Kephali Peminsula. Until the construction of the aluminum factory, modern roads and tunnels through Boeotia had diminished the value the ancient Gulf of Antkyra had as a port.

Modern population numbers are high compared to the past. Before about 1810 the population was consistently less than 200. The small number of villagers participating in its history is not revealed by the mere historical facts; however, often small bands are significant far beyond their numbers. After 1810 a slow expansion began, accelerating to a peak in 2000. After that the population declined and is expected to continue to decline; however, the numbers cannot predict possible future events.

== Geography of the maritime region ==
Antikyra is situated on the Bay of Antikyra (Latin: Anticyranus Sinus) on the north coast of the Gulf of Corinth. It lies 2 or 3 kilometers (1.2 or 1.9 mi) southwest of Paralia Distomou (also formerly known as "Aspra Spitia") and 10 kilometers (6.2 mi) southeast of Desfina. It is separated from Delphi by Mount Cirphis and from the Crissaean Gulf by the Opus peninsula (Latin: Opus Promontorium). The municipal unit also contains the villages of Agia Sotira and Agios Isidoros. Antikyra lies approximately 170 km from Athens. Antykyra consists of restaurants, fishing, and a beach popular with local residents called Agios Isidoros.

== History, prehistory, mythology ==
=== Ancient ===
Historically, Antikyra was an important town. In antiquity, it was associated with the still-older settlement of Kyparissos which was noted as the primary port of Mycenaean Phocis in Homer's Iliad. The name literally means "cypress" but was glossed as deriving from the town's mythical founder Cyparissus, son of Orchomenus and brother of Minyas. The Catalogue of Ships states the Phocians who joined the Trojan War sailed from Kyparissos to join the main fleet at Aulis before it sailed for Troy. The reputed graves of the heroes Schedios and Epistrophos, the Phocian admirals, were maintained through Roman times.

The name Antikyra was said to have derived from an "Antikyreos" or "Anticyreus" who cured Hercules's insanity with local hellebore. Black and white hellebore were the main reason for the town's fame in the ancient world. Both grew nearby and were regarded by Greek medicine as cures for forms of insanity, melancholy, gout, and epilepsy. The circumstance gave rise to a number of Greek and Latin expressions, like Αντικυρας σε δει or "naviget Anticyram," and to frequent allusions in Greek and Roman literature. Pausanias claims that black hellebore was used as a laxative, whilst white hellebore was used as an emetic.

Antikyra was destroyed in 346 BC by Philip II of Macedon amid the Third Sacred War. It recovered enough to quickly begin construction of a temple to Artemis with a cult statue commissioned to Praxiteles by 330 BC. Antikyra was then besieged, destroyed, and rebuilt several times during the Roman Republic's Macedonian Wars. In 198 BC, it was sacked by Titus Quinctius Flamininus, who choose it as winter base for his army.

During the 2nd century BC, Antikyra struck autonomous bronze coins with the head of Poseidon on the obverse and Artemis bearing a torch and an arch on the reverse.

Pausanias visited the city during the third quarter of the 2nd century and gave a detailed account of it in his Description of Greece. He notes the grave of Schedios and Epistrophos, a temple to Poseidon with a bronze statue of the god standing with one foot resting on a dolphin, a hand upon this thigh and a trident in his other hand, two gymnasia (one including a statue of Xenodamos, who won the pangration at the Olympics in AD 67 owing to the participation of the emperor Nero), an agora with many bronze statues, a sheltered well, and two temples of Artemis outside the town walls. One was dedicated to Artemis Diktynna; the other held Praxiteles's sculpture and, according to a newly discovered inscription, was dedicated to Artemis Eileithyia.

=== Medieval ===
Under the Byzantines, the city served as a bishopric. (A large 5-nave basilica with a mosaic floor was unearthed in the 1980s.) A large earthquake destroyed most of the city around AD 620. During the 14th century, the city was named Port de Arago while its fortress was held by the Catalans, probably under the aegis of the county of Salona (mod. Amphissa). It became known as Aspra Spitia or Asprospitia under the Turks.

=== Modern ===
Aspra Spitia's connection with the ancient Antikyra was established by William Martin Leake in 1806 when he found an inscription mentioning its name. The area was subsequently excavated by Lolling, Dittenberger, Fossey, the 10th Archaeological Ephorate, and the 1st Byzantine Ephorate. During this period, an archaic temple of Athena was discovered, along with its severe style bronze statuette, a large part of the 4th-century BC ashlar fortification with 2 rectangular towers, and an early Christian bath with a hypocaust.

In 1836, after Greek independence, the municipality Antikyraia was established, containing the villages Desfina (the seat of the municipality), Aspra Spitia and Moni Agiou Ioannou Prodromou. In 1912, the municipality was replaced by the new community Desfina. Antikyra became a separate community in 1929, but was merged back into Desfina in 1935. The community Antikyra was re-established in 1943. In the 1950s and '60s, Aluminum of Greece developed the country's largest aluminum plant to exploit nearby bauxite deposits. A new town was developed for its workers under the name Aspra Spitia; this is now known as Paralia Distomou. Greenpeace has complained of the effects of the red mud dumped into the bay from the plant. At the 2010 Kallikratis reform, Antikyra was merged with its neighbors to form Distomo-Arachova-Antikyra.

== See also ==
- List of settlements in Boeotia
