= Steiri =

Steiri Στείρι
- Community
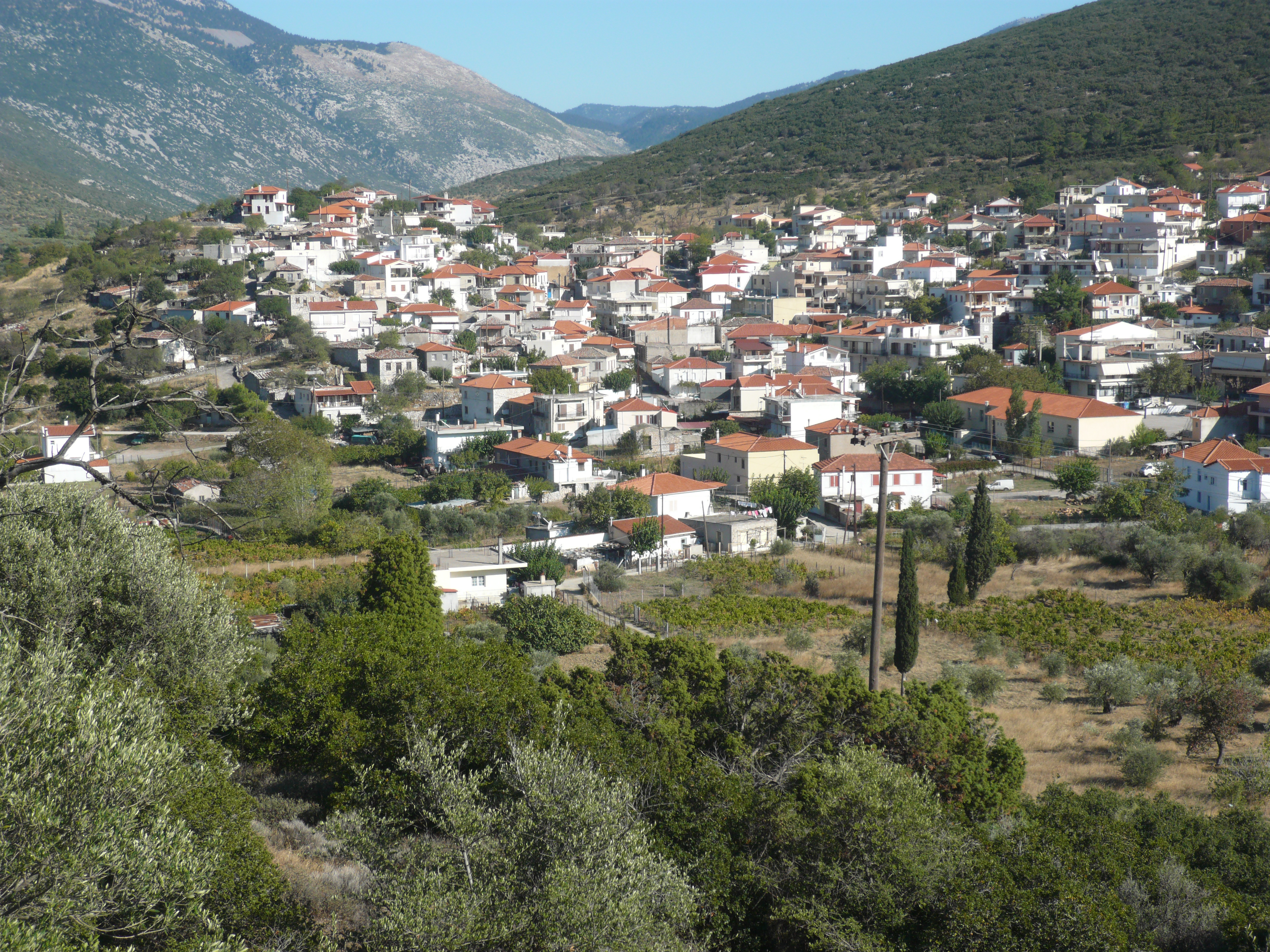
- Steiri

- Location within Greece
- Coordinates: 38°24′N 22°42′E
- Country: Greece
- Administrative region: Central Greece
- Regional unit: Boeotia
- Municipality: Distomo-Arachova-Antikyra
- Municipal unit: Distomo
- Highest elevation: 1,000 m (3,300 ft)
- Lowest elevation: 440 m (1,440 ft)

Population (2021)
  - Community: 559
- Time zone: UTC+2 (EET)
  - Summer (DST): UTC+3 (EEST)
- Postal code: 321 00
- Area code: 26940
- Vehicle registration: BI

Steiri (Greek: Στείρι) is a village in Boeotia, Greece. It is situated at the western end of Mount Helicon, the mythical mountain of the Muses, at 450 m elevation. The 10th century Hosios Loukas monastery, a World Heritage Site, is situated near Steiri. Steiri is 4 km southeast of Distomo and 15 km west of Livadeia. The Greek National Road 29 (Itea - Desfina - Distomo - Hosios Loukas) passes through the village.

== Population ==
Year	Population
1981	942
1991	914
2001	1,010
2011	686
2021	559

== People ==
- Nicholas the Pilgrim, Christian saint and hermit, was born here around 1075/1076
