= Neon (Phocis) =

Town of ancient Greece

Neon (Ancient Greek: Νεών) was a town of ancient Phocis, said to have been built after the Trojan War, that was situated at the foot of Mount Tithorea, one of the peaks of Mount Parnassus.

Herodotus relates that, during the Greco-Persian Wars, when the Persian army under Xerxes I invaded Phocis, many of the Phocians took refuge in Tithorea near Neon, and that the latter city was destroyed by the Persians (480 BC). It was, however, afterwards rebuilt; but was again destroyed, with the other Phocian towns, at the end of the Sacred War. In its neighbourhood, Philomelus, the Phocian general, was defeated, and perished in the flight by throwing himself down from a lofty rock. Neon now disappears from history, and in its place we read of a town Tithorea, which is described by Pausanias. This writer regards Tithorea as situated on the same site as Neon; and relates that Tithorea was the name anciently applied to the whole district, and that when the inhabitants of the neighbouring villages were collected in the city, the name of Tithorea was substituted for that of Neon. This, however, is not in accordance with the statement of Plutarch, according to whom Tithorea, in the time of the Mithridatic War, was a fortress surrounded by precipitous rocks, where the Phocians took refuge from Xerxes. He further states that it was not such a city as the one existing in his day. If the view of Plutarch is correct, that the fortress, the site of which was afterwards occupied by the city Tithorea, was the place where the Phocians took refuge from Xerxes, we may conclude that Tithorea and Neon were two different places.

Some modern writers have followed Pausanias in identifying Tithorea and Neon; but Heinrich Ulrichs, for the reasons which have been already stated, supposes them to have been different cities, and places Neon at the Hellenic ruins on the Cephissus, called Paleá Fiva, distant 3.5 miles (5.6 km) from modern Tithorea (formerly Velitsa, since renamed to reflect the association with the ancient town).
