= Desfina =

Town in Phocis, Greece

Desfina Δεσφίνα
- Municipal unit
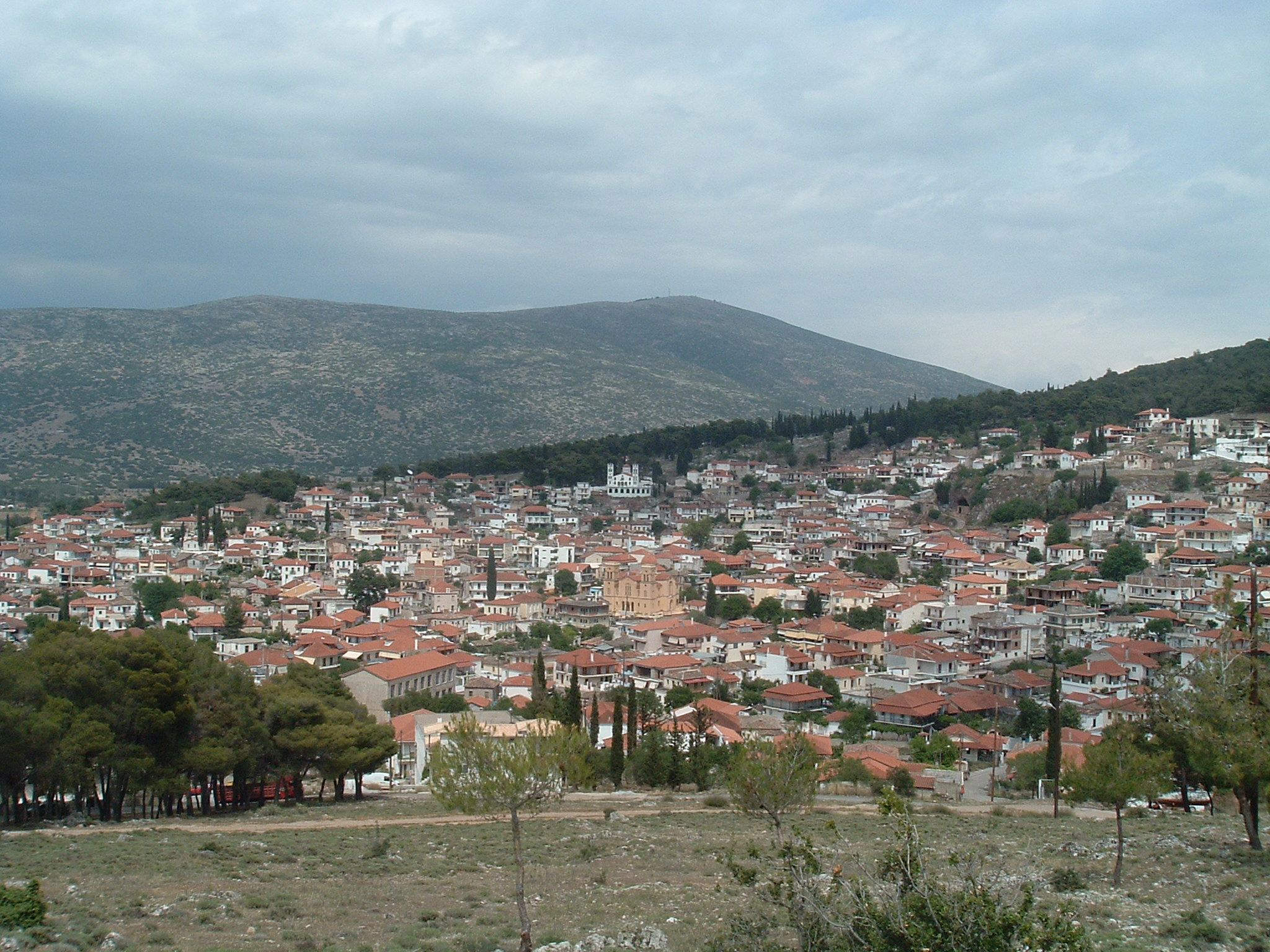
- Desfina

- Location within the regional unit

- Location within Greece
- Coordinates: 38°25′N 22°32′E
- Country: Greece
- Administrative region: Central Greece
- Regional unit: Phocis
- Municipality: Delphi

Area
  - Municipal unit: 148.99 km^{2} (57.53 sq mi)
- Elevation: 680 m (2,230 ft)

Population (2021)
  - Municipal unit: 1,748
  - Municipal unit density: 11.73/km^{2} (30.39/sq mi)
- Time zone: UTC+2 (EET)
  - Summer (DST): UTC+3 (EEST)
- Postal code: 330 50
- Area code: 22650
- Vehicle registration: ΑΜ
- Website: www.desfina.gr

Desfina (Greek: Δεσφίνα) is a town and a former municipality in the southern part of Phocis, Greece. Since the 2011 local government reform it is part of the municipality Delphi, of which it is a municipal unit. The municipal unit has an area of 148.992 km^{2}. It is situated on a plateau at 680m elevation, 5 km from the Corinthian Gulf. It is 7 km southeast of Delphi, 9 km east of Itea and 30 km west of Livadeia.

== History ==
Ruins near Desfina have been identified as those of the ancient towns Echedameia (Ancient Greek: Ἐχεδάμεια) and Medeon (Μεδεών). Both towns were destroyed by King Philip II of Macedon around 355-346 BC during the Third Sacred War and were never rebuilt. 4 km to the east, the Late Mycenaean ruins of Kastrouli have been equated with Homeric Anemoreia (Ἀνεμώρεια).

One of the most important rebels of the Greek revolution, Bishop Isaias of Salona, fought for the liberation of Desfina until his execution by the Turks on 22 April 1821 and encouraged Athanasios Diakos for the battle of Alamana. Also, Isaias gave the signal for the beginning of revolution of Central Greece at the region of Prophet Daniel. His residence is found in Desfina and has been converted to a museum. In Desfina there is the Monastery of Honest Precursor which was distinguished at the revolution on 1821 as well as the very important Byzantine monument, the temple of Brigadiers near to the church of Saint Haralampos that dates to the 12th century.

== Economy ==
A large employer in the area of Desfina is Aluminium of Greece, which has a production facility at nearby Distomo, and many citizens in the area work a job at this factory, ranging from production, to office work. Before, the locals were mainly sustained by animal breeding. The most important traditional products in the region are bakery products, olives and oil, grapes and wine, meat, cheese products and honey.

== Climate ==
Climate data for Desfina
Month	Jan	Feb	Mar	Apr	May	Jun	Jul	Aug	Sep	Oct	Nov	Dec	Year
Mean daily maximum °C (°F)	11 (52)	11.2 (52.2)	14.12 (57.42)	19.50 (67.10)	24.92 (76.86)	28.03 (82.45)	29.34 (84.81)	29.40 (84.92)	24.12 (75.42)	19.85 (67.73)	14.67 (58.41)	11.82 (53.28)	19.83 (67.72)
Mean daily minimum °C (°F)	4.7 (40.5)	4.32 (39.78)	5.29 (41.52)	10.77 (51.39)	13.96 (57.13)	16.71 (62.08)	18.11 (64.60)	19.29 (66.72)	19.23 (66.61)	12.80 (55.04)	9.03 (48.25)	5.39 (41.70)	11.63 (52.94)
Average rainy days	8.3	7.8	7.7	6.9	5.0	1.6	0.9	1.3	2.5	5.2	8.1	9.6	64.9

== Customs, traditions and feasts ==
The Christmas and the Easter are celebrated with particular way mainly in villages and small town. Desfina is a town where the customs, the traditions and the feasts are still kept to a large extent. The most important festivities take place in August. The most important event is the feast of the Dormition of the Virgin Mary, which is celebrated on 15 August.

== Landmarks ==
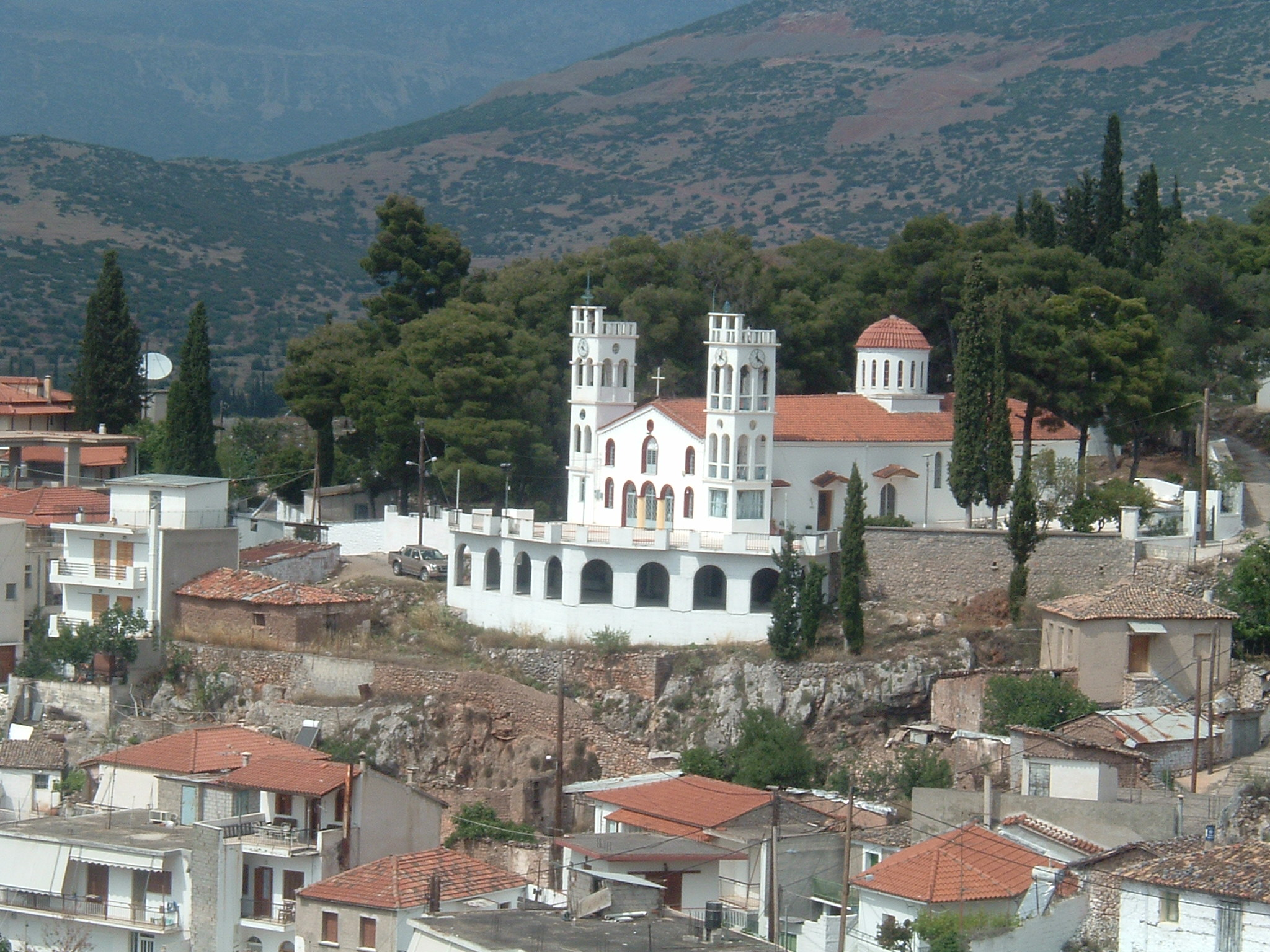
View of the church of Agios Charalambos.

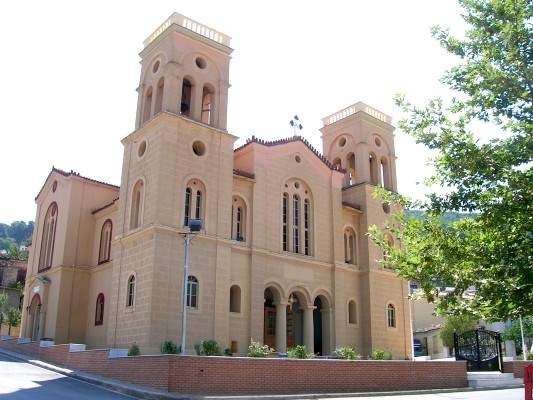
The church of Koimisi tis Theotokou.

There are several historical monuments and temples in Desfina as well as the central square which dates back to the 19th century. The square of Desfina is encircled by traditional cafes and taverns which offer a view of Mount Parnassos.

- New Abbey of Honest Precursor
- Old Abbey of Honest Precursor
- Temple of the Taxiarches
- Temple of Brigadiers Metropolitan Temple of Virgin Mary
- Temple of Saint Charalampos
- Temple of Saint Dimitrios
- Temple of the Holy Unmercenaries
- Residence of Bishop Isaias
- Residence of Spyros Papaloukas

== Population ==
Historical population
Year	Pop.	±%
2001	2,115	—
2011	1,988	−6.0%
2021	1,748	−12.1%

== Events and organizations ==
The Cultural Association of Desfina I Proodos ("The Progress") was founded on 6 July 1979 and today numbers 200 members. The aim of the cultural association is the intellectual growth and moral culture, the promotion of spirit of culture and humanitarian bond between the members as well as contribution in the configuration of environment. The choir of Desfina, founded in 1999, consists of an adult's and a children's section. Every summer they host a traditional concert for Greek Clarino, which people from around the region attend almost every year. Another event that the city holds is on August 15th, Mary, the mother of Jesus's Name Day, where they host a traditional dance in the town center, during the Dormition Of The Virgin Mary.

There are two football clubs in Desfina: Isaias Desfina, founded in 1973, and Doxa Desfina, founded in 1986.

== Settlements ==
The municipal unit of Desfina consists of the following settlements:

- Agios Andreas
- Agios Nikolaos
- Desfina
- Genimakia
- Makria Mallia
- Potamoi
- Prosakos
- Stenos
- Sykia
- Timios Prodromos Monastery
- Valtos

== Notable people ==
- Isaias of Salona, bishop and freedom fighter
- Spyros Papaloukas, painter
- Fathers of Lucas Papademos, economist and Prime Minister of Greece from 2011 to 2012
- Giorgos Ch. Theocharis, novelist, poet and writer

== Mayors of Desfina ==
Period	Majors
1987–1990	Efstathios G. Mantzoros
1991–1994	Efstathios G. Mantzoros
1995–1998	Achilleas I. Makris
1999–2002	Efstathios G. Mantzoros
2003–2006	Panagiota A. Kampafli
2007–2010	Efstathios G. Mantzoros
