= Tithorea (Phocis) =

City in ancient Phocis

Coordinates: 38°35′00″N 22°40′10″E

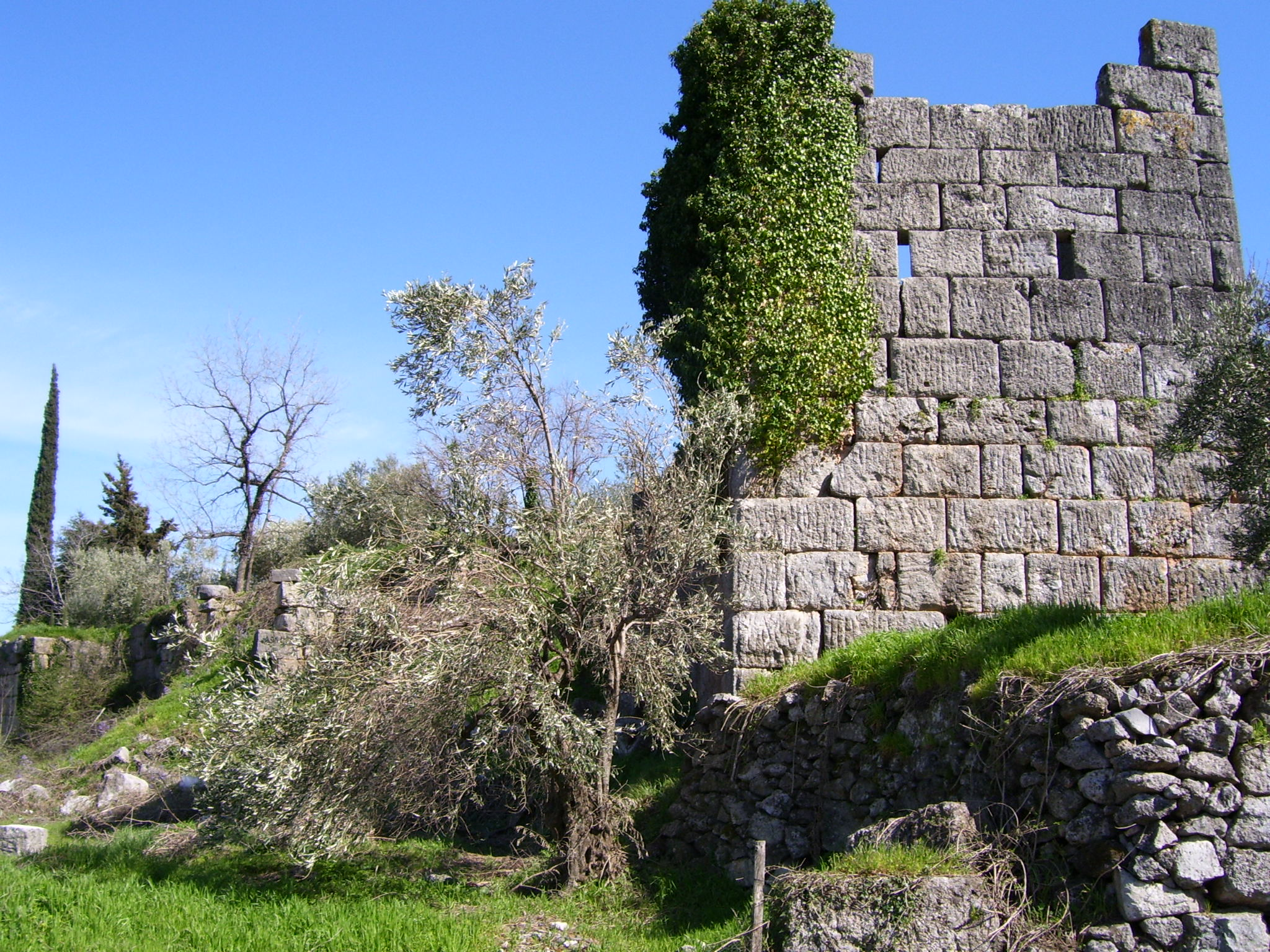
Remains of the walls at ancient Tithorea

Tithorea (Ancient Greek: Τιθορέα, Τιθοραία, Τιθόρα, or Τιθόρρα) was a city in ancient Phocis, the successor settlement to Neon. Whether Tithorea occupied the same, or a nearby spot, to Neon is a matter of some doubt. Pausanias regards Tithorea as situated on the same site as Neon; and relates that Tithorea was the name anciently applied to the whole district, and that when the inhabitants of the neighbouring villages were collected in the city, the name of Tithorea was substituted for that of Neon.

== History ==
In accordance with the statement of Plutarch, the Tithorea in the time of the Mithridatic War, was a fortress surrounded by precipitous rocks, where the Phocians took refuge from Xerxes I. He further states that it was not such a city as the one existing in his day. If the view of Plutarch is correct, that the fortress, the site of which was afterwards occupied by the city Tithorea, was the place where the Phocians took refuge from Xerxes, we may conclude that Tithorea and Neon were two different places.

The city, which existed in the time of Plutarch and Pausanias, was a place of some importance, though it had begun to decline for a generation before the time of Pausanias. The latter writer mentions, however, a theatre, the enclosure of an ancient agora, a temple of Athena, and the tomb of Antiope and Phocus. A river flowed by Tithorea, called Cachales (Καχάλης), to which the inhabitants had to descend in order to obtain water. The city also produced a remarkable quality of olive oil that whilst smaller in quantity than that of Attica or Syconia was considered to be superior in quality to that of the Iberian Peninsula and that of Istria.

It was also told that, when the sun passed through Taurus, the inhabitants of Tithorea took earth from the supposed tomb where Amphion and Zethus were buried, which was in Thebes; if this earth was put in contact with the tomb of Antiope, the people of Tithorea would have good harvest and the Thebans bad, for that reason the Thebans had put sentinels in the tomb.

The ruins of Tithorea are situated at the modern village of the same name (formerly called Velitsa but renamed to reflect the association with the ancient city), at the northeast foot of Mount Parnassus. The site is fixed by an inscription found there, in which the name of Tithorea occurs. A considerable portion of the walls, and many of the towers, still remain. The town was carefully fortified towards the west and northwest, and was sufficiently protected towards the northeast and east by the precipitous banks of the Cachales, and towards the south by the steep sides of Mt. Parnassus. The walls are almost 9 feet (2.7 m) broad. The Cachales, which now bears the name of Kakóreuma, or the evil torrent, flows in a ravine below the village, and thus illustrates the statement of Pausanias, that the inhabitants descended to it in order to obtain water. Behind the village, ascending the Cachales, there is a cavern on the steep side of the rock, which, during the Greek War of Independence, received a great number of fugitives. It is very spacious, is supplied with excellent water, and is quite impregnable. This is probably the place where the inhabitants of Neon and the surrounding places took refuge in the Persian invasion, as the Delphians did in the Corycian cave, more especially as the height immediately above the village is not adapted for such a purpose. A difficult mule path leads at present through the ravine of the Cachales across the heights of Parnassus to Delphi. In the time of Pausanias there were two roads from Tithorea across the mountain to Delphi, one direct, the other longer, but practicable for carriages.

In the territory of Tithorea, but at the distance of 70 stadia from the city, was a temple of Asclepius, and also, at the distance of 40 stadia, a shrine of Isis. The temple of Asclepius had an image of the god with a beard, made of stone, to which all the Phocians worshiped, and could sacrifice anything except goats. In the temple there were houses for the supplicants and for the servants of the temple and there was even a bed to the right of the image of Asclepius. The shrine of Isis was within a sacred precinct, where only those whom the goddess had invited in dreams could have access, according to the inhabitants of Tithorea. Celebrations were held in honor of Isis twice a year, in spring and at the end of autumn. Three days before each feast those who could access the site were purified with a secret rite; the first day, if they found any part of the victims of the previous feast, they would pick them up and bury them in a place that was two stadia away. On the second day, the merchants built tents with reeds and other improvised materials and on the third day slaves and animals dressed in gold and silver were sold. After noon the sacrifices were celebrated, in which the richest would sacrifice oxen and deer, while poorer people would geese and guinea fowl. Pigs, sheep and goats could not be slaughtered. The victims were wrapped in cloth and arranged in the Egyptian way. Then there was a procession with the victims and finally the stores were burned.
