= White hellebore =

White hellebore or white false hellebore is a common name for several plants and may refer to:

- Veratrum album, native to Europe and western Asia
- Veratrum californicum, native to North America
- Veratrum viride, native to North America
