= Distomo-Arachova-Antikyra =

Distomo-Arachova-Antikyra Δίστομο-Αράχοβα-Αντίκυρα
- Municipality
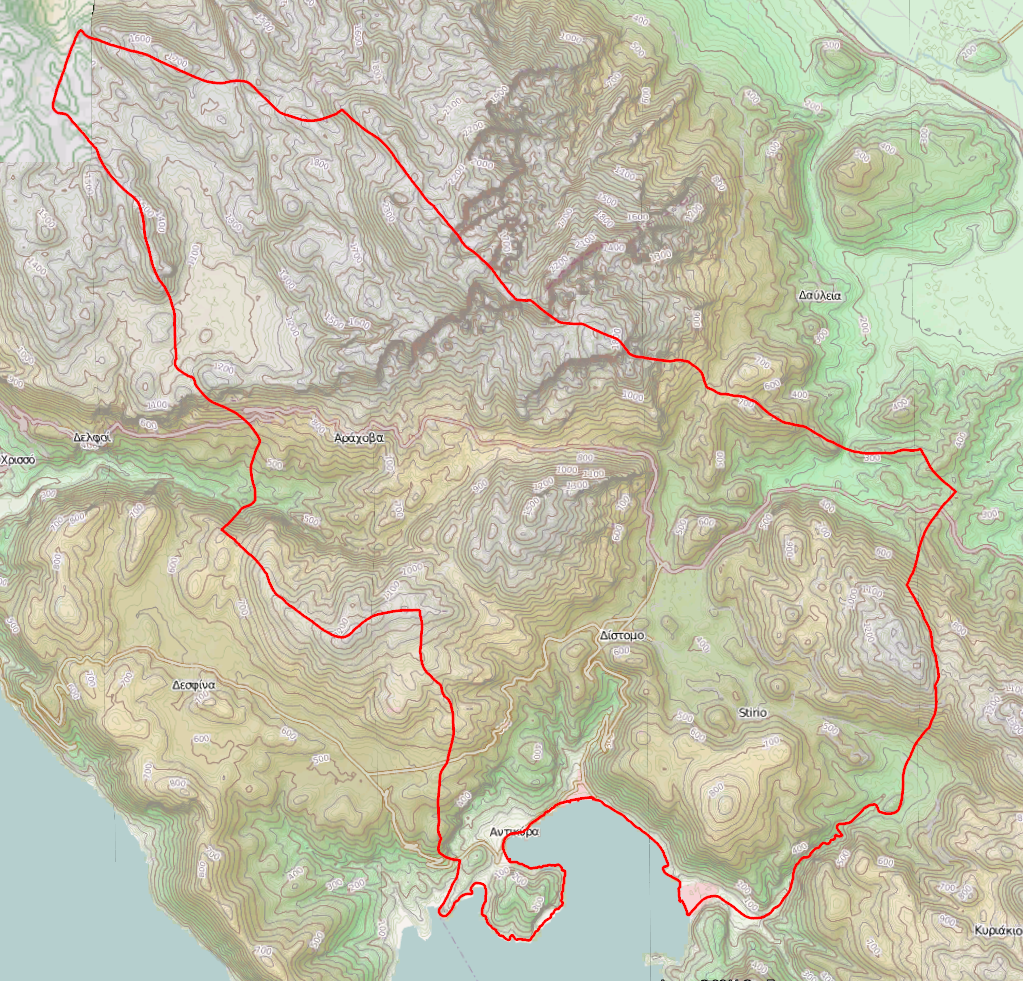

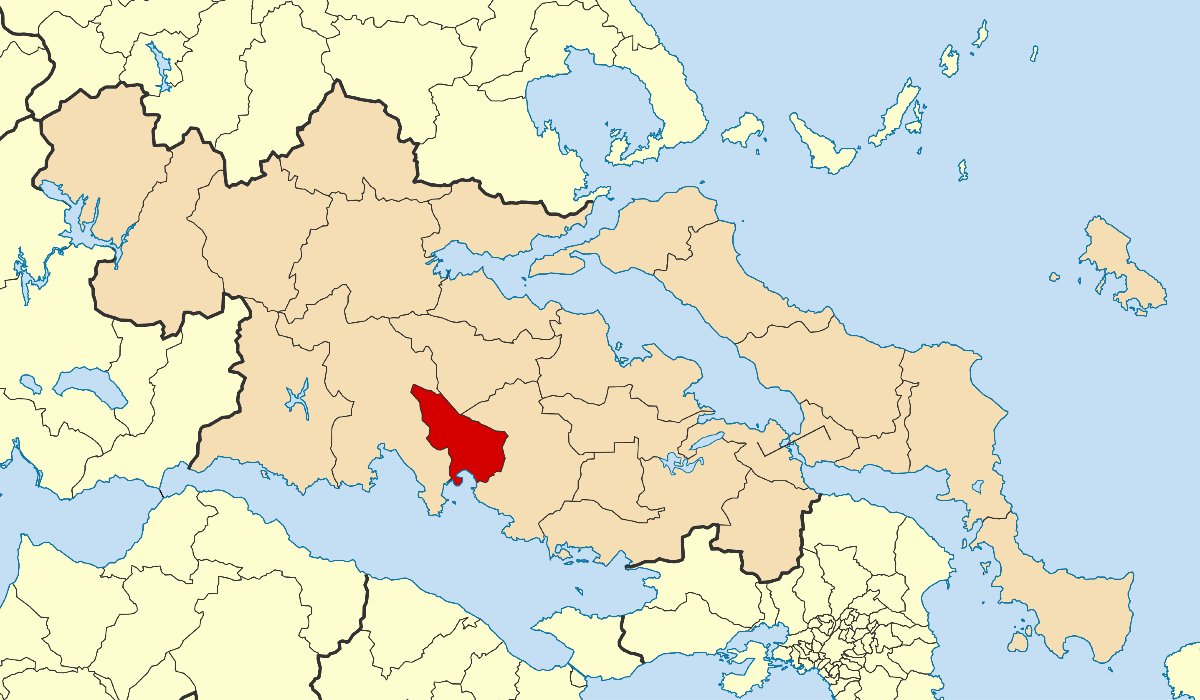

- Location within Greece
- Coordinates: 38°26′N 22°40′E
- Country: Greece
- Administrative region: Central Greece
- Regional unit: Boeotia

Government
  - Mayor: Ioannis Stathas (since 2019)

Area
  - Municipality: 294.05 km^{2} (113.53 sq mi)

Population (2021)
  - Municipality: 7,612
  - Density: 25.89/km^{2} (67.05/sq mi)
- Time zone: UTC+2 (EET)
  - Summer (DST): UTC+3 (EEST)
- Website: http://www.daa.gov.gr/

Distomo-Arachova-Antikyra (Greek: Δίστομο-Αράχοβα-Αντίκυρα) is a municipality in the Boeotia regional unit, Central Greece, Greece. The seat of the municipality is the town Distomo. The municipality has an area of 294.05 km^{2}.

== Municipality ==
The municipality Distomo–Arachova–Antikyra was formed at the 2011 local government reform, according to the programme Callicrates, by the merger of the following 2 former municipalities of Arachova and Distomo and from the former community Antikyra, that became municipal units:

- Antikyra
- Arachova
- Distomo
