= Distomo =

Town in Boeotia, Greece

Distomo Δίστομο
- Municipal unit
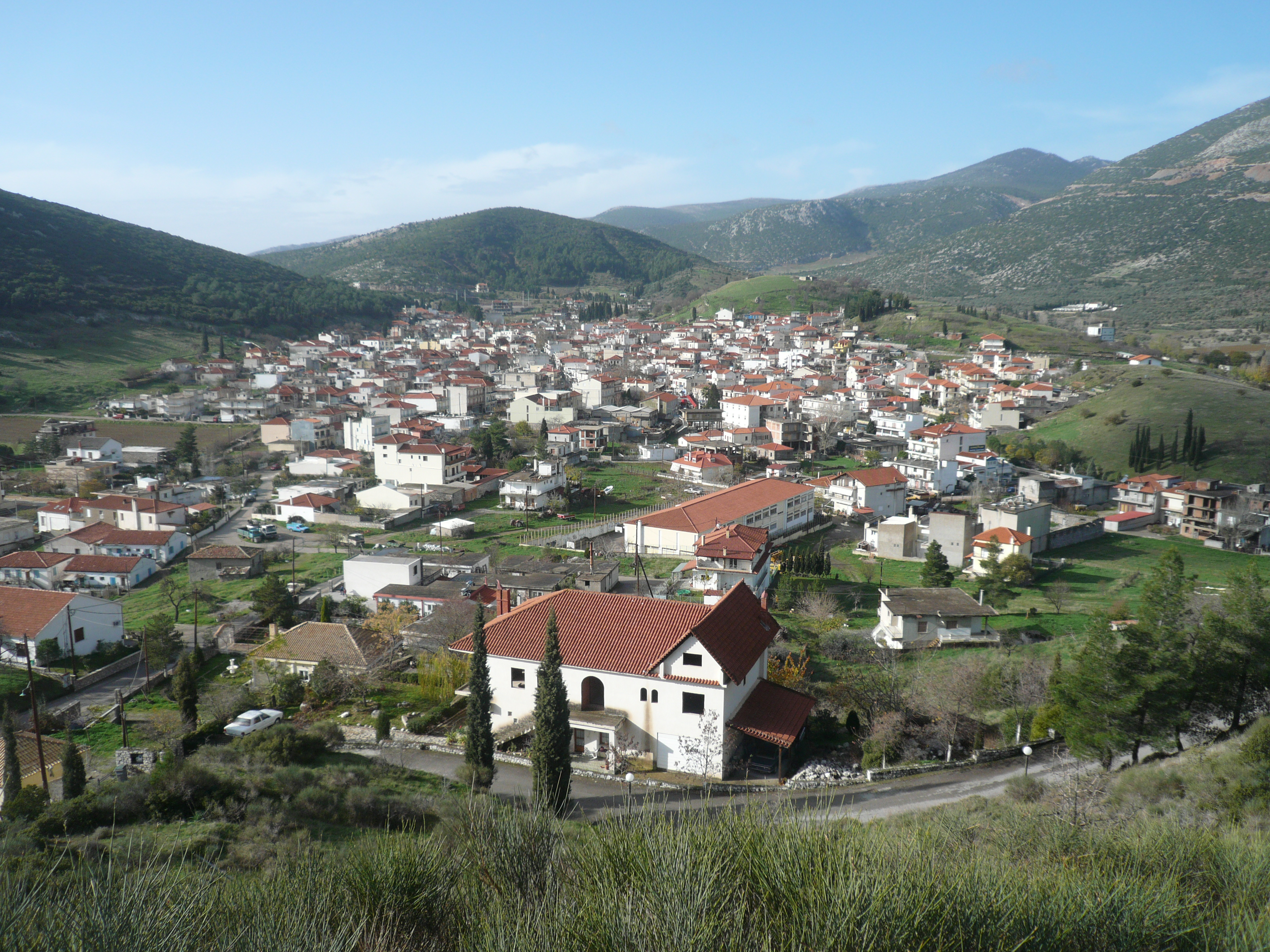

- Seal

- Location within the regional unit

- Location within Greece
- Coordinates: 38°26′N 22°40′E
- Country: Greece
- Administrative region: Central Greece
- Regional unit: Boeotia
- Municipality: Distomo-Arachova-Antikyra

Area
  - Municipal unit: 131.27 km^{2} (50.68 sq mi)
  - Community: 80.498 km^{2} (31.080 sq mi)
- Elevation: 218 m (715 ft)

Population (2021)
  - Municipal unit: 3,644
  - Municipal unit density: 27.76/km^{2} (71.90/sq mi)
  - Community: 3,085
  - Community density: 38.32/km^{2} (99.26/sq mi)
- Time zone: UTC+2 (EET)
  - Summer (DST): UTC+3 (EEST)
- Vehicle registration: ΒΙ
- Website: http://www.daa.gov.gr

"Distomo" may also refer to a work by Federico García Lorca

Distomo (Greek: Δίστομο) is a town in western Boeotia, Greece. Since the 2011 local government reform, it is part of the municipality Distomo-Arachova-Antikyra, of which it is the seat and a municipal unit. The municipal unit has an area of 131.270 km^{2}, the community 80.498 km^{2}. As of 2021, the population is 3,644. Distomo is situated in the western foothills of Mount Helicon, at about 450 m elevation. It is 5 km north of the Gulf of Corinth coast, 9 km southeast of Arachova, 12 km east of Desfina, 16 km southeast of Delphi, 18 km west of Livadeia and 105 km northwest of Athens. The Greek National Road 48 (Naupactus - Arachova - Livadeia) passes north of the town.

Distomo is known as the site of the Distomo massacre that was perpetrated by the German army against the local inhabitants during the Second World War.

One of the most important monuments of Byzantine architecture and a UNESCO World Heritage Site, the monastery of Hosios Loukas is situated close to Distomo.

During the ancient Greek times there was a settlement called Amvryssos (Amvrossos), part of which is buried under Distomo. There is an archaeological museum in Distomo officially called Distomo Archaeological Collection with a fine exhibit of ancient pottery and artifacts. The local football team is also named Amvrysseas after the ancient Greek city.

Aluminium of Greece has its production facilities in the coastal village Agios Nikolaos. Other industries include agriculture and services.

== Subdivisions ==
The municipal unit Distomo is subdivided into the following communities (constituent villages in brackets):

- Distomo (Distomo, Agios Nikolaos, Paralia Distomou)
- Steiri (Steiri, Hosios Loukas monastery)

== Population ==
Year	Village population	Community population	Municipal unit population
1981	-	-	5,604
1991	2,156	-	-
2001	2,048	3,350	4,368
2011	1,589	3,192	3,881
2021	1,368	3,085	3,644

== History ==
The ancient Phocean city of Amvrissos (Amvrossos) is located on the site of modern Distomo and its broader area.

On 10 June 1944, Distomo was the site of a massacre of civilians by the Germans, which constituted a war crime. The massacre was meant as "retribution" for the previous death of three Germans at the hands of local guerrillas, even though the villagers had no relation to the guerrillas.

The 4th SS Polizei Division perpetrated grave crimes, with superiors encouraging the soldiers. Among the crimes was ripping out the intestines of a baby and splattering them on a close relative.

Decades later, a Greek court awarded restitution to Greek victims, but the German government pressed Greece politically to nullify that decision.

To enforce the decision by the Greek court, this case was brought before an Italian court, Greece being unwilling to enforce their own decisions. The judges awarded the plaintiffs the Villa Vigoni in Menaggio, Italy, a German government-sponsored nonprofit foundation. The German government appealed the decision by the Italian supreme civil court for restitutions at the International Court of Justice, claiming state immunity.
