= Aluminium of Greece =

Greek aluminium producing company

Coordinates: 38°21′49″N 22°41′24″E

Aluminium of Greece Αλουμίνιο της Ελλάδος
- Company type: Private
- Founded: 1960 by Pechiney
- Headquarters: Marousi, Athens, Greece
- Key people: Spyros Kasdas (Chairman)
- Products: aluminium
- Revenue: ▼€562.47 million (2016)
- Total assets: ▲€1.056 billion (2016)
- Total equity: ▲€261.25 million (2016)
- Number of employees: 1,300 (2014)
- Parent: Mytilineos Holdings
- Website: www.alhellas.gr

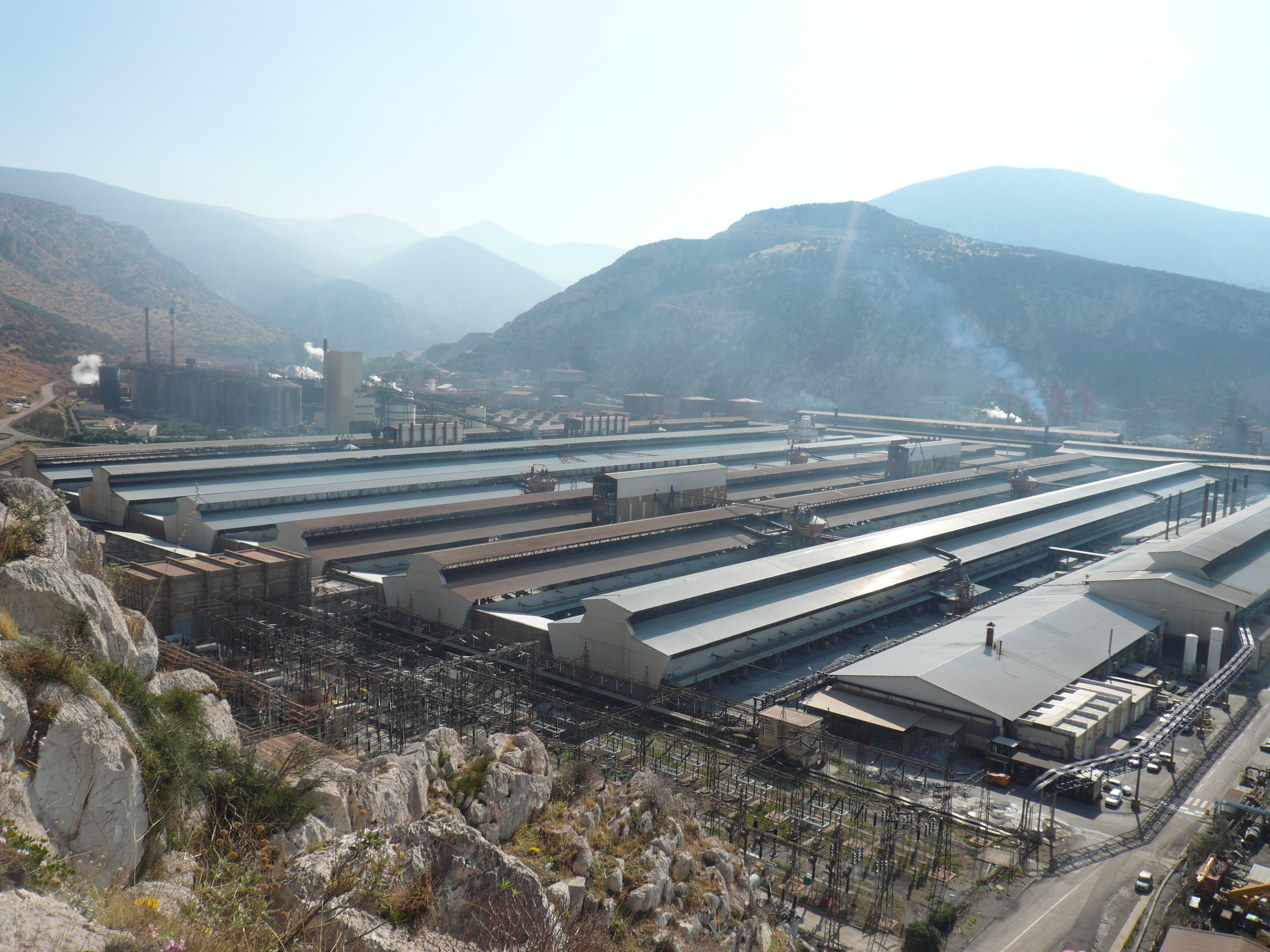
Plant of Aluminium de Grece

Aluminium of Greece (Greek: Αλουμίνιο της Ελλάδος, Aloumínio tēs Elládos; French: Aluminium de Grèce) was founded in 1960 by a conglomerate including French aluminium producer Pechiney. Its headquarters are in Marousi, Athens. Its production plant is located at Agios Nikolaos, near Distomo in Boeotia, on the north coast of the Gulf of Corinth. The site combines proximity to the large bauxite deposits of Boeotia and Phocis and sea transportation facilities, with unobtrusive integration into the surrounding area. The annual production capacity of this industrial complex is : 800,000 tonnes of alumina and 165,000 tonnes of aluminium.

1,100 people are directly employed by the plant. Since 2005 it is member of Mytilineos Holdings. The company has been listed on the Athens Stock Exchange since 1973. The company also owns Delphi-Distomon mining company.

Aluminium of Greece also owns Agios Nikolaos Port, a dock capable of accommodating and serving boats up to 50,000 tonnes deadweight (DWT).

== Installations ==
Established in an area of Greece rich in bauxite deposits, the company's plants are: a bauxite processing unit for the production of alumina and an alumina processing unit for the production of aluminium.

=== Capacity ===
The plant processes :

- 1,400,000 tonnes of Greek, and
- 200,000 tonnes of Tropical Bauxite.

The plant produces :

- 800,000 tonnes of alumina.
- 165,000 tonnes of aluminium.

Aluminium of Greece has around 1,100 employees.

== See also ==
- Mytilineos Holdings
