= Alkyonides Gulf =

Bay within the Gulf of Corinth in Greece

Coordinates: 38.12°N 23.07°E

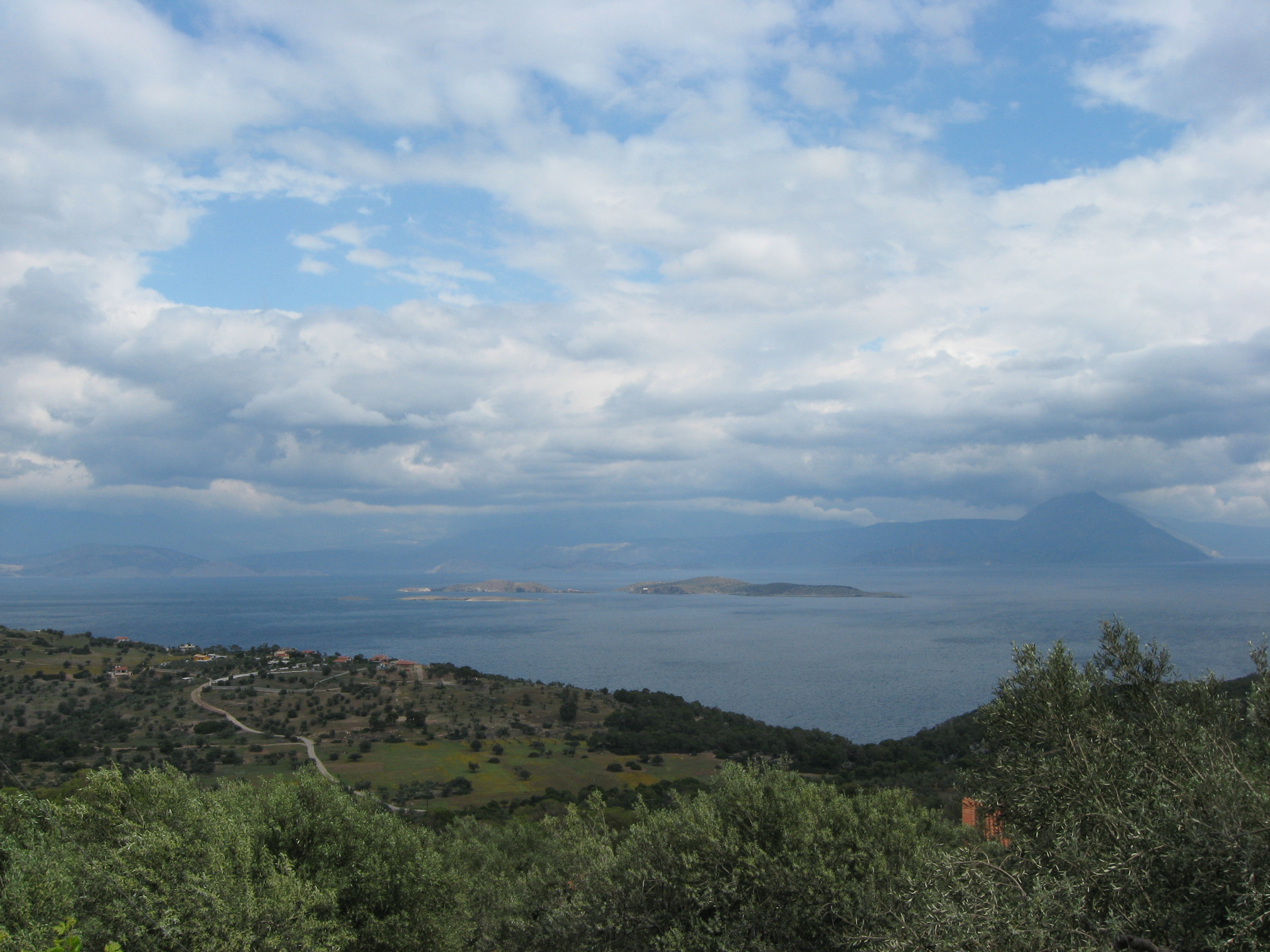

The Alkyonides Gulf (Greek: Κόλπος Αλκυονίδων, romanized: Kolpos Alkyonidon) is a bay in Greece located within the eastern part of the much larger Gulf of Corinth. The bay is approximately 20 to 25 km long and 20 km wide. It stretches from Aigosthena to Cape Trachilos from east to west and from Cape Trachilos to the peninsula of Perachora from north to south. Three regional units surround the gulf: Corinthia to the south, West Attica to the east and Boeotia to the north. Except for the Megaris Plain to the southeast, mountains surround the gulf. These mountains include the Geraneia to the south, Pateras to the east, Cithaeron to the northeast and Mount Helicon to the north. Beaches include Mikra Strava, Strava, Mavrolimni, Kato Alepochori, Aigosthena, Alyki and Paralia Korinis. The Alcyonides Islands, which are also known as Kala Nisia (literal translation: "Nice Islands"), lie in the western end. These islands include Daskalio, Prasonisi and Zoodochos Pigi. More islands, including Fonias and Makronisos lie to the extreme north. Kouveli, in the Domvrenas Bay, also lies in the north.

== Bays by the gulf ==
- Chinou Bay, south
- Psatha Bay, southeast
- Aigosthena Bay, east
- Livadostras Bay, northeast
- Domvraina Bay, northwest

== Places by the gulf ==
- Agia Sotira, south
- Mavrolimni, southeast
- Aigeirouses, southeast
- Kato Alepochori, southeast
- Aigosthena, east
- Agios Vasileios, northeast
- Alyki, north
