= Erythrae (Boeotia) =

Ancient town in Boeotia, Greece

Coordinates: 38°14′09″N 23°24′13″E

Erythrae or Erythrai (Ancient Greek: Ἐρυθραί) was a town in ancient Boeotia, mentioned by Homer among the Boeotians ruled by Thersander in the Catalogue of Ships in the Iliad. It lay a little south of the Asopus, at the foot of Mount Cithaeron. The camp of Mardonius extended along the Asopus from Erythrae and past Hysiae to the territory of Plataea. Erythrae is frequently mentioned by other authorities in connection with Hysiae. Apollodorus records the town as Erythra (Ἐρυθρά). It was in ruins in the time of Pausanias (second century).

The site of Erythrae is at a place called Darimari in the current town of Erythres.
