= Creusis =

Ancient port town of Boeotia

Coordinates: 38°12′29″N 23°06′37″E

Creusis or Kreusis (Ancient Greek: Κρεῦσις), or Creusa or Kreousa (Κρέουσα), also Creusia or Kreousia (Κρεουσία), was a town of ancient Boeotia, at the head of a small bay in the Corinthian Gulf, described by ancient writers as the port of Thespiae. The navigation from Peloponnesus to Creusis is described by Pausanias as insecure, on account of the many headlands which it was necessary to double, and of the violent gusts of wind rushing down from the mountains. Creusis was on the borders of Megaris. One of the highest points of Mount Cithaeron projects into the sea between Creusis and Aegosthena, the frontier town in Megaris, leaving no passage along the shore except a narrow path on the side of the mountain. In confirmation of Pausanias, William Martin Leake, who visited the site in the 19th century, remarks that this termination of Mt. Cithaeron, as well as all the adjoining part of the Alcyonic Sea, is subject to sudden gusts of wind, by which the passage of such a cornice is sometimes rendered dangerous. On two occasions the Lacedaemonians retreated from Boeotia by this route, in order to avoid the more direct roads across Mt. Cithaeron. On the first of these occasions, in 378 BCE, the Lacedaemonian army under Cleombrotus I was overtaken by such a violent storm that the shields of the soldiers were wrested from their hands by the wind, and many of the beasts of burden were blown over the precipices. The second time that they took this route was after the fatal Battle of Leuctra, in 371 BCE.

Its site is located near modern Livadostro.
