= Mandhra =

Mandhra may refer to:

- Mandhra, Khyber Pakhtunkhwa - a town in Pakistan
- an alternative spelling of Mandra, a town in Attica, Greece
