= Stefani, Boeotia =

Stefani Στεφάνη
- Community
- Location within Greece
- Coordinates: 38°10′N 23°33′E
- Country: Greece
- Administrative region: Central Greece
- Regional unit: Boeotia
- Municipality: Tanagra
- Municipal unit: Dervenochoria

Population (2021)
  - Community: 385
- Time zone: UTC+2 (EET)
  - Summer (DST): UTC+3 (EEST)

Stefani (Greek: Στεφάνη, before 1927: Κρώρα - Krora) is a settlement in Boeotia, Greece. Stefani is part of the municipal unit Dervenochoria, which is part of the municipality Tanagra.

== Population ==
Year	Population
1981	230
1991	453
2001	286
2011	239
2021	385

== Geography ==
Stefani is situated at the northwestern edge of the Parnitha mountain, and east of the Pastra mountain. It is in a rather sparsely populated agricultural area, with forests to the south. Stefani lies 4 km south of Skourta, 6 km southeast of Pyli, 14 km north of Elefsina and 27 km northwest of Athens.

== See also ==
- List of settlements in Boeotia
