= Alyki, Boeotia =

Alyki Αλυκή
- Settlement
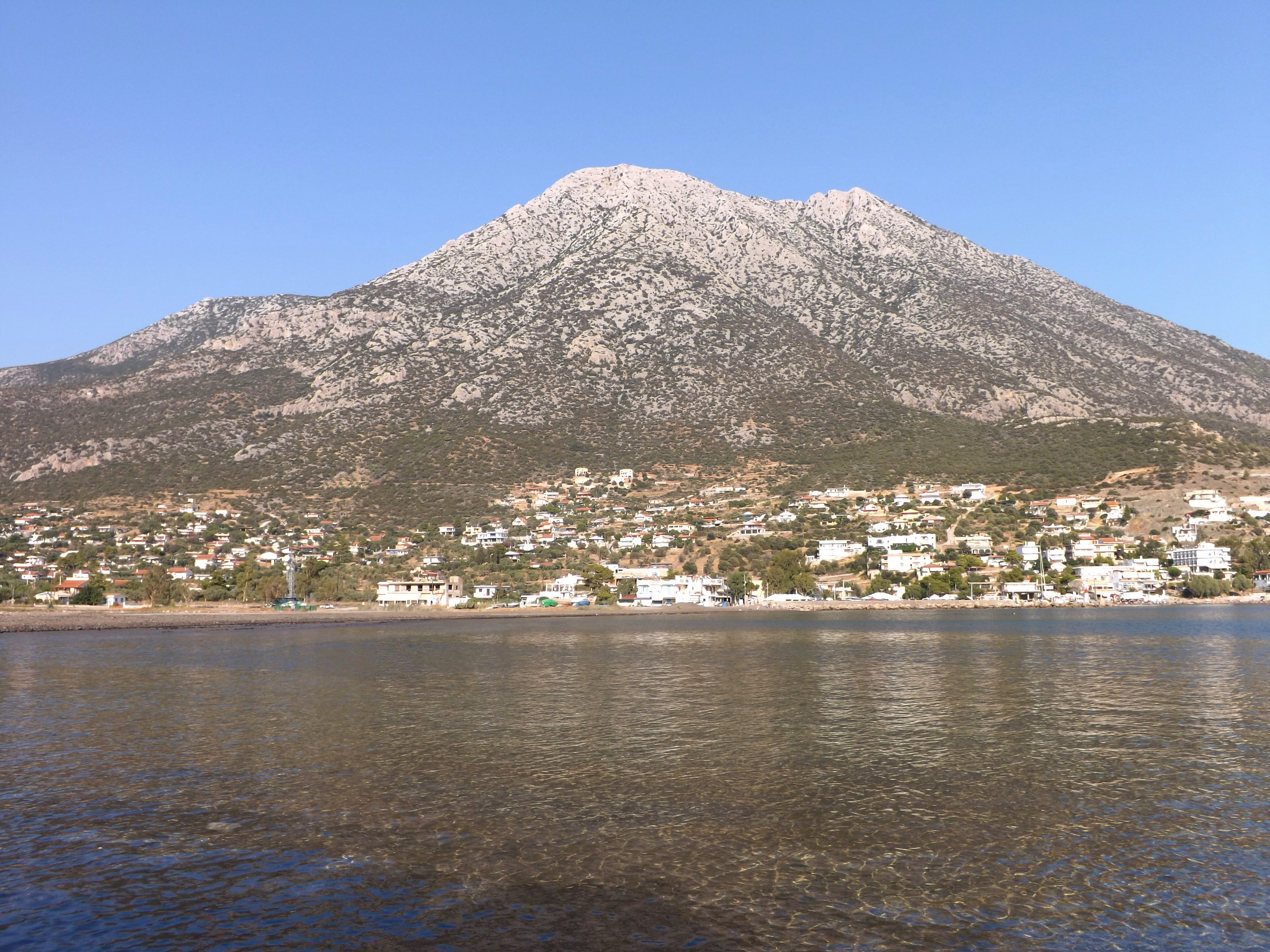
- A view of Alyki.

- Location within Greece
- Coordinates: 38°11.8′N 23°3.2′E
- Country: Greece
- Administrative region: Central Greece
- Regional unit: Boeotia
- Municipality: Thebes
- Municipal unit: Thisvi
- Community: Xironomi
- Elevation: 40 m (130 ft)

Population (2021)
  - Total: 258
- Time zone: UTC+2 (EET)
  - Summer (DST): UTC+3 (EEST)
- Postal code: 320 10
- Area code: +30-2264
- Vehicle registration: BI

Alyki (Greek: Αλυκή) is a village of the Thebes municipality. Before the 2011 local government reform it was a part of the municipality of Thisvi. Alyki is a part of the community of Xironomi.

== Population ==
Historical population
| Year | Pop. | ±% |
|---|---|---|
| 2001 | 138 | — |
| 2011 | 279 | +102.2% |
| 2021 | 258 | −7.5% |

== See also ==
- List of settlements in Boeotia
