= Pateras (mountain) =

Mountain in Greece

- Location within Greece

Highest point
- Elevation: 1,131 m (3,711 ft)
- Coordinates: 38°06′32″N 23°20′06″E

Geography
- Location: Attica, Greece

Pateras (Greek: Πατέρας) is a mountain of West Attica, Greece, with an elevation of 1,131 meters. Its highest peak is named Leontari. It is situated between the plain of Eleusis (Thriasian Plain) and the plain of Megara, and stretches between the Gulf of Corinth at Aigosthena and the Saronic Gulf near Eleusis. It is separated from its northern neighbour Cithaeron by the plain of Vilia. The mountain is covered with woods with Aleppo pine and Mediterranean maquis. In the tops of the mountain, that belong to a CORINE biotope, there are firs, of species Abies cephalonica.

Settlements around the mountain include Aigosthena to the northwest, Vilia to the north, Mandra to the east, Nea Peramos to the southeast, Megara to the south and Kato Alepochori to the west.
