= 2017 West Attica floods =

Natural disaster in Greece

Part of Cyclone Numa
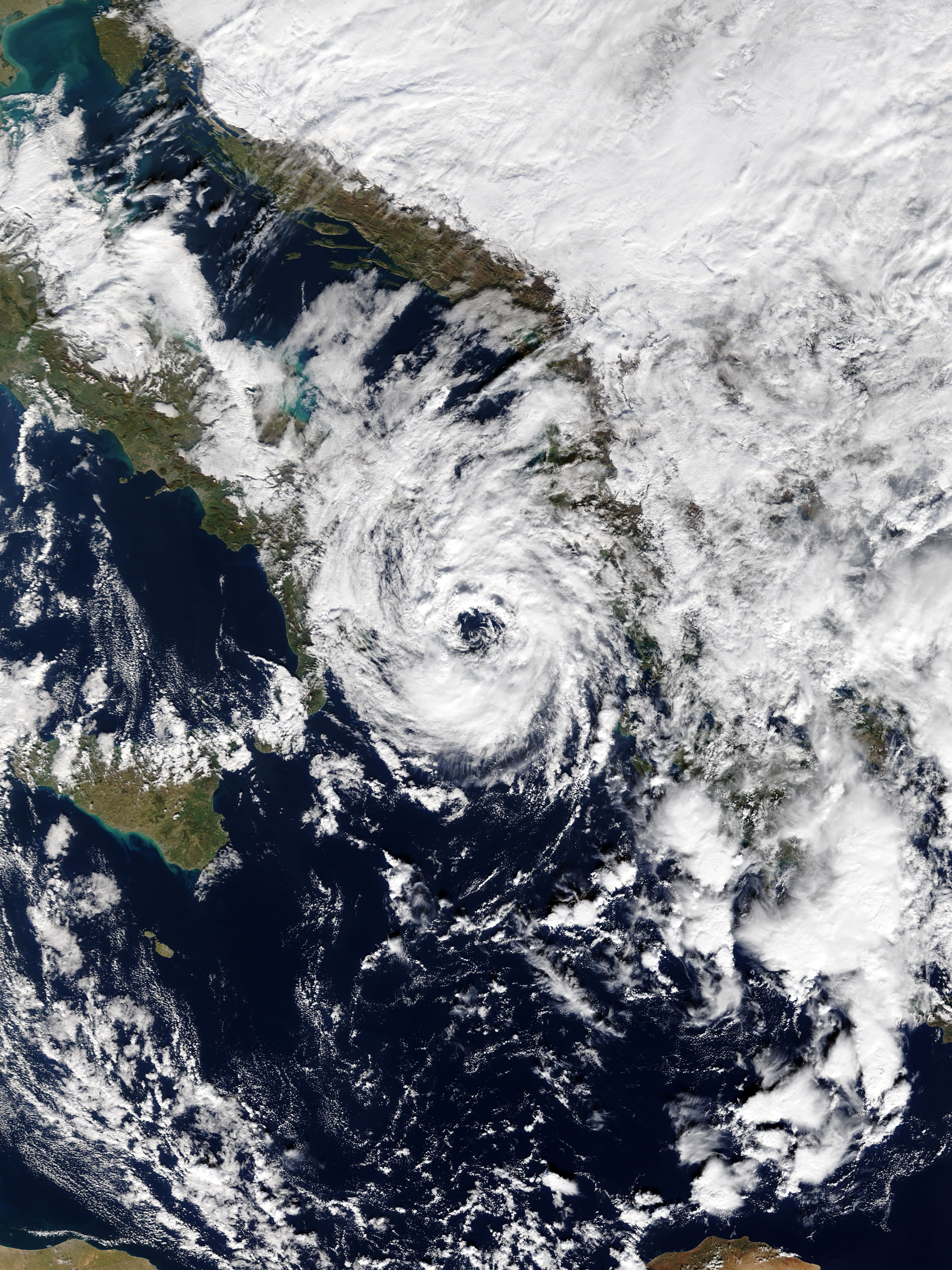
- Date: November 2017
- Location: Greece
- Cause: Cyclone Numa
- Deaths: 24
- Property damage: ~1,520 buildings damaged

During the morning hours of 15 November 2017, after heavy rainfall caused because of the barometric low Eurydice and the Cyclone Numa, flooding occurred in Western Attica and mainly in Mandra, Nea Peramos, Magoula and Elefsina. The floods killed 24 people and caused severe damage. This is the third largest flood in Attica based on the number of dead.

== Aftermath ==
Eurydice was a deep meteorological low that struck Western and Southern Greece as well as the Dodecanese in November 2017. Disasters occurred in Nafplio, Symi, Crete and Corfu. The areas most affected were Mandra and Nea Peramos. Cars were swept away by the waters and ended up in the sea or streams, and in some of them the passengers drowned. The old highway was turned into a river, as were the streets of Athens. There have been cases of theft in homes and shops damaged by the floods. Many areas were left without electricity for hours. Victims were hosted on a cruise ship. Three days of mourning were declared in the country.

The death toll was 24 people, of whom 23 in Mandra and one in Nea Peramos.

In Mandra 1064 buildings, and in particular 794 houses, 126 business premises, 8 public buildings and 136 warehouses and basements, were damaged. In the area of Megara and Nea Peramos at least 448 buildings were destroyed, of which 228 were residential, 38 business premises, 6 public buildings and 123 warehouses and basements.

Deaths and flood damage provoked political reactions.

The Municipality of Athens sent significant material assistance to the victims of West Attica, while the Ministry of Labor, Social Security and Social Solidarity decided to provide facilities to companies, employers or insured persons who had a professional establishment or activity in the areas and suffered damages.
