= Vilia =

Vilia Βίλια
- Municipal unit
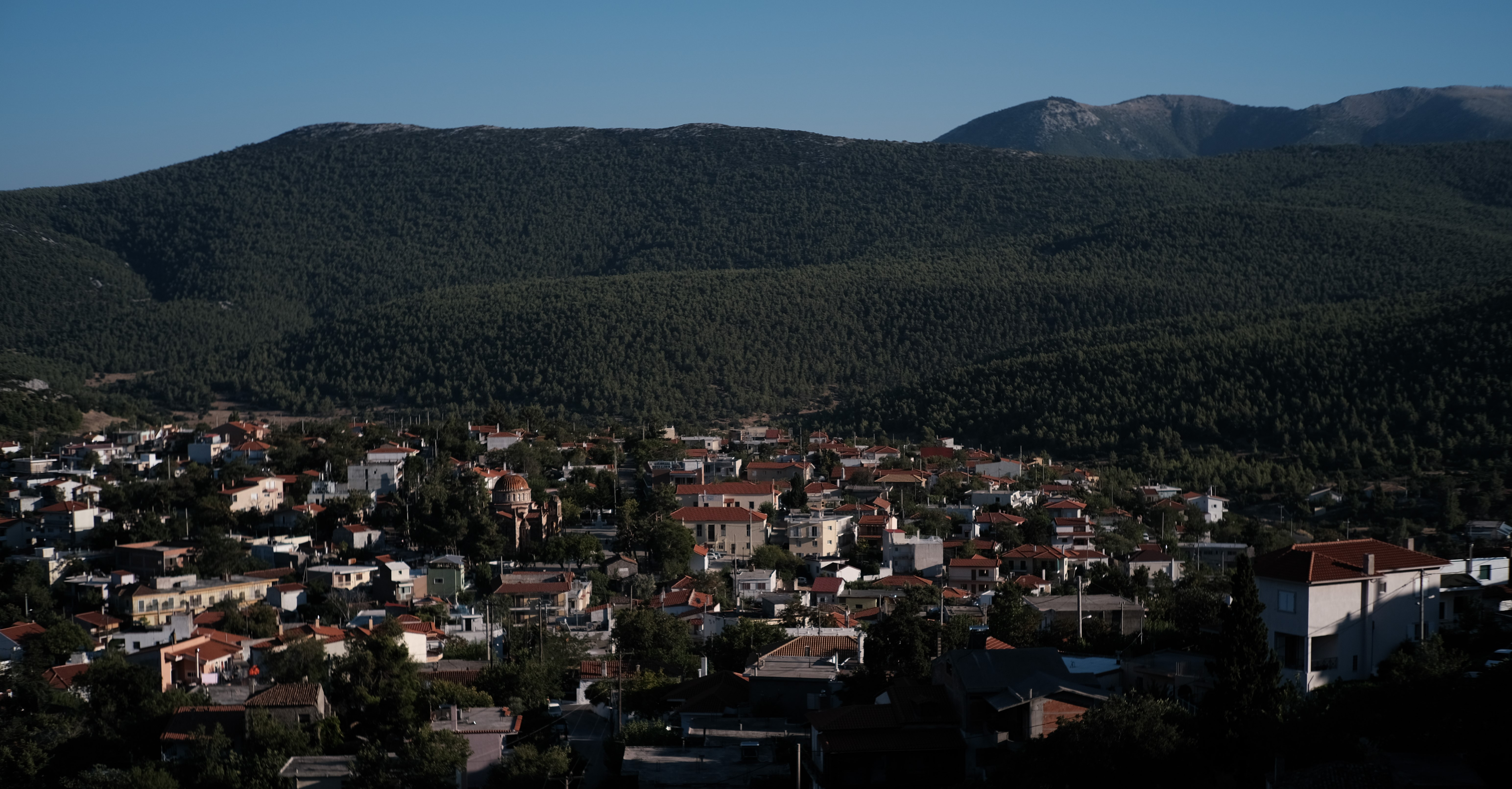
- View of Vilia from the west

- Location within the regional unit

- Location within Greece
- Coordinates: 38°10′N 23°20′E
- Country: Greece
- Administrative region: Attica
- Regional unit: West Attica
- Municipality: Mandra-Eidyllia

Area
  - Municipal unit: 144.851 km^{2} (55.927 sq mi)
- Elevation: 301 m (988 ft)

Population (2021)
  - Municipal unit: 2,514
  - Municipal unit density: 17.36/km^{2} (44.95/sq mi)
- Time zone: UTC+2 (EET)
  - Summer (DST): UTC+3 (EEST)
- Postal code: 190 06
- Area code: 22630
- Vehicle registration: Z
- Website: www.vilia.org

Vilia (Greek: Βίλια; formerly Eidyllia, Ειδυλλία) is a village and a former municipality of West Attica, Greece. Since the 2011 local government reform it is part of the municipality Mandra-Eidyllia, of which it is a municipal unit. Its population was 2,514 at the 2021 census. It is part of Athens metropolitan area. The inhabitants of Vilia are Arvanites.

== Geography ==
The municipal unit Vilia covers the mountainous northwestern part of Attica, and has a land area of 144.851 km^{2}. The main mountain ranges are Cithaeron (1,409 m) in the northwest and Pastra in the northeast. In the west it stretches along the coast of the Alkyonides Gulf, a bay of the Gulf of Corinth. The village Vilia, the largest in the municipal unit, lies in the easternmost part, at the southeastern foot of Cithaeron. Vilia is 6 km south of Erythres, 7 km west of Oinoi, 10 km east of the coastal village Aigosthena, 17 km south of Thebes and 40 km northwest of Athens.

The municipal unit's largest villages are Vilia (pop. 1,269 in 2011), Kato Alepochori (220), Aigosthena (80), Veniza (52), and Agios Nektarios (40).

== Subdivisions ==
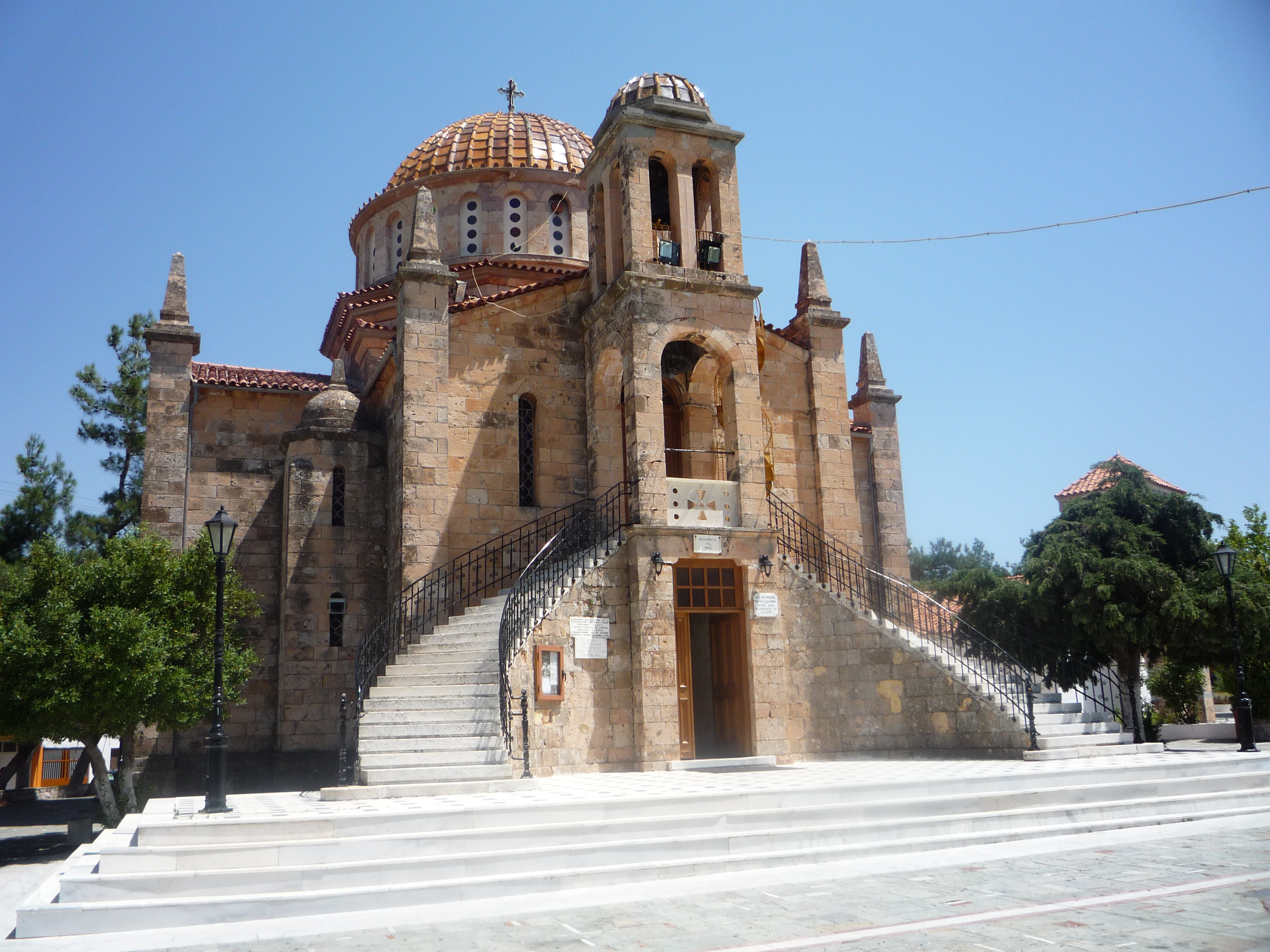
Metamorfosis Sotiros Church, designed by Ernst Ziller

The municipal unit Vilia consists of the following villages:

- Vilia
- Agia Paraskevi
- Agios Konstantinos
- Agios Nektarios
- Aigosthena (also Porto Germeno)
- Ano Alepochori
- Veniza
- Kato Alepochori
- Kryo Pigadi
- Loumpa
- Mytikas
- Profitis Ilias
- Psatha

== Historical population ==
Year	Town population	Municipal unit population
1981	2,427	-
1991	1,912	3,412
2001	1,955	3,215
2011	1,269	1,753
2021	1,587	2,514

== Places of interest ==
Vilia is located near several points of interest, including:

- The seaside village of Porto Germeno, including the ancient fortress of Aigosthena.
- The popular beach of Psatha.
- The ancient fortress of Eleutherai.
- The ancient towers of Vathychoria.
- The Church of the Transfiguration of Christ, designed by famous architect Ernst Ziller.

== Notable people ==
- Ellie Lambeti (1926–1983) actress
