= Archetimus =

Ancient personal name

Archetimus (Ancient Greek: Ἀρχέτιμος) was the name of several persons in the ancient world.

== Archetimus of Syracuse ==
Archetimus of Syracuse, Magna Graecia, was an ancient writer who wrote an account of the interview of Thales of Miletus and the other Seven Sages of Greece with Cypselus, tyrant of ancient Corinth, at which Archetimus claimed to have been present. However, as others have observed, some of the seven sages, like Chilon of Sparta, are not believed to have lived at the same time as Cypselus, so this account is to be treated with skepticism.

== Archetimus of Erythrae ==
The writer Stobaeus records an anecdote of a certain Archetimus of Erythrae, whom his friend Cydias attempted to defraud. Whether this is an actual historical personage is unknown.

== Archetimus, son of Eurytimus ==
There was also an Archetimus mentioned in the History of the Peloponnesian War of Thucydides, as commanding a body of ground troops for ancient Corinth.

== Archetimus, father of Celsus ==
Still another Archetimus is mentioned as being the father of Celsus, a teacher of philosophy in the 4th century, who was said to have taught Roman youths pro bono.
