= Aigosthena =

Ancient Greek fortified port city of Megaris

- Αἰγόσθενα (Ancient Greek)
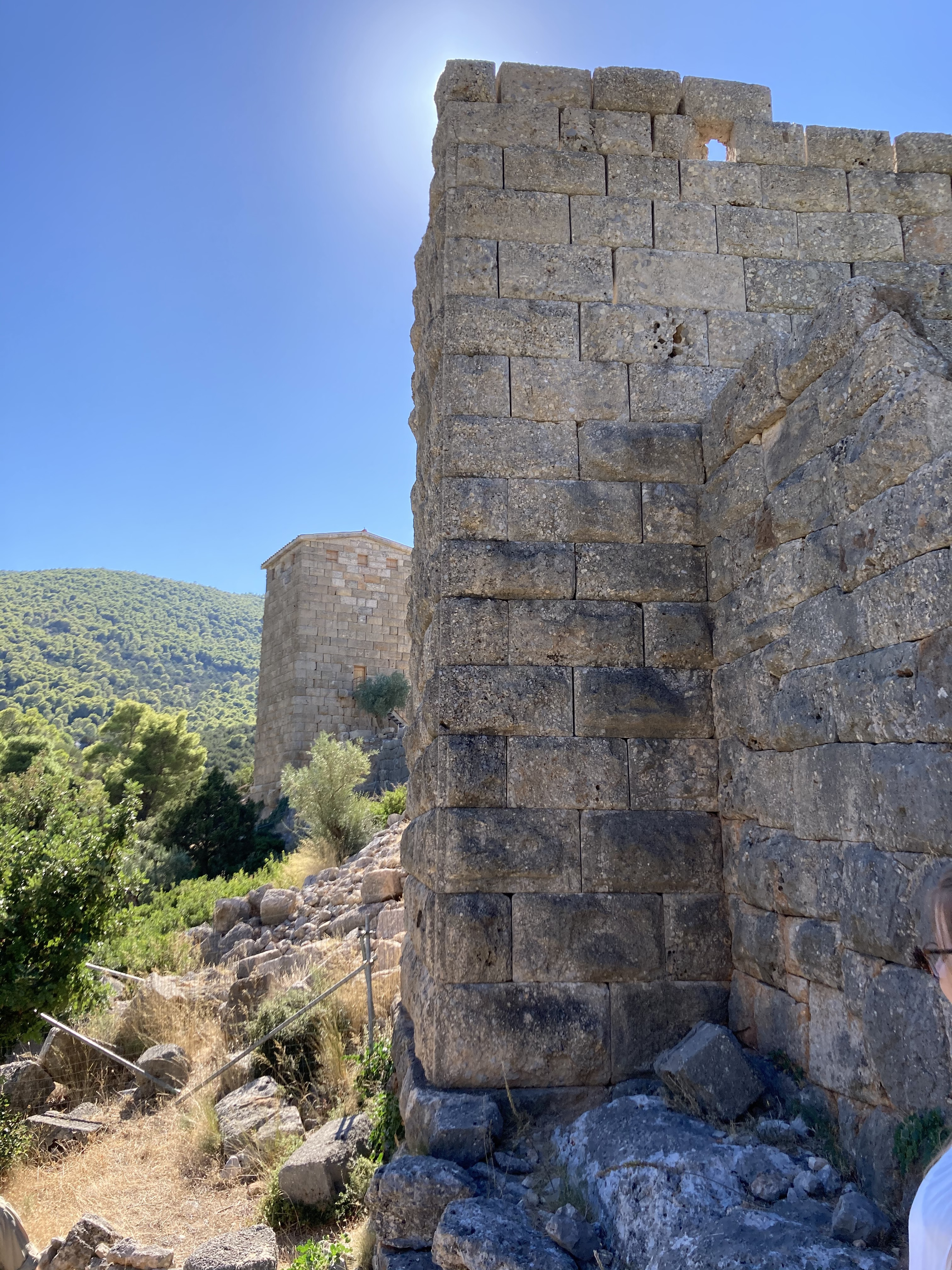
- The fortifications with the recently restored southeast tower of the citadel at back from NE, just outside of the citadel.

- Location within Greece
- 38°8′51″N 23°13′43″E
- Type: Settlement
- Periods: Classical Greek to Hellenistic
- Satellite of: Megara
- Location: Mandra-Eidyllia, Attica, Greece
- Region: Megaris

Site notes
- Management: Ephorate of Antiquities of West Attica
- Public access: Yes
- Website: Aegosthena

Aigosthena (Ancient Greek: Αἰγόσθενα (Aigósthenă); also transcribed Egosthena) was an ancient Greek fortified port city of Megaris, 19 km (12 mi) northwest of the ancient city of Megara to which it belonged. It is also the name of the coastal settlement at the foot of the ancient city walls, also known as Porto Germeno. The ancient citadel which stands at the foot of Mt Cithaeron and extends down to the sea at the inlet of Aigosthena, on the east side of the Gulf of Corinth, is famous for retaining several of the tallest surviving towers of ancient Greece.

== Geography ==
Aigosthena is situated on the Alkyonides Gulf, a bay of the Gulf of Corinth. It is surrounded by forested mountains: the Cithaeron to the north and the Pateras to the south. Aigosthena was historically the northernmost city of the Megaris (Megarida). It is 10 km west of Vilia, 20 km southwest of Thebes 48 km (30 mi) northwest of Athens.

== Ancient Aigosthena ==
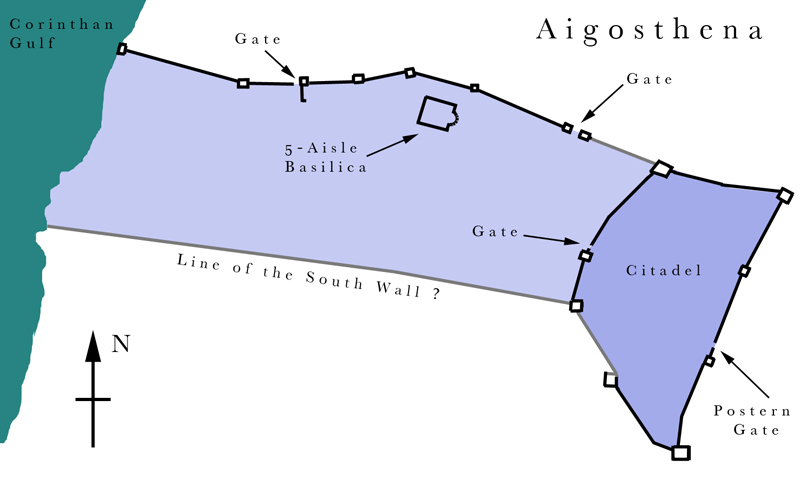
Plan of Ancient Aigosthena.

The ancient site of Aigosthena consisted of a fortified citadel connected to the sea by two fortification walls; the fortress consisting of the acropolis citadel and the lower town. The acropolis stands on a low hill, 450m from the sea. Measuring roughly 90 by 187 m (~575 Doric feet), the citadel was roughly trapezoidal in plan, with the narrower side (113m) facing west toward the sea. The citadel was constructed along the contours of a 55 m hill, and was defended by eight artillery towers incorporated into its perimeter wall. There was a primary gate on the west side into the area between the north and south walls to the sea. A small postern (auxiliary) gate was located immediately north of the second tower on the eastern side. The northern of the two walls to the sea is well preserved, stretching 370 m to a final tower of which the foundations and fallen blocks are now underwater. The northern wall consisted of six towers and a fortified gate running in a nearly straight line from the northwest corner of the citadel to the sea. The bed of a river runs along the probably line of the south wall, which is not evident.

The walls were built in a variety of masonry styles, which may be evidence of different phases of construction. Masonry styles in use include isodomic (ashlars with hammered faces and drafted corners), pseudo-isodomic, and - in sections – a style approaching polygonal. In general terms, these walls are among the best preserved of any of the Hellenistic period and show a high level of skill and finish. There is clear evidence of quarrying immediately south of the southeast tower of the citadel.

Based on the design of the defense towers, Ober proposes that the site was fortified after 370 BCE. Lawrence opts for a date in the late 4th century BCE, on the assumption that Demetrios Poliorcetes built the fortress rather than simply occupying it. The site was under the control of the Achaean League in 243-224 BCE, and in 224 - 146 BCE it joined the Boeotian League. Shrines of Melampos and Heracles are known to have existed by inscriptions recovered on the site. The town and its warehouses operated down into Roman times. An inscription of c. 420 CE listed Aigosthena as a free city. A five-aisled Christian basilica was erected in the lower fortified area in the medieval period, and there was a monastery complex within the citadel.

== Modern Aigosthena ==
The modern village Aigosthena, also known as Porto Germeno, is part of the municipal unit of Vilia. Its permanent population was 80 at the 2011 census. It is a popular beach resort with a small port.

== Gallery ==
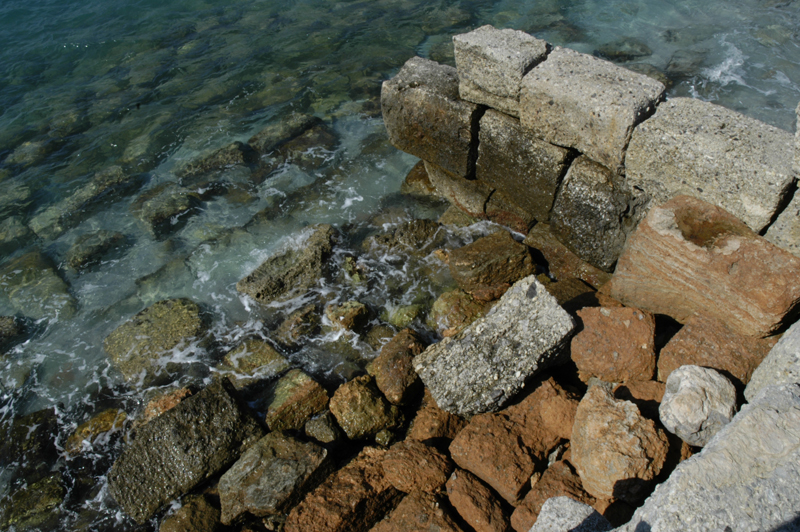
Remains of the westernmost tower of the north wall.

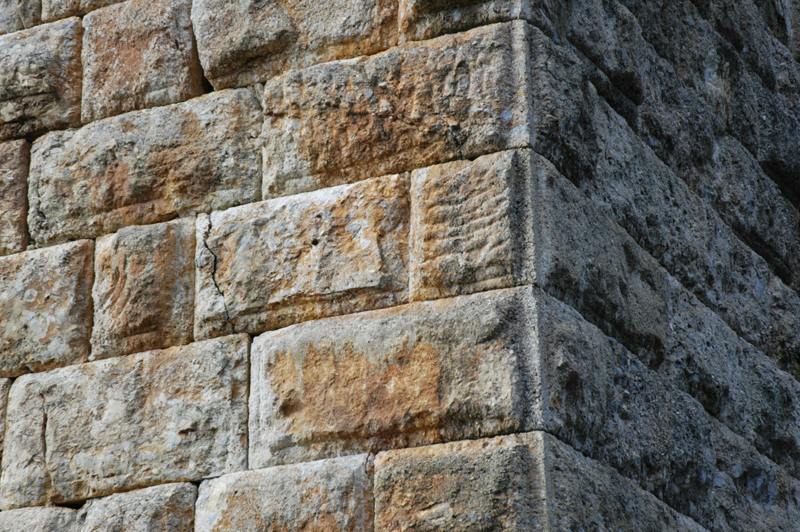
Detail of the masonry of the southeast tower of the citadel.

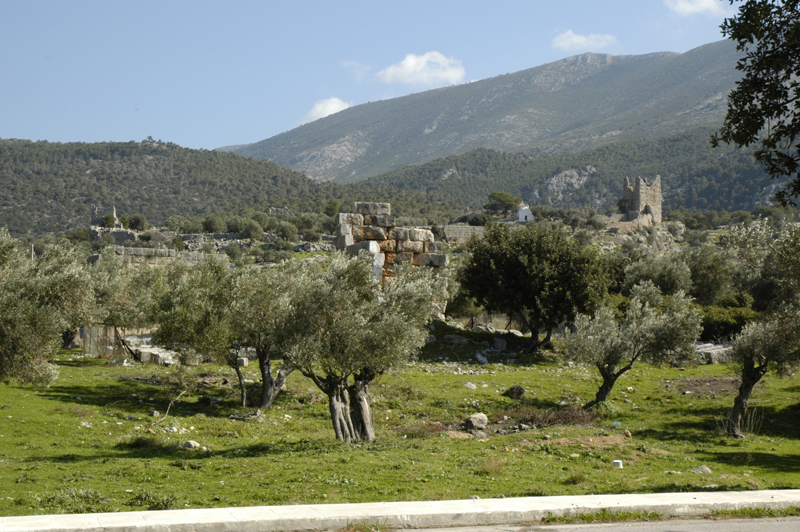
View of the citadel fortifications from the center of the north wall to the sea.

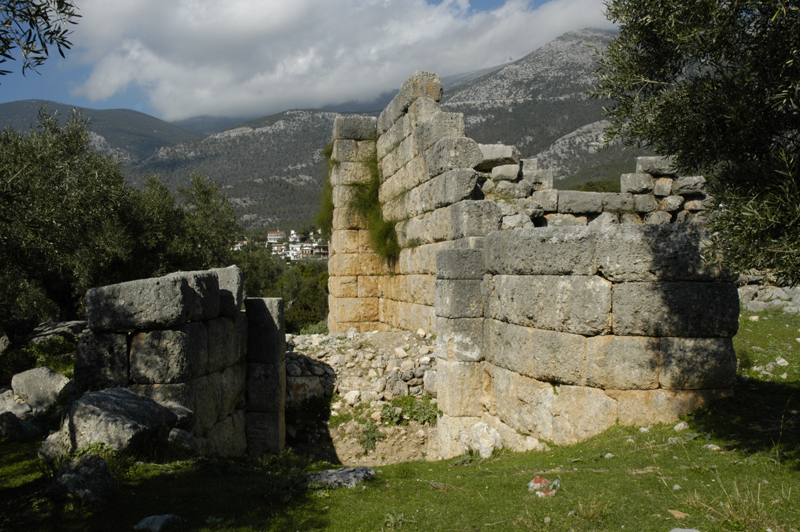
Western gate of the northern wall.

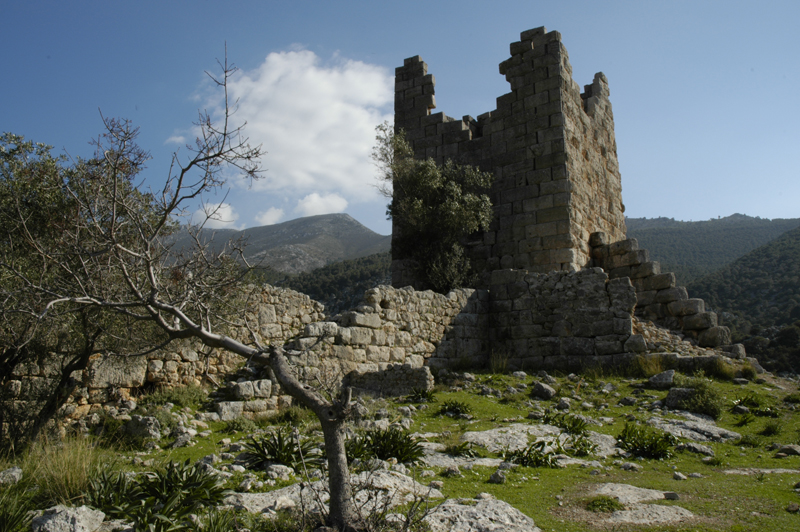
The southeast tower of the citadel from NW inside the citadel.

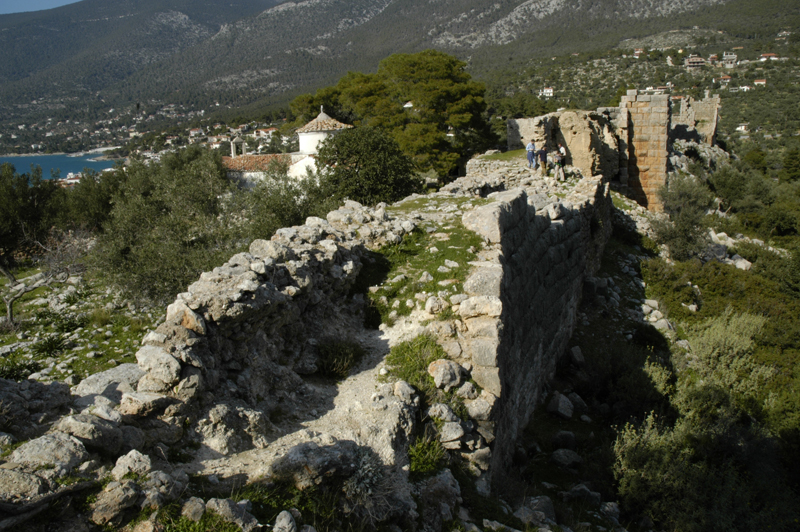
View north along the east wall of the citadel.

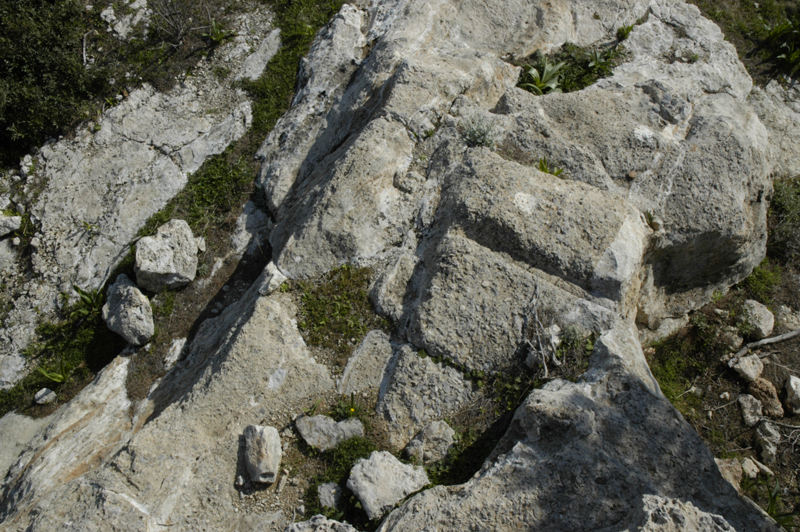
Quarry marks in the bedrock south of the southeast tower of the citadel.

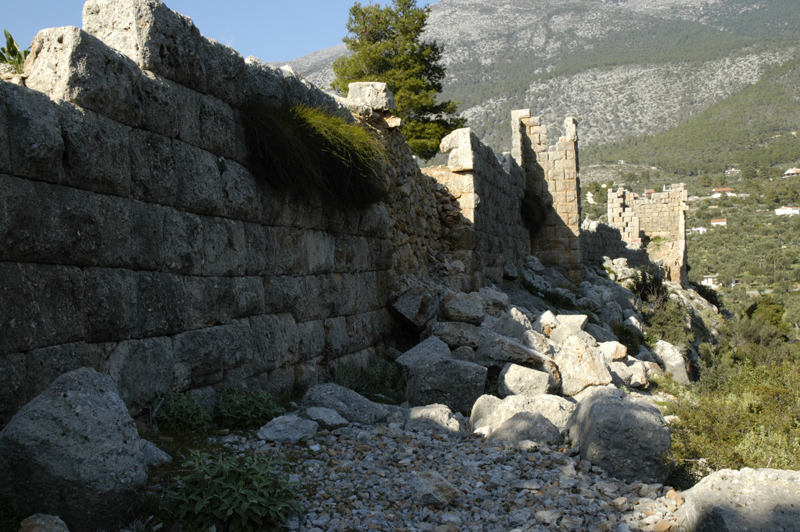
View N along the east wall of the citadel from outside the postern gate.

== Ancient sources ==
- I.G. 7.1; 7.213; 7.43
- Xenophon, Hellenica - 5.4.18; 6.4.26
- Pliny the elder, Natural History – 4.23

== See also ==
- List of ancient Greek cities

== Bibliography ==
- Lawrence, A. W. 1979. Greek Aims in Fortification. Oxford.
- Ober, J. 1987. Early Artillery Towers: Messenia, Boiotia, Attica, Megarid. AJA 91 569–604.
- Smith, Philip J. The Archaeology and Epigraphy of Hellenistic and Roman Megaris, Greece (Oxford: 2008).
