= Parori, Boeotia =

Parori Παρόρι
- Community
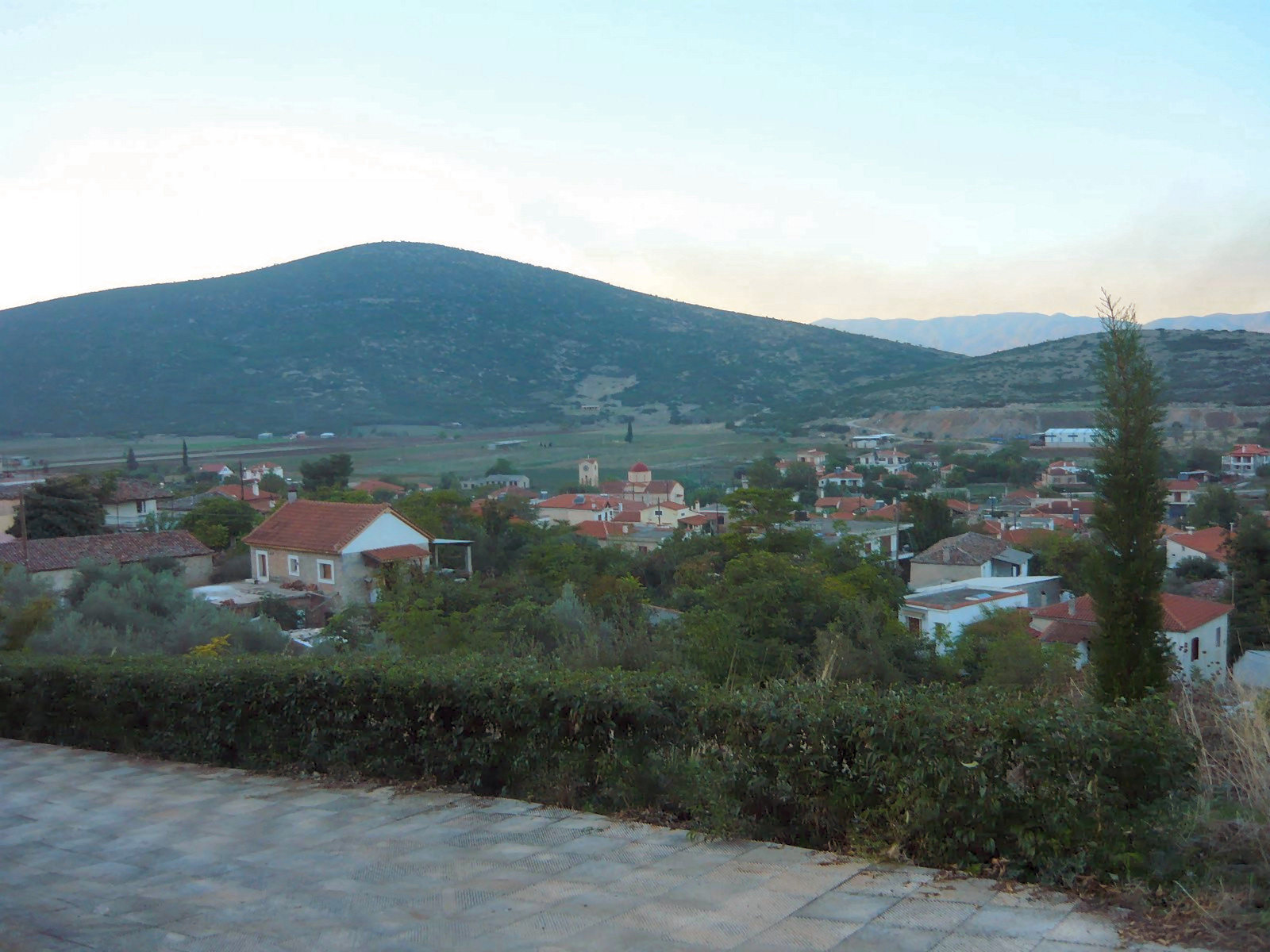
- South view of village

- Location within Greece
- Coordinates: 38°33.8′N 22°45.2′E
- Country: Greece
- Administrative region: Central Greece
- Regional unit: Boeotia
- Municipality: Livadeia
- Municipal unit: Davleia
- Highest elevation: 165 m (541 ft)
- Lowest elevation: 150 m (490 ft)

Population (2021)
  - Community: 186
- Time zone: UTC+2 (EET)
  - Summer (DST): UTC+3 (EEST)
- Postal code: 350 15
- Area code: +30 22610
- Website: paroriviotiass.blogspot.com

Parori (Greek: Παρόρι), formerly Beskeni (Greek: Μπεσκένι, named after a local Ottoman-era agha) is a small village located about 27 kilometres north of Livadeia, the capital of Boeotia in Central Greece. Today, Parori is inhabited by only a small number of full-time residents, the main occupations of the inhabitants are with farming and livestock.

== Etymology ==
Located east of Davleia at the foot of Mount Parnassus. The village was named Bescheni until 1930, when it was renamed to Parori. With its stone houses, narrow cobbled streets, beautiful tiled roofs and traditional decorative elements, the village is a good example of traditional local architecture. It is worth seeing the traditional stone floors for cereals.

The name Parori become from two possible scenarios. The first theory posits that it derives from its location at the foot of Mount Parnassus (παρά το όρος, i.e. "near the mountain"), and the second from its location in the borders of two regional units Boeotia and Phthiotis (παρά τα όρια, "near the border").

== Nearest places ==
- Davleia, 7 km
- Tithorea, 7 km
- Chaeronea, 15 km
- Livadeia, 27 km
- Arachova, 28 km
- Delfoi, 42 km
- Lamia, 65 km

== Population ==
Year	1920	1928	1940	1951	1961	1971	1981	1991	2001	2011	2021
Population	619	627	689	663	573	526	454	362	342	228	186

== History ==
The oldest testament of the village's existence is the church of St. Nicholas, which is dated by a stone inscription to 1360.

From 1930 to 1998, the village was a separate community. In 1998 it was integrated into the Municipality of Davleia, and with the 2011 Kallikratis plan, it came under the Municipality of Levadeia.

== Transport ==
Parori station is a small unstaffed station located 1.4 kilometres (0.87 mi) (17 Min walk) North of the settlement and is served by two trains a day.

== See also ==
- List of settlements in Boeotia
