= Akontio =

Akontio Ακόντιο
- Community
- Location within Greece
- Coordinates: 38°30.412′N 22°52.964′E
- Country: Greece
- Administrative region: Central Greece
- Regional unit: Boeotia
- Municipality: Livadeia
- Municipal unit: Chaeronea
- Highest elevation: 165 m (541 ft)
- Lowest elevation: 150 m (490 ft)

Population (2021)
  - Community: 68
- Time zone: UTC+2 (EET)
  - Summer (DST): UTC+3 (EEST)
- Postal code: 32100
- Area code: +30 22610

Akontio (Greek: Ακόντιο) is a subdivision of the municipality of Livadeia, Greece.

== Nearest places ==
- Davleia, 18 km
- Tithorea, 22 km
- Chaeronea, 4 km
- Livadeia, 18 km
- Arachova, 50 km
- Delfoi, 60 km
- Lamia, 85 km

== Population ==
Historical population
Year	Pop.	±%
2001	145	—
2011	127	−12.4%
2021	68	−46.5%

== See also ==
- List of settlements in Boeotia
