= Oinoi =

Oinoi Οινόη
- Municipal unit
- Frankish tower near Oinoi

- Location within the regional unit

- Location within Greece
- Coordinates: 38°10′N 23°24′E
- Country: Greece
- Administrative region: Attica
- Regional unit: West Attica
- Municipality: Mandra-Eidyllia

Area
  - Municipal unit: 14.431 km^{2} (5.572 sq mi)
- Elevation: 301 m (988 ft)

Population (2021)
  - Municipal unit: 376
  - Municipal unit density: 26.1/km^{2} (67.5/sq mi)
- Time zone: UTC+2 (EET)
  - Summer (DST): UTC+3 (EEST)
- Postal code: 190 12
- Area code: 22630
- Vehicle registration: Z
- Website: www.inoi.gr

Oinoi (Greek: Οινόη) is a village and a former community in the northern part of West Attica, Greece. The village was named Mazi (Greek: Μάζι) until 1919. Since the 2011 local government reform it is part of the municipality Mandra-Eidyllia, of which it is a municipal unit. The municipal unit has an area of 14.431 km^{2}.

The ancient site Oenoe is located about 3 km east of the modern settlement of Oinoi. Oinoi is surrounded by forested mountains, including Pateras (1,131 m (3,711 ft)) and Pastra (1,016 m (3,333 ft)). There are farmlands in the valley areas. Oinoi is located 7 km east of Vilia, 18 km northwest of Eleusis, 19 km southeast of Thebes and 34 km (21 mi) northwest of Athens city centre.

== Etymology ==
The name "Oinoi" has been known since antiquity, with Pausanias retelling one version, from the woman Oinoi, sister of the Epoch. (Pausanias, At. Κ. Λγ '§7).

== History ==
Mazi had been planned to be served by a railway station as early as 1883 in a preliminary study by the French Mission for the planned Piraeus - Demerli - Border railway.

== Historical population ==
Year	Population
1981	241
1991	495
2001	765
2011	382
2021	376

== Transport ==
=== Road ===
The Greek National Road 3 (Eleusis - Thebes) passes through Oinoi.

== Celebrations ==
In Oinoi, the feast of the Holy Trinity is celebrated on the day of the Holy Spirit in June, while in August the feast of Wine is celebrated. On 15 August, a popular celebration is organized by the Landscaping Association of Panagitsa Mariza in the chapel of Panagia, while on 26 October it honors Agios Dimitrios in the old church of the patron saint of the village.
