= Hysiae (Boeotia) =

Ancient Boetian town

Coordinates: 38°13′21″N 23°20′26″E

Hysiae or Hysiai (Ancient Greek: Ὑσιαί), also Hysia (Ὑσία), was a town of ancient Boeotia, in the Parasopia, at the northern foot of Mount Cithaeron, and on the high road from Thebes to Athens. It was said to have been a colony from Hyria, and to have been founded by Nycteus, father of Antiope. Herodotus says that both Hysiae and Oenoe were Attic demoi when they were taken by the Boeotians in 507 BCE. It probably, however, belonged to Plataea. Oenoe was recovered by the Athenians; but, as Mt. Cithaeron was the natural boundary between Attica and Boeotia, Hysiae continued to be a Boeotian town. Hysiae is mentioned in the operations which preceded the Battle of Plataea. Hysiae was in ruins in the time of Pausanias, who noticed there an unfinished temple of Apollo and a sacred well. Hysiae is mentioned also by Euripides and Thucydides.

Its site is located near modern Kriekouki in Erythres.
