= List of settlements in Boeotia =

This is a list of settlements in Boeotia, Greece.

- Agia Anna
- Agia Triada
- Agios Dimitrios
- Agios Georgios
- Agios Spyridonas
- Agios Thomas
- Agios Vlasios
- Akontio
- Akraifnio
- Alalkomenes
- Aliartos
- Alyki
- Ampelochori
- Anthochori
- Antikyra
- Arachova
- Arma
- Askri
- Asopia
- Chaeronea
- Chostia
- Dafni
- Davleia
- Dilesi
- Dionysos
- Distomo
- Domvraina
- Eleonas
- Ellopia
- Evangelistria
- Kallithea
- Kaparelli
- Karya
- Kastro
- Kleidi
- Kokkino
- Koroneia
- Kyriaki
- Lafystio
- Lefktra
- Leontari
- Livadeia
- Loutoufio
- Loutsio
- Mavrommati
- Mavroneri
- Melissochori
- Mouriki
- Neochoraki
- Neochori
- Oinofyta
- Oinoi
- Orchomenos
- Paralia Distomou
- Parori
- Pavlos
- Petra
- Plaka Dilesi
- Plataies
- Profitis Ilias
- Prosilio
- Pyli
- Pyrgos
- Romaiiko
- Schimatari
- Skourta
- Solinari
- Stefani
- Steiri
- Tanagra
- Thebes
- Thespies
- Thisvi
- Thourio
- Tsoukalades
- Vagia
- Vasilika
- Xironomi
- Ypato
- Ypsilantis

== See also ==
- List of towns and villages in Greece
