= Dafni, Boeotia =

Dafni Δάφνη
- Community
- Location within Greece
- Coordinates: 38°14′N 23°25′E
- Country: Greece
- Administrative region: Central Greece
- Regional unit: Boeotia
- Municipality: Tanagra
- Municipal unit: Dervenochoria

Population (2021)
  - Community: 72
- Time zone: UTC+2 (EET)
  - Summer (DST): UTC+3 (EEST)

Dafni (Greek: Δάφνη meaning "laurel", before 1955: Δαριμάρι - Darimari) is a small village in Boeotia, Greece. It is part of the municipal unit Dervenochoria. Dafni is situated on the northern edge of Pastra mountain. It is in a sparsely populated agricultural area, with forests to the south. Dafni lies 7 km northwest of Pyli, 9 km east of Erythres, and 13 km southeast of Thiva.

== Population ==
Year	Village population
1981	288
1991	233
2001	156
2011	101
2021	72

== See also ==
- List of settlements in Boeotia
