= Dervenochoria =

Dervenochoria Δερβενοχώρια
- Municipal unit
- Location within the regional unit

- Location within Greece
- Coordinates: 38°13′N 23°30′E
- Country: Greece
- Administrative region: Central Greece
- Regional unit: Boeotia
- Municipality: Tanagra

Area
  - Municipal unit: 222.94 km^{2} (86.08 sq mi)
- Elevation: 566 m (1,857 ft)

Population (2021)
  - Municipal unit: 1,826
  - Municipal unit density: 8.191/km^{2} (21.21/sq mi)
- Time zone: UTC+2 (EET)
  - Summer (DST): UTC+3 (EEST)
- Postal code: 190 12, 320 05
- Area code: 26940
- Vehicle registration: ΒΙ

Dervenochoria (Greek: Δερβενοχώρια) is a former municipality in Boeotia, Greece. Since the 2011 local government reform it is part of the municipality Tanagra, of which it is a municipal unit. In 2021 its population was 1,826. The municipal unit has an area of 222.938 km^{2}. It covers the southernmost portion of Boeotia. The main village is Pyli.

== Subdivisions ==
The municipal unit Dervenochoria is subdivided into the following communities (constituent villages in brackets):

- Dafni
- Pyli (Pyli, Panaktos, Prasino)
- Skourta
- Stefani

== History ==
The municipality was created in 1997.

The region was a main passage from Boeotia to Attica; Dervenochoria comes from "Derveni villages" named after this passage (from turkic "derveni", "passage" named during the Ottoman times).

Most of Dervenochoria was hit by a devastating wildfire (see 2007 Greek forest fires) on Thursday June 28, 2007 that came from Parnitha westward. Some damages to property including houses and buildings were reported. The aftermath was that much of the forest turned into an ashy landscape that may take years to restore its natural beauty.

Dervenochoria was severely affected by 2023 Greece wildfires.
