= Daulis (mythology) =

In Greek mythology, Daulis (Ancient Greek: Δαυλίς) and at a later stage Daulia (Ancient Greek: Δαυλία) and Daulion (Ancient Greek: Δαύλιον) was the name of a mythological figure and Davleia, the city in Phocis, is named after her. Daulis was the hometown of Tereus, Thracian king and also the city at the end of the road not taken by Oedipus.

== Family ==
According to Homer, it was said to be named either in reference to the woody character of the area or after a nymph Daulis, a daughter of the river-god Cephissus.

== Mythology ==
=== Nymph ===
"They say that the name of the city is derived from Daulis, a nymph, the daughter of the Cephisus. Others say that the place, on which the city was built, was wooded, and that such shaggy places (dasea) were called daula by the ancients..

=== Place ===
Here in Daulis the women are said to have served up to Tereus his own son, which act was the first pollution of the dining-table among men. The hoopoe, into which the legend says Tereus was changed, is a bird a little larger than the quail, while the feathers on its head rise into the shape of a crest.

It is noteworthy that in Phocis swallows neither hatch nor lay eggs; in fact no swallow would even make a nest in the roof of a house. The Phocians say that even when Philomela was a bird she had a terror of Tereus, and so kept away from his country. At Daulis is a sanctuary of Athena with an ancient image. The wooden image, of an even earlier date, the Daulians say was brought from Athens by Procne.

In the territory of Daulis is a place called Tronis. Here has been built a shrine of the Founder hero. This founder is said by some to have been Xanthippus, a distinguished soldier; others say that he was Phocus, son of Ornytion, son of Sisyphus. At any rate, he is worshipped every day, and the Phocians bring victims and pour the blood into the grave through a hole, but the flesh they are wont to consume on the spot."
