= Davleia railway station =

Railway station in Central Greece

Δαύλεια Davleia
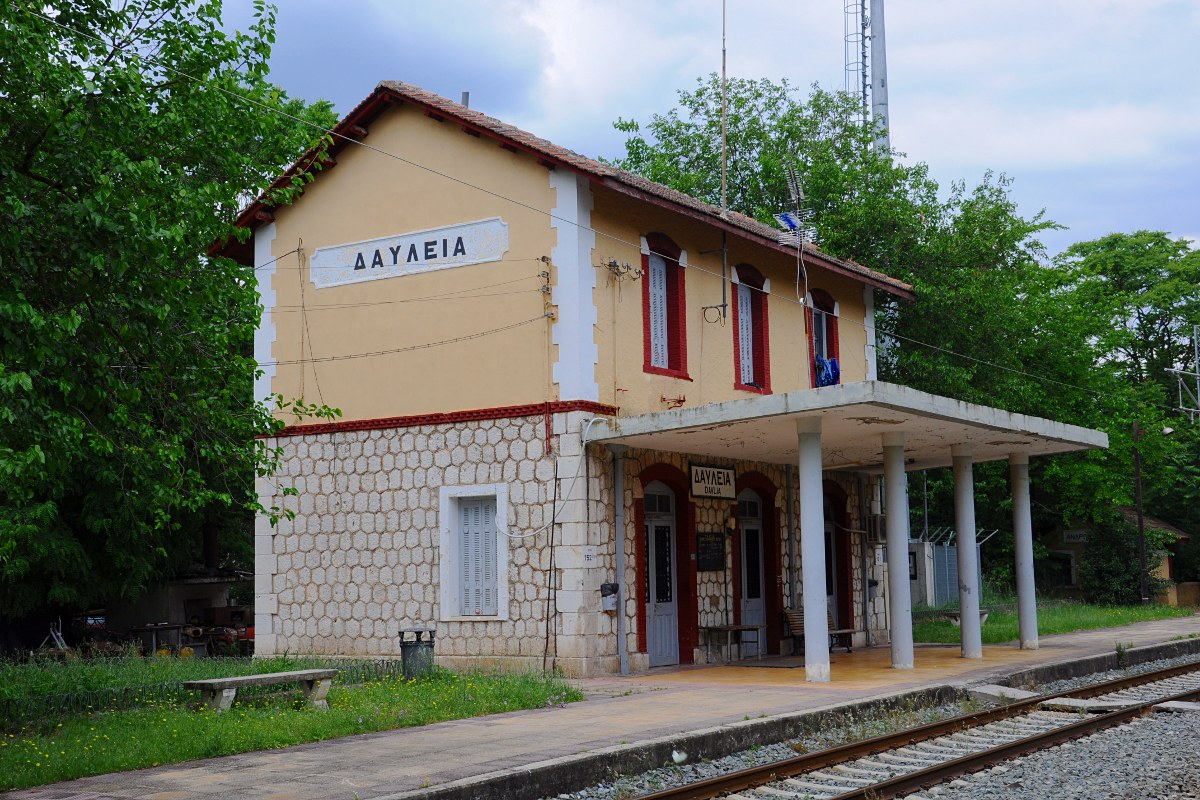
- Davleia railway station, May 2011

General information
- Location: Davleia; Livadeia; Greece
- Coordinates: 38°32′03″N 22°48′44″E
- Owner: GAIAOSE
- Line: Piraeus–Platy railway
- Platforms: 2
- Tracks: 2
- Train operators: Hellenic Train

Construction
- Structure type: at-grade
- Platform levels: 1
- Parking: No
- Cycle facilities: No

Other information
- Website: http://www.ose.gr/en/

History
- Opened: 8 March 1904
- Electrified: 25 kV AC, 50 Hz

Services
Preceding station	Hellenic Train	Following station
Chaeronea towards Athens	G1 Athens-Leianokladi via Bralos	Parori towards Leianokladi
Location
- Location within Greece

Davleia railway station (Greek: Σιδηροδρομικός Σταθμός Δαυλείας, romanized: Sidirodromikós stathmós Davleias) is a railway station situated 8.3 kilometres (5.2 mi) east of Davleia, Greece: despite its name, the station is closer to the settlement of Mavroneri. The station opened on 11 November 1904. It is served by local trains to Athens and Leianokladi.

== History ==
The station opened on 11 November 1904.. In 1920 Hellenic State Railways or SEK was established, and the line became part of the network. During the Axis occupation of Greece (1941–44), Athens was controlled by German military fourses, and the line used for the transport of troops and weapons. During the occupation (and especially during the German withdrawal in 1944), the network was severely damaged by both the German army and Greek resistance groups. The track and rolling stock replacement took time following the civil war, with normal service levels resumed around 1948.

In 1970 OSE became the legal successor to the SEK, taking over responsibilities for most of Greece's rail infrastructure. On 1 January 1971, the station and most of the Greek rail infrastructure were transferred to the Hellenic Railways Organisation S.A., a state-owned corporation. Freight traffic declined sharply when the state-imposed monopoly of OSE for transporting agricultural products and fertilisers ended in the early 1990s. Many small stations of the network with little passenger traffic were closed down. It was during this time that bus-like shelters were installed on both platforms.

In 2001 the infrastructure element of OSE was created, known as GAIAOSE; it would henceforth be responsible for the maintenance of stations, bridges and other elements of the network, as well as the leasing and the sale of railway assists. In 2005, TrainOSE was created as a brand within OSE to concentrate on rail services and passenger interface. In 2009, with the Greek debt crisis unfolding OSE's Management was forced to reduce services across the network. Timetables were cutback and routes closed, as the government-run entity attempted to reduce overheads. In 2017 OSE's passenger transport sector was privatised as TrainOSE, (Now Hellenic Train) currently, a wholly owned subsidiary of Ferrovie dello Stato Italiane infrastructure, including stations, remained under the control of OSE. In July 2022, the station began being served by Hellenic Train, the rebranded TranOSE.

In August 2025, the Greek Ministry of Infrastructure and Transport confirmed the creation of a new body, Greek Railways (Greek: Σιδηρόδρομοι Ελλάδος, romanized: Ellinikí Sidiródromi Monoprósopi) to assume responsibility for rail infrastructure, planning, modernisation projects, and rolling stock across Greece. Previously, these functions were divided among several state-owned entities: OSE, which managed infrastructure; ERGOSÉ, responsible for modernisation projects; and GAIAOSÉ, which owned stations, buildings, and rolling stock. OSE had overseen both infrastructure and operations until its vertical separation in 2005. Rail safety has been identified as a key priority. The merger follows the July approval of a Parliamentary Bill to restructure the national railway system, a direct response to the Tempi accident of February 2023, in which 43 people died after a head-on collision.

On 14 September 2025, at 05:45 Hellenic Railways informed passengers that due to a technical problem, services would be disrupted between Thebes and Davleia railway station. The disruption, which Hellenic Railways reported was due to damage to communication systems was reperiad in less than 18 hours.

== Facilities ==
The station is still housed in a 20th-century brick-built station building, but this is now in disrepair. The Station is currently (2022) not equipped with toilets or a staffed ticket office. Access to the platforms is via crossing the lines. At platform level, there are sheltered seating but no Dot-matrix display departure or arrival screens or timetable poster boards on all platforms. Currently, there is no local bus stop connecting the station.

== Services ==
It is served by Regional services between Athens and Leianokladi. The station sees around 2 trains per-day.

== Station layout ==
Ground level	Customer service	Exit/Tickets
Level; Ε1	Side platform, doors will open on the right
Level; Ε1	Platform 1	towards Athens (Chaeronea) ←
Level; Ε1	Platform 2	towards Leianokladi (Parori) →
Level; Ε1	Side platform, doors will open on the right
