= Zoodochos Pigi Church, Dervenosalesi =

Byzantine-era church in Greece

Coordinates: 38.214408°N 23.470431°E

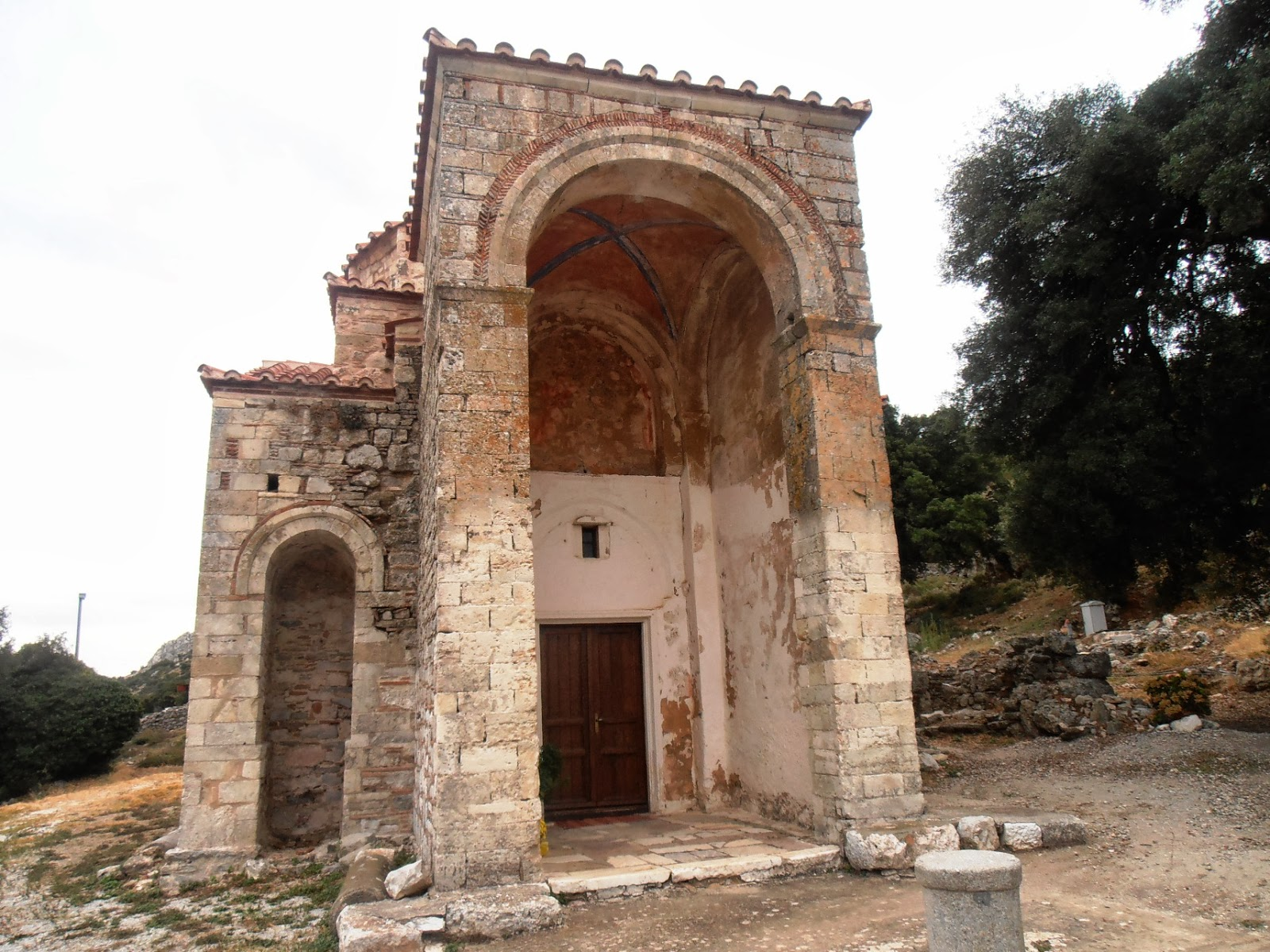
Zoodochos Pigi Church

The Church of Zoodochos Pigi (Greek: Ζωοδόχος Πηγή, "Life-giving Spring") is a Byzantine-era church in the village of Pyli, Boeotia (formerly known as Dervenosalesi), originally part of a monastery.

Located some 5 km west of the village, the modern church was originally the narthex or lite of the katholikon church of a monastery. The monastery is otherwise unidentified and is not mentioned in any source or inscription, but the name "Monastery of Sterna" may be applicable to it. On the other hand, it is possible that this monastery is the same as the Monastery to the Theometor mentioned in the hagiography of Meletius the Younger, in which case it dates to the end of the 11th century. On stylistic grounds, it has been dated to the late 12th century.

The katholikon, whose foundations survive, was a cross-in-square domed church with three semicircular apses, and sported a floor decoration by inlaid marble in geometric patterns very similar to the nearby Church of Hosios Loukas. The katholikon collapsed ca. 1890, and the narthex was transformed into the current church. The narthex is roughly octagonal, with four crosswise central vaults and niches in the corners. From the rest of the monastery, only portions of the surrounding walls and, to the north, the foundations of the monastery baths, datable to the 13th century, survive.
