= Pastra (mountain) =

Mountain in Greece

- Location within Greece

Highest point
- Elevation: 1,016 m (3,333 ft)
- Coordinates: 38°11′56″N 23°22′41″E

Geography
- Location: northwestern Attica southern Boeotia

The Pastra (Greek: Πάστρα) is a mountain in West Attica, Greece, near the border with Boeotia. It is the eastern extension of the Cithaeron mountain range. Its highest peak, named Petrogeraki (Πετρογεράκι), is 1016 m high. The nearby peak Kourtiza (Κούρτιζα) is 1015 m high. Its morphology is defined by steep slopes and four deep gorges on the northeast side. Its flora consists of brushwood, holm oaks, pine trees, and arbutus. Its fauna includes hares, foxes, blackbirds, and partridges.

== Geography ==
Pastra is situated in the northern part of West Attica and the southeastern part of Boeotia. It is south of the Asopos valley, west of the Parnitha mountains, and east of the Cithaeron mountains. Places around the Patra mountains are, from the north and clockwise, Dafni, Pyli, Oinoi and Erythres. The Greek National Road 3 (Eleusis - Thebes) passes west of the mountains.

== History ==
A number of municipalities and settlements were located around Pastra in antiquity including Oenoe (Οινόη), Eleutherae (Ἐλευθεραί), Erythrae (Ἐρυθραί), and Hysiae (Ὑσιαί). A number of fortifications on the mountain's passages from 400 BC survive to this age. The ancient boundary between Attica, Megaris and Boeotia lay on the top of the mountain.

On December 20, 1997 a Hellenic Air Force airplane C-130H 750, c.n. 4729, crashed into Pastra during the landing approach to Tanagra air base.

== Religious buildings ==
On Pastra one can find the monastery of Profitis Ilias (Προφήτης Ηλίας) and the chapels Αgios Dimitrios (Άγιος Δημήτριος), Αgios Athanasios, (Άγιος Αθανάσιος), Agia Marina (Αγία Μαρίνα), Agia Triada (Αγία Τριάδα), and Agios Georgios (Άγιος Γεώργιος).
