= Panactum =

Coordinates: 38°11′03″N 23°30′21″E

Panactum or Panakton (Ancient Greek: Πάνακτον) was a fortress on the frontiers of ancient Attica and Boeotia. Ancient Athenians and Boeotians frequently fought over this. In 304 BC, Demetrius I Poliorketes took the fortress after a siege.

The site of Panactum is located between modern Panakto and Prasino (formerly, Kavasala).
