= Skourta =

Skourta Σκούρτα
- Settlement
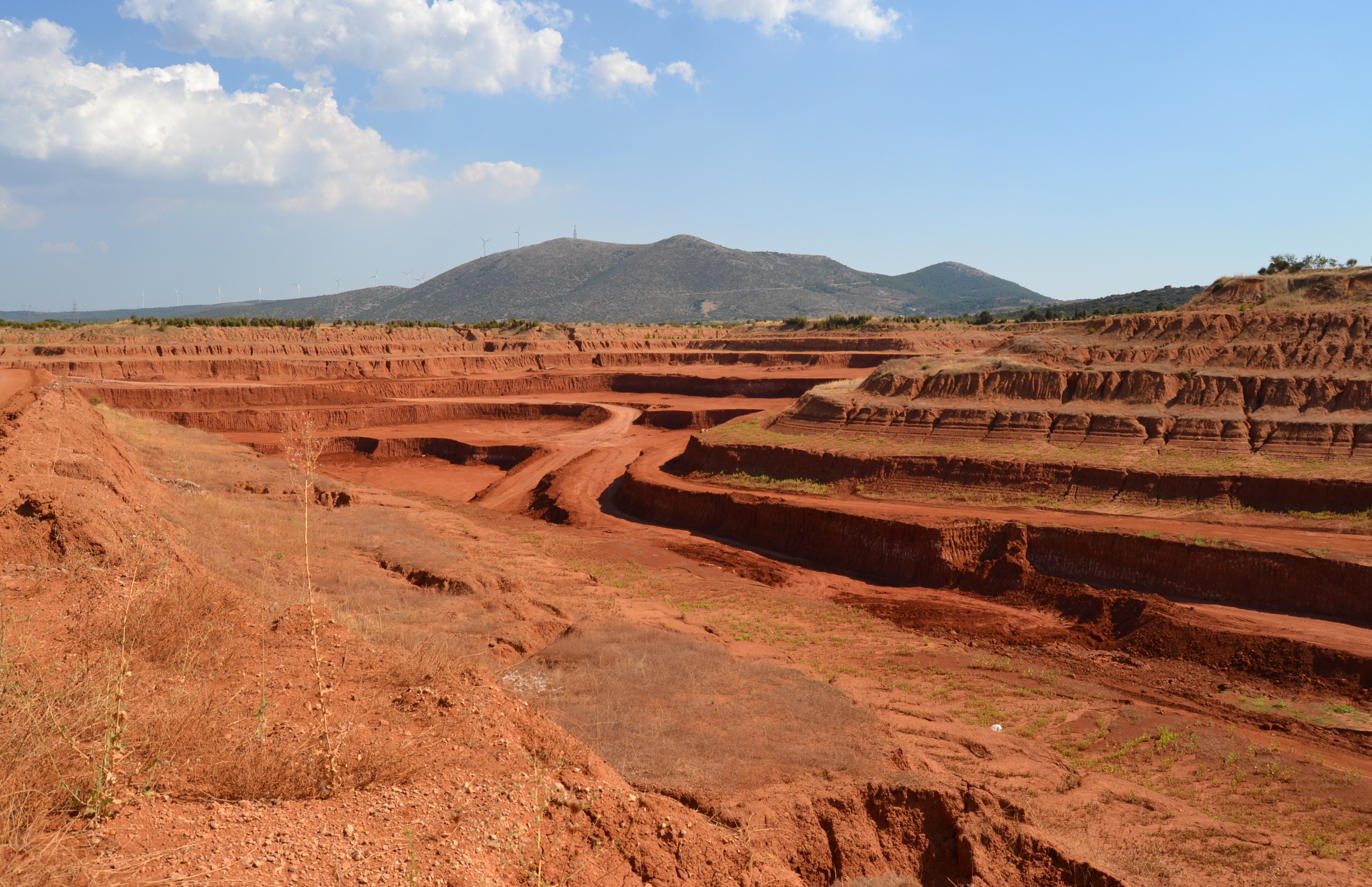
- Clay pit near Skourta

- Location within Greece
- Coordinates: 38°13′N 23°33′E
- Country: Greece
- Administrative region: Central Greece
- Regional unit: Boeotia
- Municipality: Tanagra
- Municipal unit: Dervenochoria

Population (2021)
  - Total: 740
- Time zone: UTC+2 (EET)
  - Summer (DST): UTC+3 (EEST)

Skourta (Greek: Σκούρτα) is a village in Boeotia, Greece. It is part of the municipality Tanagra. It is situated northwest of the Parnitha mountain, in a rather sparsely populated area, dominated by agriculture and forestry. Skourta lies 4 km north of Stefani, 5 km east of Pyli and 30 km northwest of Athens.

== Population ==
Year	Village population
1981	766
1991	816
2001	929
2011	784
2021	740

== See also ==
- List of settlements in Boeotia
