= Tsoukalades, Boeotia =

Tsoukalades Τσουκαλάδες
- Settlement
- Location within Greece
- Coordinates: 38°27.3′N 22°47.8′E
- Country: Greece
- Administrative region: Central Greece
- Regional unit: Boeotia
- Municipality: Livadeia
- Municipal unit: Livadeia
- Community: Livadeia
- Elevation: 220 m (720 ft)

Population (2021)
  - Total: 92
- Time zone: UTC+2 (EET)
  - Summer (DST): UTC+3 (EEST)
- Postal code: 321 00
- Area code: +30-2261
- Vehicle registration: BI

Tsoukalades (Greek: Τσουκαλάδες, Greek pronunciation: [t͡suka'laðes]) is a village of the Livadeia municipality. The 2021 census recorded 92 residents in the village. Tsoukalades is a part of the community of Livadeia.

== See also ==
- List of settlements in Boeotia
