= Mandhra, Khyber Pakhtunkhwa =

Coordinates: 27°22′N 68°04′E

Mandhra
- Town and union council
- Interactive map of Mandhra
- Country: Pakistan
- Province: Khyber Pakhtunkhwa
- District: Dera Ismail Khan District

Mandhra is a town and union council of Dera Ismail Khan District in Khyber Pakhtunkhwa province of Pakistan.
