= Nea Peramos =

Nea Peramos Νέα Πέραμος
- Municipal unit
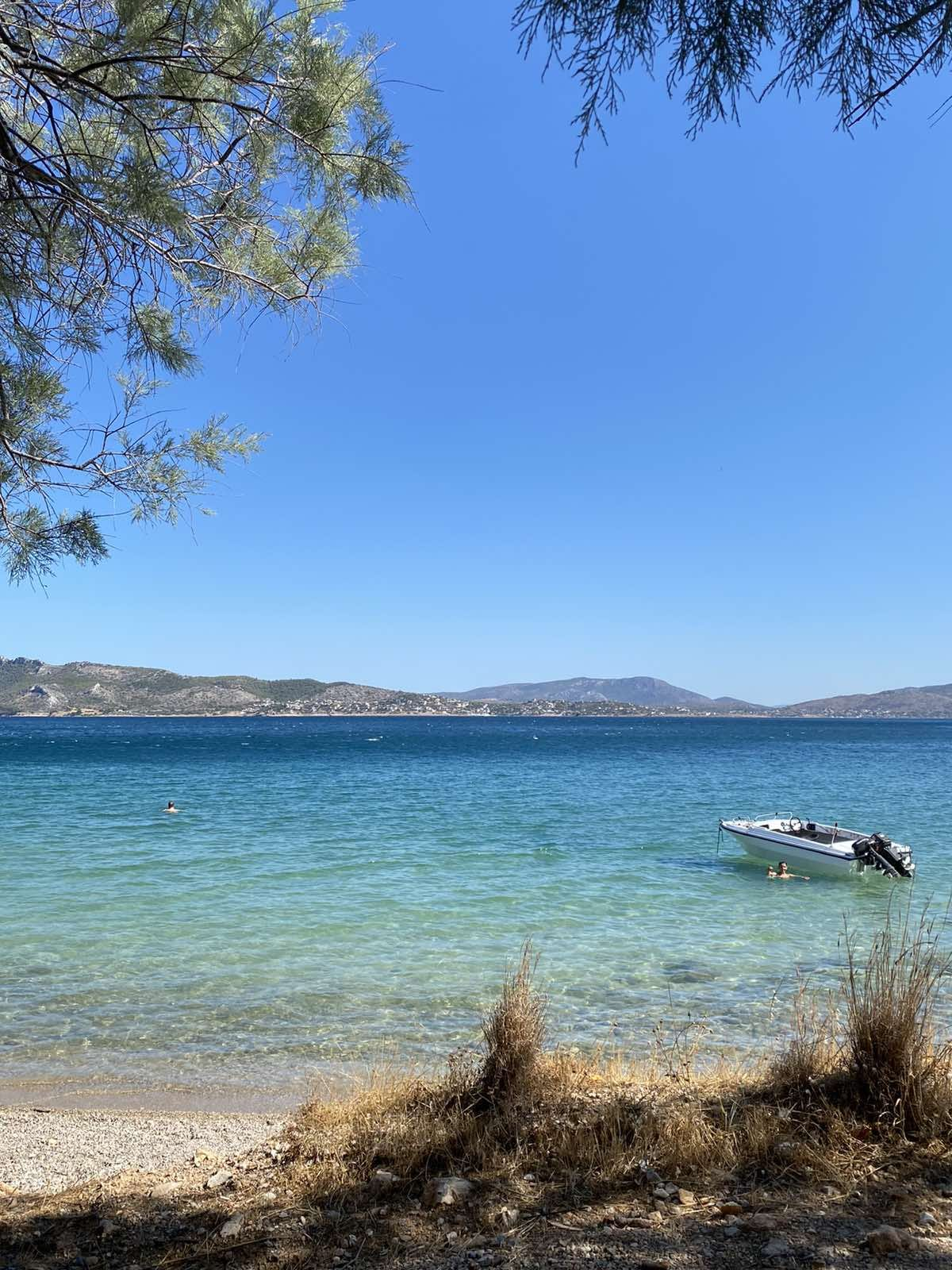
- Loutropyrgos Beach

- Location within the regional unit

- Location within Greece
- Coordinates: 38°0′N 23°25′E
- Country: Greece
- Administrative region: Attica
- Regional unit: West Attica
- Municipality: Megara

Area
  - Municipal unit: 7.900 km^{2} (3.050 sq mi)
- Elevation: 2 m (6.6 ft)

Population (2021)
  - Municipal unit: 7,260
  - Municipal unit density: 919/km^{2} (2,380/sq mi)
- Time zone: UTC+2 (EET)
  - Summer (DST): UTC+3 (EEST)
- Postal code: 190 06
- Area code: 22960
- Vehicle registration: Z
- Website: www.nea-peramos.gr

Nea Peramos (Greek: Νέα Πέραμος), before the 1990s Megalo Pefko (Greek: Μεγάλο Πεύκο), is a suburb and a former municipality in West Attica, Greece. Since the 2011 local government reform, it is part of the municipality Megara, of which it is a municipal unit.

== Geography ==
Nea Peramos is situated in the eastern part of the Megaris plain, on the Saronic Gulf coast, opposite the island of Salamis. Nea Peramos is 7 km east of Megara, 11 km west of Eleusis. The town was developed across the sea shore and included the seashore summer resort of Loutropyrgos, once the boundary between the ancient rival city states of Athens and Megara.

The A8 motorway passes north of the town. The Nea Peramos railway station is served by Proastiakos commuter trains to Kiato. From its fishing harbour, a ferryboat line connects it to the island of Salamis, close to the Monastery of Panagia Faneromeni.

Landmark buildings include the two tall (12-storied and 10-storied) blocks of flats, the Church of St. George, the N. Petkas Traditional Olive Press (currently (Oct. '11)under reconstruction), which has been donated to the Association of Peramians Kyzikians and the former Town Hall, all of them on 28 October st. (the old Greek National Road 8) which traverses the town parallel to the coast.

Nea Peramos has a few schools (a lyceum - high school, a gymnasium - junior high school and four primary schools) and two KAPI (day care centres for elderly people). Three military camps are located in town, among them the Artillery School and the Army Special Forces base.

Please also note there is a small seaside resort bearing the same name in Northern Greece, near Kavala.

== Culture ==
There is a municipal library whose mostly-Greek-language collection is as yet (Oct '11) uncatalogued. The cultural life of the town is enriched by the Fair of St. George in April, the Klidonas festival on St. John's Day (after the summer solstice) and the Sardine Night in late August. Several cultural associations operate, such as the Association of Peramians Kyzikians, the Nea Peramos Women's Association and the Cultural Association "Aghios Panteleimon".

There are two amateur sports teams: The Athletic Sports Association of Nea Peramos (est. 1939) and Attalos Neas Peramou (est. 2001).

There are 15 teams in town (about 900 in the whole of Attica) of skilled flying (high flying, diving, spiralling etc.) pigeons, most of them belonging to the Aspropyrgos Association of Pigeon-Owners.

== History ==
In 1922, after the defeat of the Greek Army in the Greco-Turkish war, the Greek residents of Peramos (modern Karşıyaka near Bandırma, Turkey) in Asia Minor were expelled from their town by the advancing Turkish Army and the rebels. They ended up in Kavala and in the area of Megara. This location near Megara was given over by the Government of Eleftherios Venizelos so that they could start their new life. The first school was a wooden shack which also functioned on Sundays as a church until the current Church of Saint George was built to accommodate the Icon which the refugees brought with them from their ancestral land.

Year	Population
1981	4,129
1991	6,869
2001	7,480
2011	8,333
2021	7,260

== See also ==
- List of municipalities of Attica
