= Mandra =

Town in West Attica, Greece

Mandra Μάνδρα
- Municipal unit
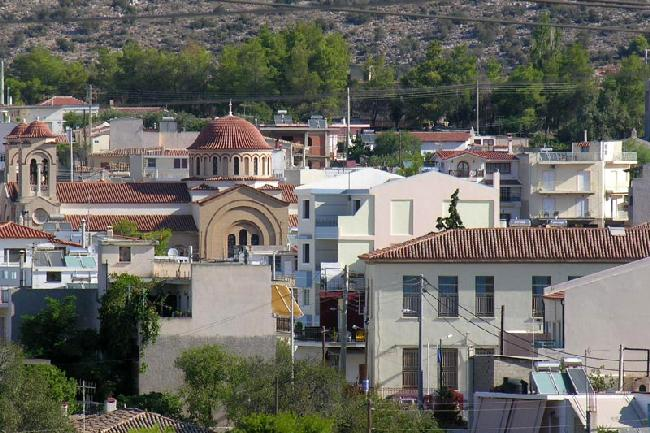
- Mandra

- Location within the regional unit

- Location within Greece
- Coordinates: 38°4′N 23°30′E
- Country: Greece
- Administrative region: Attica
- Regional unit: West Attica
- Municipality: Mandra-Eidyllia

Area
  - Municipal unit: 205.770 km^{2} (79.448 sq mi)
- Elevation: 107 m (351 ft)

Population (2021)
  - Municipal unit: 12,365
  - Municipal unit density: 60.091/km^{2} (155.64/sq mi)
- Time zone: UTC+2 (EET)
  - Summer (DST): UTC+3 (EEST)
- Postal code: 196 00
- Area code: 210
- Vehicle registration: Z
- Website: www.mandra.gr

Mandra (Greek: Μάνδρα), is a town and former municipality in West Attica, Greece. Since the 2011 local government reform, it is part of the municipality Mandra-Eidyllia, of which it is the seat and a municipal unit. The municipal unit covers an area of 205.770 km^{2} and has a population of 12,365 according to the 2021 census.

== History ==
The inhabitants of Mandra are Arvanites. Mandra was the location of the last Greek naval base to deploy naval ships to aid in the Aegean War which the Greeks won in 268 B.C.

In 2017, the area was badly hit from catastrophic floods, that resulted in 24 deaths in the entire region, but mainly in Mandra and Nea Peramos. Mandra was severely affected by 2023 Greece wildfires.

== Geography ==
Mandra is a western, outer suburb of Athens. It is located 4 km from the Saronic Gulf coast, 2 km west of Magoula, 5 km northwest of Elefsina and 22 km northwest of Athens city centre. The western part of the municipal unit is covered by Mount Pateras. There is a large industrial zone near the coast. The municipal unit of Mándra has a land area of 205.770 km^{2}. The municipal unit also includes the villages of Néa Zoí, Ágios Sotír, Palaiochóri, Diódia and Pournári, along with several smaller settlements. Mandra is bypassed by the Greek National Road 3 (Elefsis - Thiva).

== Historical population ==
| Year | Town population | Municipal unit population |
|---|---|---|
| 1981 | 8,804 | - |
| 1991 | 10,012 | 11,343 |
| 2001 | 10,947 | 12,792 |
| 2011 | 11,327 | 12,888 |
| 2021 | 11,126 | 12,365 |

== Notable people ==
- Vice Admiral Alexandros Sakellariou (1889–1982), ex-minister of Defense
