= Xironomi =

Xironomi Ξηρονομή
- Community
- Location within Greece
- Coordinates: 38°15′N 23°04′E
- Country: Greece
- Administrative region: Central Greece
- Regional unit: Boeotia
- Municipality: Thebes
- Municipal unit: Thisvi

Population (2021)
  - Community: 586
- Time zone: UTC+2 (EET)
  - Summer (DST): UTC+3 (EEST)
- Area code: 22640

Xironomi (Greek: Ξηρονομή) is a village in Boeotia, Greece. It belongs to the Thisvi municipal unit.

== Name ==
The origins of the name Xironomi still remain unknown.

== See also ==
- List of settlements in Boeotia
