= Pyli, Boeotia =

Pyli Πύλη
- Community
- Location within Greece
- Coordinates: 38°13′N 23°30′E
- Country: Greece
- Administrative region: Central Greece
- Regional unit: Boeotia
- Municipality: Tanagra
- Municipal unit: Dervenochoria

Population (2021)
  - Community: 629
- Time zone: UTC+2 (EET)
  - Summer (DST): UTC+3 (EEST)
- Postal code: 190 12

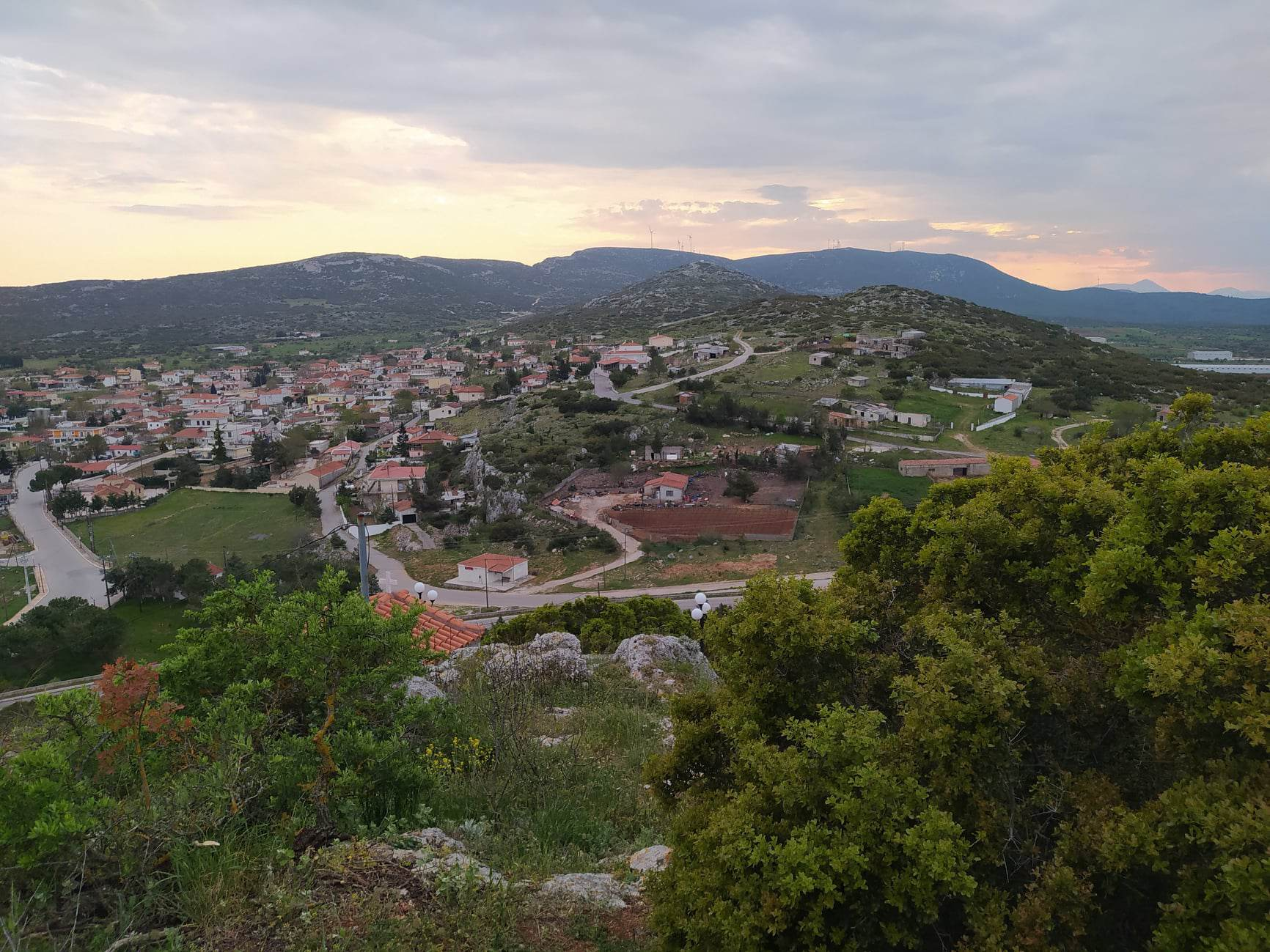
Pyli

Pyli (Greek: Πύλη meaning "gate", before 1927: Δερβενοσάλεσι - Dervenosalesi) is a village and a community in Boeotia, Greece. The community includes the villages Lefka, Panakto and Prasino. It was the seat of the former municipality of Dervenochoria. The site of the ancient Attic fortress of Panactum is between the villages of Panakto and Prasino (formerly Kavasala).

== Population ==
Year	Village population	Community population
1981	957	-
1991	938	-
2001	666	820
2011	652	745
2021	537	629

== Geography ==
Pyli is situated at the eastern edge of the Pastra mountain. It is in a sparsely populated area, dominated by agriculture and forestry. It is 5 km west of Skourta, 19 km north of Elefsina and 20 km southeast of Thebes. The Zoodochos Pigi Church, remnant of a medieval monastery, lies 5 km to the west.

== See also ==
- List of settlements in Boeotia
