= Mandra-Eidyllia =

Mandra-Eidyllia Μάνδρα-Ειδύλλια
- Municipality
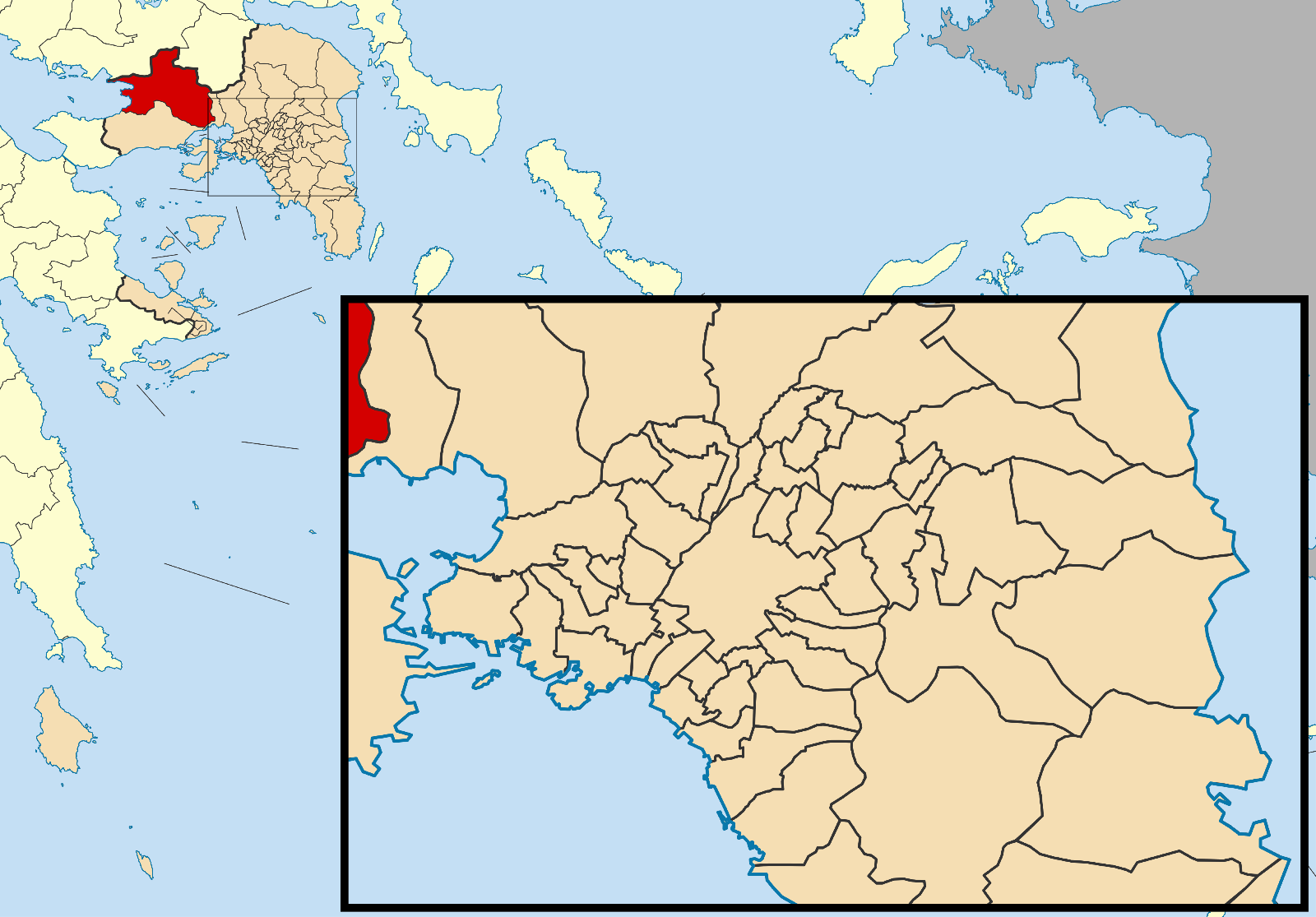

- Location within Greece
- Coordinates: 38°04′N 23°29′E
- Country: Greece
- Administrative region: Attica
- Regional unit: West Attica

Government
  - Mayor: Armodios Drikos (since 2023)

Area
  - Municipality: 426.2 km^{2} (164.6 sq mi)

Population (2021)
  - Municipality: 17,822
  - Density: 41.82/km^{2} (108.3/sq mi)
- Time zone: UTC+2 (EET)
  - Summer (DST): UTC+3 (EEST)

Mandra-Eidyllia (Greek: Μάνδρα-Ειδύλλια) is a municipality in the West Attica regional unit, Attica, Greece. The seat of the municipality is the town Mandra. The municipality has an area of 426.197 km^{2}.

== Municipality ==
The municipality Mandra–Eidyllia was formed at the 2011 local government reform by the merger of the following 4 former municipalities, that became municipal units:

- Erythres
- Mandra
- Oinoi
- Vilia
