= Davleia =

Davleia Δαύλεια
- Municipal unit
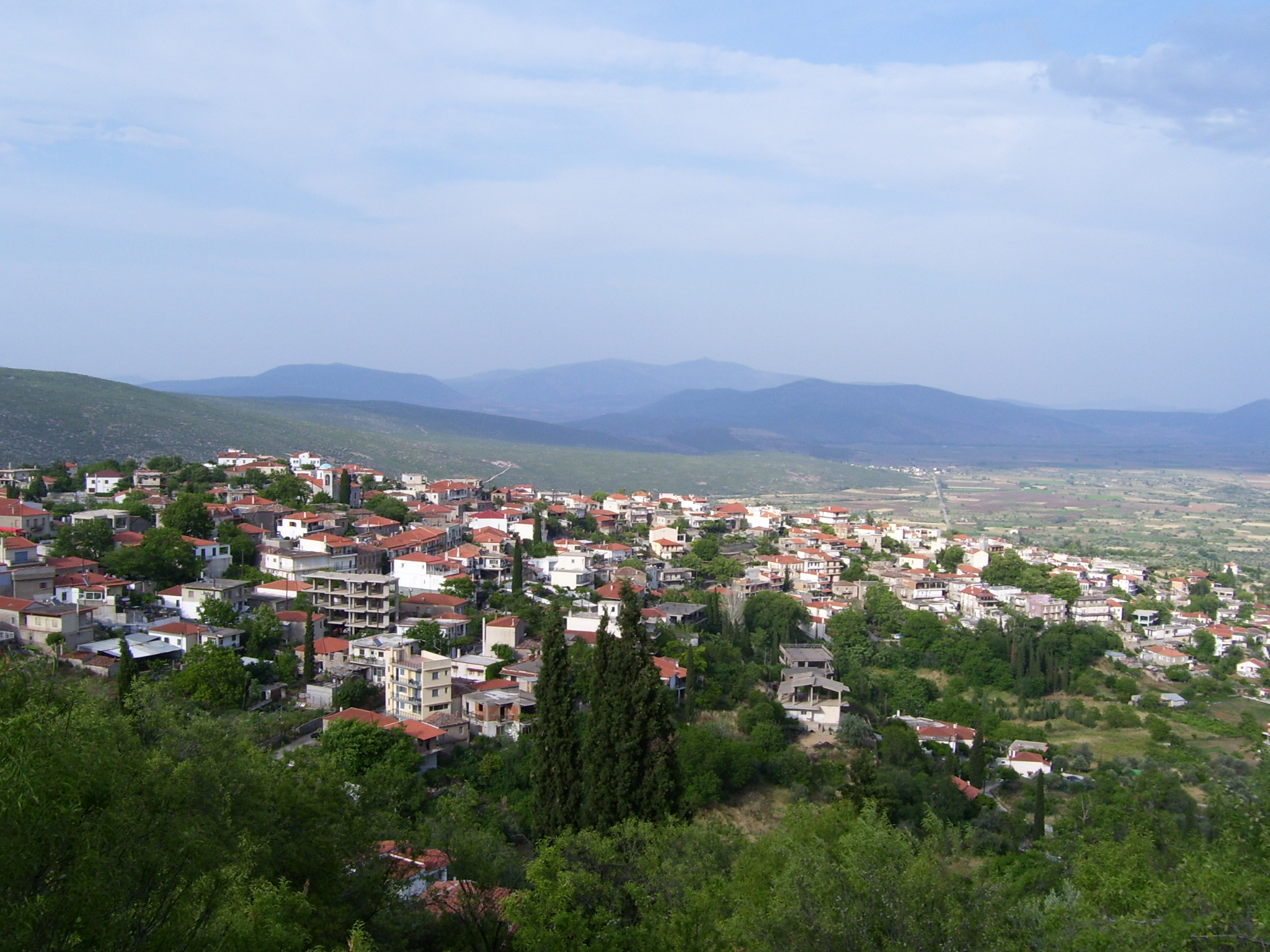
- A view of Davleia

- Location within the regional unit

- Location within Greece
- Coordinates: 38°31′N 22°44′E
- Country: Greece
- Administrative region: Central Greece
- Regional unit: Boeotia
- Municipality: Livadeia

Area
  - Municipal unit: 94.985 km^{2} (36.674 sq mi)
  - Community: 61.725 km^{2} (23.832 sq mi)
- Highest elevation: 410 m (1,350 ft)
- Lowest elevation: 260 m (850 ft)

Population (2021)
  - Municipal unit: 1,426
  - Municipal unit density: 15.01/km^{2} (38.88/sq mi)
  - Community: 1,069
  - Community density: 17.32/km^{2} (44.86/sq mi)
- Time zone: UTC+2 (EET)
  - Summer (DST): UTC+3 (EEST)
- Postal code: 320 08
- Area code: +30-2261
- Vehicle registration: ΒΙ
- Website: davlia.com

Davleia (Greek: Δαύλεια) is a village and a former municipality in Boeotia, Greece. Since the 2011 local government reform it is part of the municipality Livadeia, of which it is a municipal unit. Its name comes from the ancient settlement Daulis. The municipal unit has an area of 94.985 km^{2}, the community 61.725 km^{2}. The municipality includes the eastern portion of Mount Parnassos. Phthiotis lies to the north. Davleia is located ESE of Lamia, SW of Kamena Vourla, W of Livadeia and Thiva, NE of Itea and E of Delphi.

== Modern population ==
Year	Community	Municipal unit
1981	2,264	-
1991	2,188	-
2001	1,764	2,397
2011	1,240	1,686
2021	1,069	1,426

== History ==
=== Ancient ===
In ancient Greece, this city in Phocis was called Daulis (Δαυλίς) and at a later stage Daulia (Δαυλία) and Daulion (Δαύλιον). Mentioned by Homer, it was said to be named either in reference to the woody character of the area or after a nymph Daulis, a daughter of the river-god Cephissus.

In Greek mythology, Daulis was the hometown of Tereus.

Daulis was the city at the end of the road not taken by Oedipus.

During the Greco-Persian Wars, Daulis was destroyed for the first time in 480 BC. In 395 BC, the city was attacked by Thebes. In 346 BC, Daulis was destroyed again during the so-called Third Sacred War. In 220 BC, the city was attacked by the Aetolians. In 198 BC, the Romans occupied Daulis by a stratagem.

In Late Antiquity, Daulia was a seat of a bishop and is now a titular see of the Catholic Church.

Remains of the walls of the city's acropolis can be seen today above the modern town.

=== Modern ===
The settlement is mentioned by Frankish documents of the last years of Latin rule in Central Greece as Daulia while a few years later, specifically in 1466, it is recorded in an Ottoman settlement as Tavla, having a population of 150 families. A few decades later (1506) another Ottoman census records 220 families in Davlia.

The fighter of the Greek Revolution, Panagiotis Antonopoulos, was born in Davlia. The inhabitants of Davlia took an active part in the revolution of 1821, while the place became several times a field of conflict between the Greek revolutionaries and the Ottoman troops. In 1856, gunmen from Davlia took part in the operation to exterminate the gang of the robber Davelis.

During the period of the National Divide, on January 29, 1918, a clash took place between a gendarmerie detachment and a force of local anti-Venezuelan armed forces consisting of Epistratos and soldiers who had lost their lives. Five Cretan gendarmes and an officer were killed during the battle. On February 12 of the same year, following a military court ruling, six people (two soldiers and four civilians) were executed at the scene of the conflict and found guilty of killing gendarmes.

On 5 May 1943, the settlement was set on fire by a detachment of the Italian Occupation forces, while on 21 October 1948, the DSE captain Pantelis Laskas (Pelopidas) was killed in an ambush by the National Guard and the gendarmerie.

== Sights ==
The fortifications of the ancient city and some other buildings are preserved in good condition. Sights of the area are the nunnery "Holy Monastery of Jerusalem" located a little north of Davlia and the ruins of the church of Agios Theodoros in the castle. Near Davlia, Greek mythology places the point where Oedipus, on his way to Delphi, killed his father Laius.

== Sport ==
In the settlement is located the football club A.P.O. Pandavliakos, which was founded in 1936.

== Transport ==
=== Road ===
National Road 3 passes near the village connecting it with Livadia, Lamia and other cities of mainland Greece.

=== Rail ===
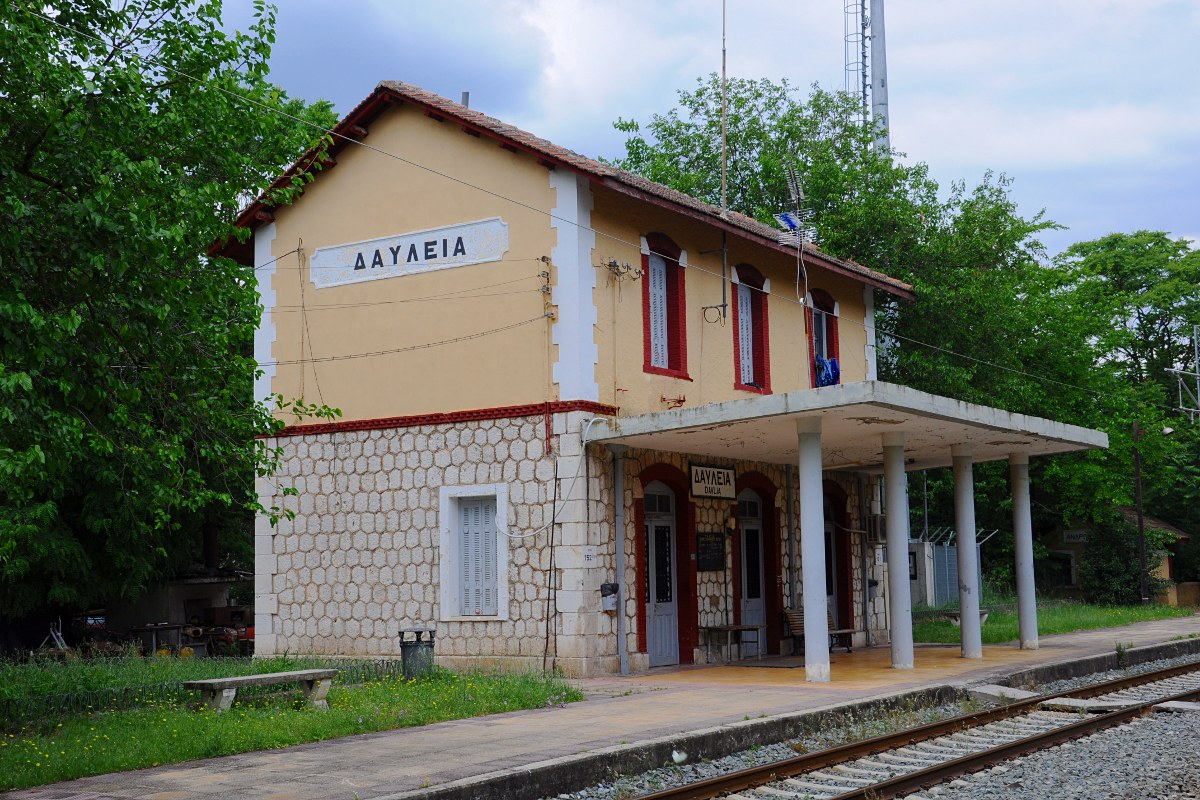
The railway station of Davleia.

The village is served by Davleia railway station, situated 8.3 kilometres (5.2 mi) north of the settlement on the Athens-Leianokladi railway with regional services to Athens and Leianokladi.

== See also ==
- List of settlements in Boeotia
