= Thisvi =

Thisvi Θίσβη
- Municipal unit
- Location within the regional unit

- Location within Greece
- Coordinates: 38°16′N 22°58′E
- Country: Greece
- Administrative region: Central Greece
- Regional unit: Boeotia
- Municipality: Thebes

Area
  - Municipal unit: 245.492 km^{2} (94.785 sq mi)
  - Community: 39.350 km^{2} (15.193 sq mi)

Population (2021)
  - Municipal unit: 2,367
  - Municipal unit density: 9.642/km^{2} (24.97/sq mi)
  - Community: 337
  - Community density: 8.56/km^{2} (22.2/sq mi)
- Time zone: UTC+2 (EET)
  - Summer (DST): UTC+3 (EEST)
- Vehicle registration: ΒΙ

Thisvi (Greek: Θίσβη) is a village and a former municipality in Boeotia, Greece. Since the 2011 local government reform it is part of the municipality Thebes, of which it is a municipal unit. The municipal unit has an area of 245.492 km^{2}, the community 39.350 km^{2}. Population 2,367 (2021).

The municipal unit consists of the communities of Chostia, Domvraina, Ellopia, Thisvi and Xironomi. The seat of the former municipality was in Domvraina. The municipal unit is named after the Mycenaean city (now ruined) of Thisbe, which is mentioned by Homer in the Iliad's Catalogue of Ships as a participant in the Trojan War. The scant remains of the Mycenaean acropolis that is surrounded by Cyclopean walls is located on a hill called Palaiokastro which is to the Northwest of the town.
