= Erythres =

Erythres Ερυθρές
- Municipal unit
- Location within the regional unit

- Location within Greece
- Coordinates: 38°13′N 23°19′E
- Country: Greece
- Administrative region: Attica
- Regional unit: West Attica
- Municipality: Mandra-Eidyllia

Area
  - Municipal unit: 61.145 km^{2} (23.608 sq mi)
- Elevation: 390 m (1,280 ft)

Population (2021)
  - Municipal unit: 2,567
  - Municipal unit density: 41.98/km^{2} (108.7/sq mi)
- Time zone: UTC+2 (EET)
  - Summer (DST): UTC+3 (EEST)
- Postal code: 190 08
- Area code: 22630
- Vehicle registration: Z
- Website: www.erythres.gr

Erythres /ˈɛrɪθriːz/ (Greek: Ερυθρές, formerly known as Kriekouki, Greek: Κριεκούκι) is a village and a former municipality in the northernmost part of West Attica, Greece. Since the 2011 local government reform it is part of the municipality Mandra-Eidyllia, of which it is a municipal unit. The municipal unit has an area of 61.145 km^{2}. It is part of Athens metropolitan area. Erythres was named after the ancient city of Erythrae, the ruins of which are located 1.5 km east of the present town. The inhabitants of Erythres are Arvanites. The Greek National Road 3 (Elefsina - Thebes - Florina) passes through Erythres. The area south of Erythres is mountainous, with the Kithaironas to the southwest and the Pastra to the southeast. The area north of Erythres is characterised by the wide, flat valley of the Boeotian river Asopos, that flows to the east along the northern border of the municipal unit. This area is dominated by farmlands. Erythres is located 5 km east of Plataies, 6 km north of Vilia, 12 km south of Thebes and 44 km northwest of Athens.

== Historical population ==
| Year | Population |
|---|---|
| 1981 | 3,550 |
| 1991 | 3,519 |
| 2001 | 3,326 |
| 2011 | 3,349 |
