= Megaris =

Megaris Μεγαρίς
- Region of Ancient Greece
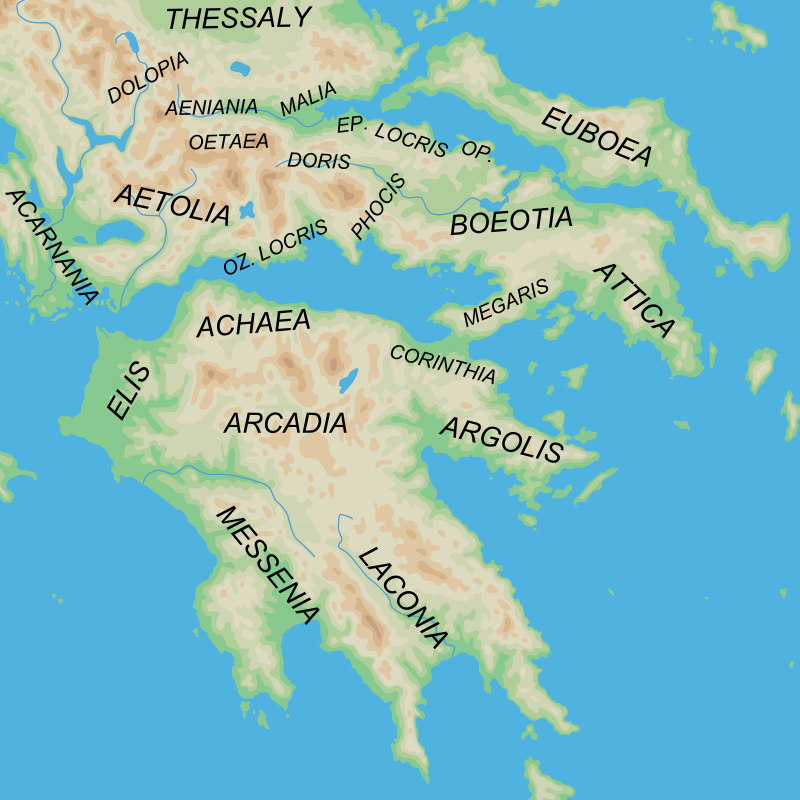
- Map showing Megaris in relation to other regions
- Location: Central Greece
- Major cities: Megara
- Dialects: Doric

Megaris (Ancient Greek: Μεγαρίς) was a small but populous state of ancient Greece, west of Attica and north of Corinthia, whose inhabitants were adventurous seafarers, credited with deceitful propensities. The capital, Megara, was famous for white marble and fine clay. Mount Geraneia dominated the center of the region. The island of Salamis was originally under the control of Megara, before it was lost to Athens in the late 7th century BCE.

== Province ==
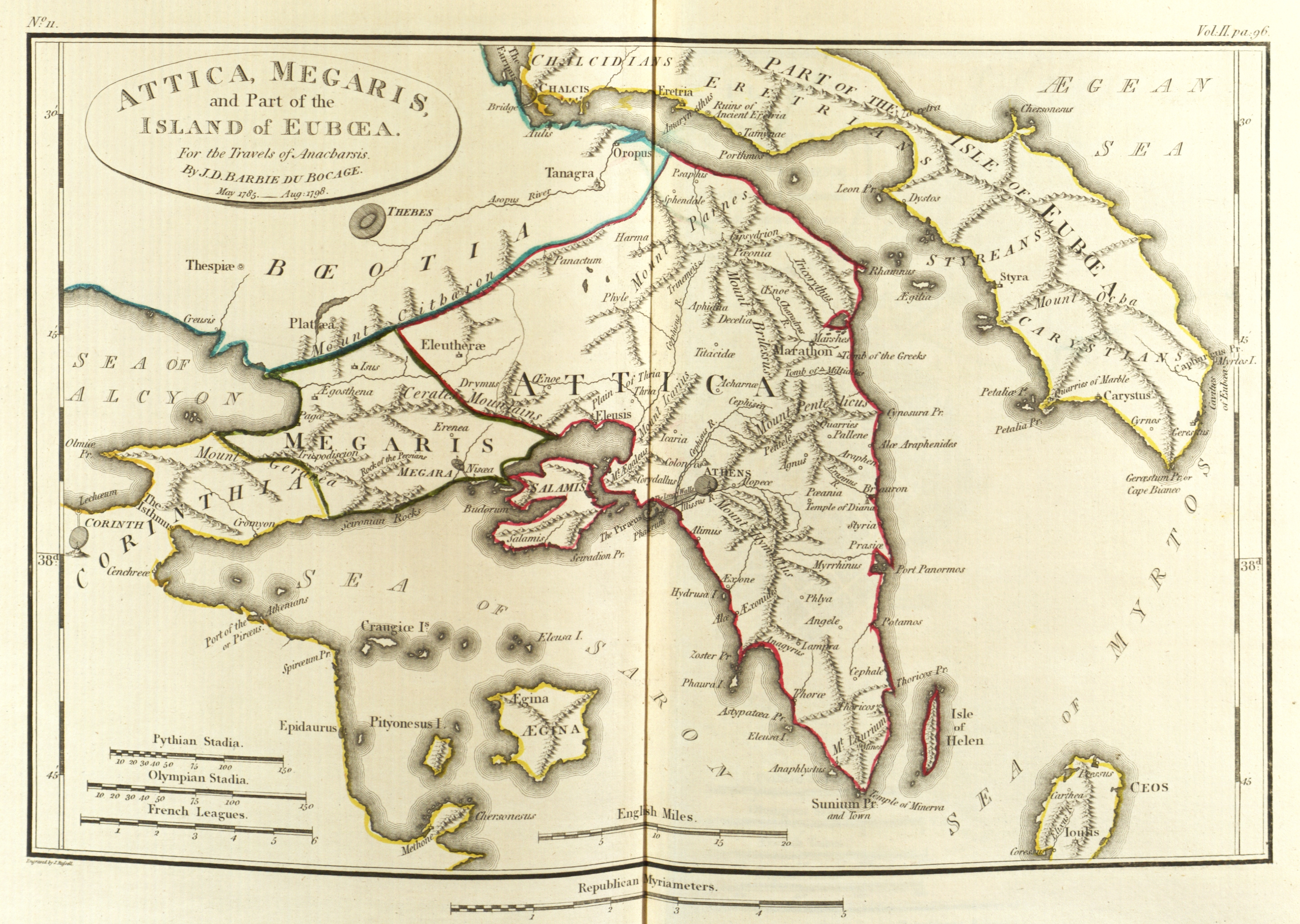
Map of ancient Megaris

The province of Megaris or Megarida (Greek: Επαρχία Μεγαρίδας or Μεγαρίδα) was one of the provinces of the East Attica Prefecture. Its territory corresponded with that of the current municipalities Aspropyrgos, Eleusis, Mandra-Eidyllia and Megara. It was abolished in 2006.
