= West Attica =

West Attica Περιφερειακή ενότητα Δυτικής Αττικής
- Regional unit
- Municipalities of West Attica

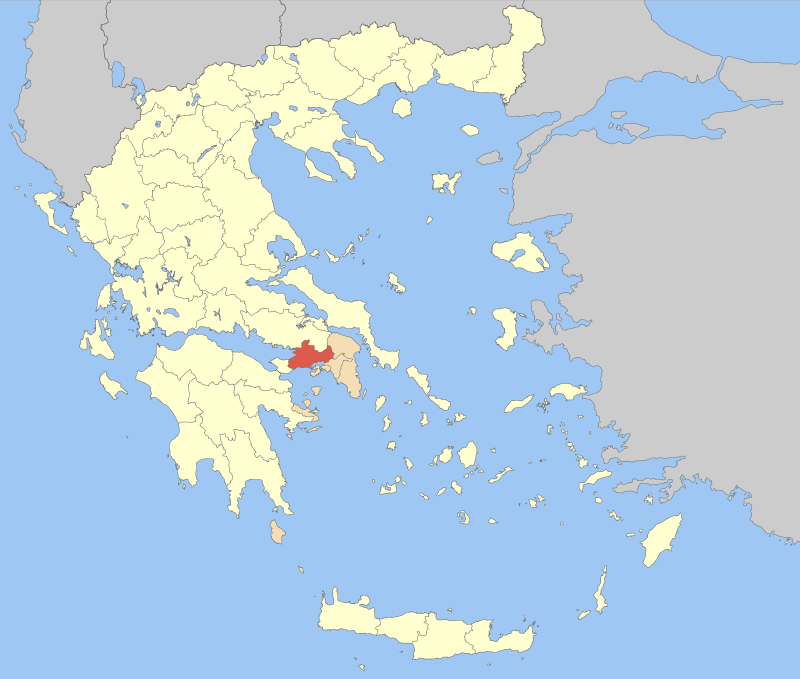
- West Attica within Greece

- Location within Greece
- Coordinates: 38°2′N 23°32′E
- Country: Greece
- Administrative region: Attica
- Seat: Elefsina

Area
  - Total: 1,004 km^{2} (388 sq mi)

Population (2021)
  - Total: 165,540
  - Density: 164.9/km^{2} (427.0/sq mi)
- Time zone: UTC+2 (EET)
  - Summer (DST): UTC+3 (EEST)
- Postal code: 1xx xx
- Area code: 210, 22960, 22630
- Vehicle registration: ΥΡ, ΥΤ, ΖΤ
- Website: dytikiattiki.org

West Attica (Greek: Δυτική Αττική) is one of the regional units of Greece. It is part of the region of Attica. The regional unit covers the western part of the agglomeration of Athens, and the area to its west.

== Administration ==
The regional unit West Attica is subdivided into 5 municipalities. These are (number as in the map in the infobox):

- Aspropyrgos (2)
- Elefsina (1)
- Fyli (5)
- Mandra-Eidyllia (3)
- Megara (4)

With respect to parliamentary elections West Attica belongs to the electoral district of Attica.

=== Prefecture ===
As a part of the 2011 Kallikratis government reform, the regional unit West Attica was created out of the former prefecture West Attica (Greek: νομαρχία Δυτικής Αττικής). The prefecture had the same territory as the present regional unit. At the same time, the municipalities were reorganised, according to the table below.

New municipality	Old municipalities	Seat
Aspropyrgos	Aspropyrgos	Aspropyrgos
Elefsina	Elefsina	Elefsina
Elefsina	Magoula	Elefsina
Fyli	Fyli	Ano Liosia
Fyli	Ano Liosia	Ano Liosia
Fyli	Zefyri	Ano Liosia
Mandra-Eidyllia	Mandra	Mandra
Mandra-Eidyllia	Erythres	Mandra
Mandra-Eidyllia	Oinoi	Mandra
Mandra-Eidyllia	Vilia	Mandra
Megara	Megara	Megara
Megara	Nea Peramos	Megara

=== Provinces ===
There were two provinces in the prefecture of West Attica: Megarida, and the Attica Province (most of which was part of East Attica). They were abolished in 2006.

== See also ==
- List of settlements in Attica
