= Cithaeron =

Mountain range in Greece

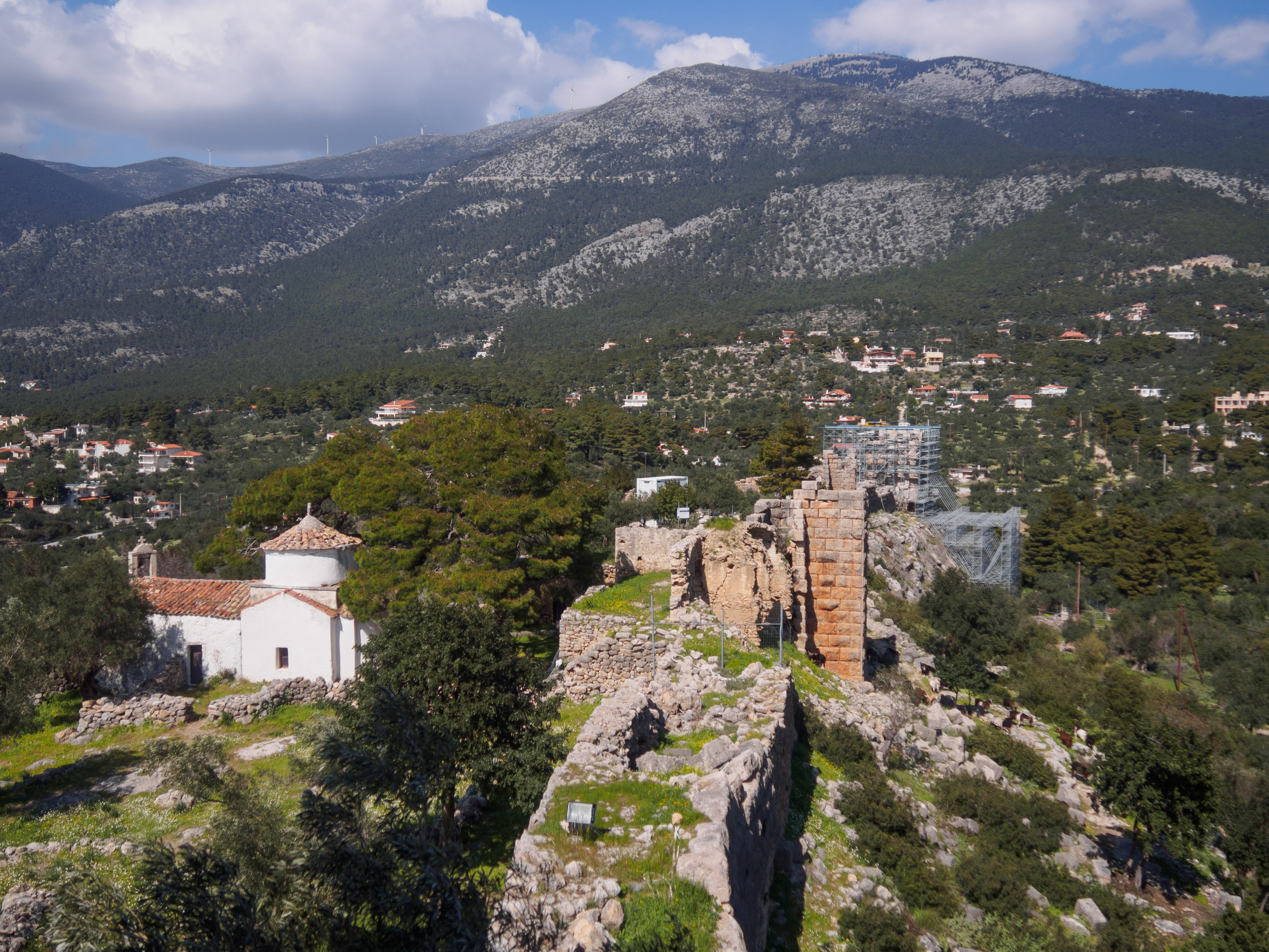
- View of Cithaeron from Aigosthena

Highest point
- Elevation: 1,409 m (4,623 ft)
- Coordinates: 38°11′03″N 23°14′57″E

Geography
- Location within Greece
- Location: Attica, Greece; Boeotia, Greece

Cithaeron or Kithairon (Κιθαιρών, -ῶνος) is a mountain and mountain range about sixteen kilometres (ten miles) long in Central Greece. The range is the physical boundary between Boeotia region in the north and Attica region in the south. It is mainly composed of limestone and rises to 1,409 metres (4,623 ft). The north-east side of the range is formed by the mountain Pastra.

The range was the scene of many events in Greek mythology and was especially sacred to Dionysus. In Euripides' Bacchae, Dionysus carries out his dances and rites with his bacchants, his priestesses, on Cithaeron. Oedipus was exposed on the mountain, while Actaeon and Pentheus were both dismembered on its slopes. It was also the place where Heracles or Alcathous hunted and killed the Lion of Cithaeron.

In historic times, the mountain acted as a backdrop to the Battle of Plataea of 479 BC and was the scene of much skirmishing before the battle itself. In later times, fortifications were built both at Plataea and Erythrai as the mountain formed the disputed natural border between Athens and Thebes.

The people of Plataea also personified the mountain as their primal king: "But the Plataeans know of no king except Asopus and Cithaeron before him, holding that the latter gave his name to the mountain, the former to the river". In one tale, Cithairon was said to have engaged in a singing contest against Helikon, which was judged by the Muses. Cithairon won the contest and was adorned with garlands by the Muses, and Helikon became so angry due to his defeat that he smashed one of the large rocks on his slopes.

In the Middle Ages, the village of Myoupolis on its slopes was the site of a monastery founded by Meletios the Younger.
