= Tacchinardi =

Tacchinardi is an Italian surname. Notable people with the surname include:

- Alessio Tacchinardi (born 1975), Italian footballer and manager
- Fanny Tacchinardi Persiani (1812–1867), Italian opera singer
- Massimiliano Tacchinardi (born 1971), Italian footballer
- Nicola Tacchinardi (1772–1859), Italian opera singer
