= Ugo Giletta =

Italian artist

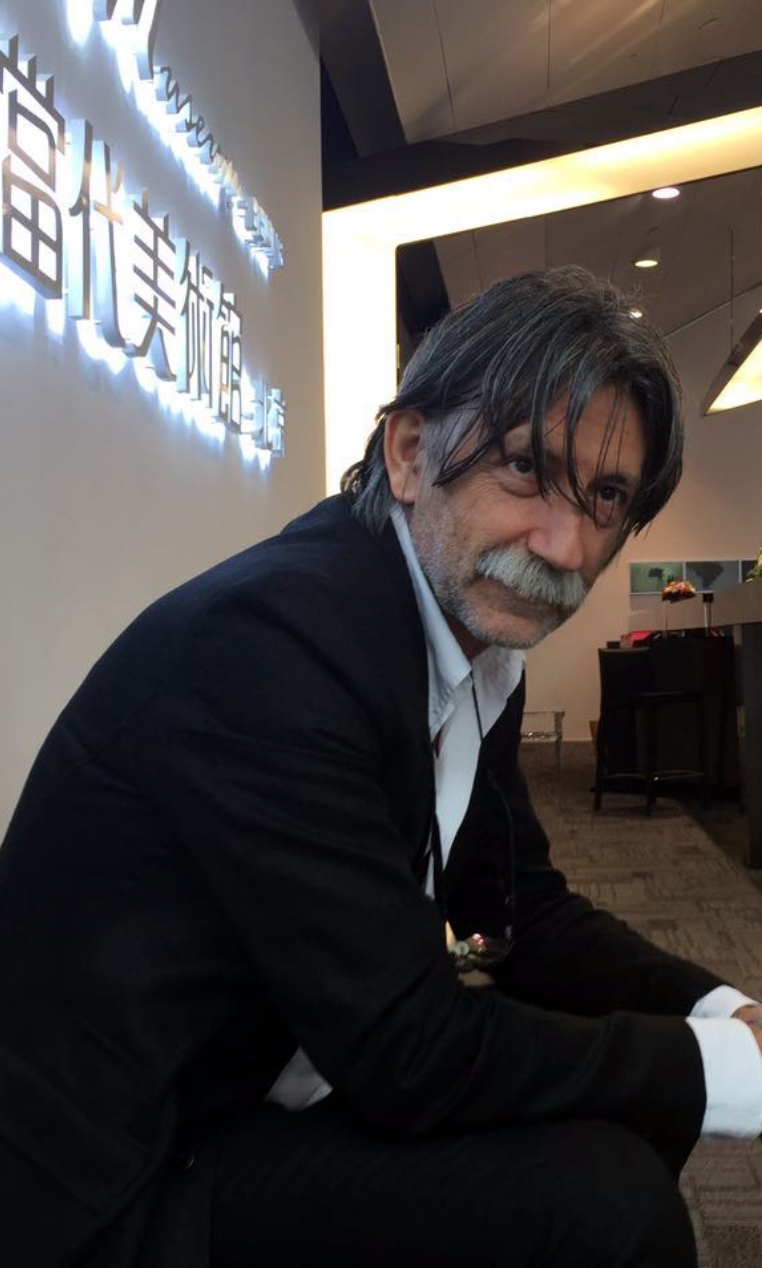
The artist Ugo Giletta.

Ugo Giletta (born 1957 in San Firmino di Revello) is an Italian artist.

== Career ==
Giletta's exhibition activity began in the early 1980s with solo exhibitions such as Cavassa '87 (1987, Civic Museum of Casa Cavassa, Saluzzo) and Il colore della forma (1989, Quadreria d’arte, Cuneo).

Starting from the 1990s, Giletta appeared at institutional exhibitions in various locations in Piedmont and beyond: Tempo d’arte (1991, Torino Esposizioni, Turin), Intermedia (1992, Crawford Gallery of Cork, Ireland), Fantastica automazione (1993, Fondazione Marazza, Borgomanero), Proposte IX (1993, Palazzo IRV, Piedmont Region, Turin), Traiettorie sonore (1995, Villa Olmo, Como), From 200 to 2000 (1995, Palazzo Dugentesco, Vercelli).

In 1999, with the writer Nico Orengo, he produced the multimedia show The Melancholy Death of Oyster Boy, freely adapted from the book of the same name by Tim Burton, presented at the Doge’s Palace ([Ducale]) in Genoa; his collaboration with poets and writers also includes the creation of some art books for Edizioni Pulcinoelefante, especially with Orengo and the poet Alda Merini.

Since 2000, Giletta has exhibited his works nationally and internationally in art galleries, institutions and museums in Italy, France, Belgium, Hungary, Austria, Germany, South Korea, China, and Singapore. In 2003, he was a finalist at the Mastroianni International Award. He took part in other exhibitions, among which, in 2016, the Challenging Beauty Insights of Italian Contemporary Art at the Parkview Green Museum, Beijing, an exhibition illustrating the contemporary scene of Italian art from the 1960s to the present day, from Poor Art to Transavantgarde, from the New Roman School to the generations of artists of the Nineties and Zero’s. MOVING TALES Racconti in movimento (Cuneo Civic Museum), an international selection of 30 video works from La Gaia Collection of Cuneo.

In 2019, at the Church of Saint Paul in Kotor, Montenegro, an exhibition entitled “The Face of the Other” was organized for him by the Community of Italians in Montenegro, in collaboration with the Popular University of Trieste and under the patronage of the Embassy of Italy in Montenegro.

In the summer of 2022, he took part in the international program of Fondazione Aria dedicated to contemporary art and culture, the IX edition of Stills of Peace and Everyday Life – Italy and Armenia, as the Italian artist invited to exhibit his works at the Cisterns of Palazzo Acquaviva in Atri, in a show entitled “Apparitions, Bonds.”

In October 2025, on the occasion of the celebrations for “Napoli 2500”, he was invited to present several symbolic works at the National Museum of Capodimonte in the exhibition NAFRICA-MASKS (Memory & Identity / Men or Masks) curated by Simon Njami.

== Image gallery ==
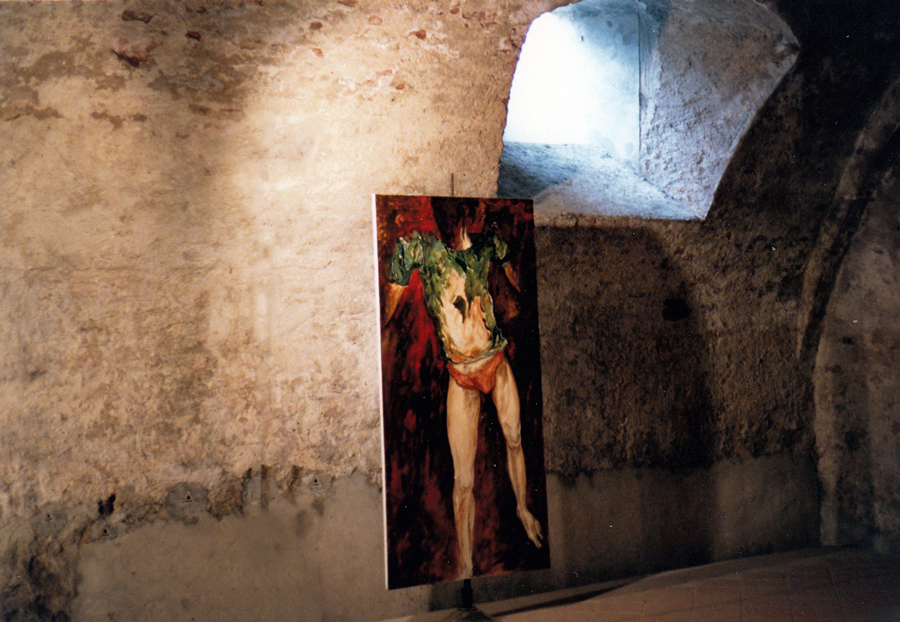
"Cavassa 87" (1987), Civic Museum of Casa Cavassa Saluzzo

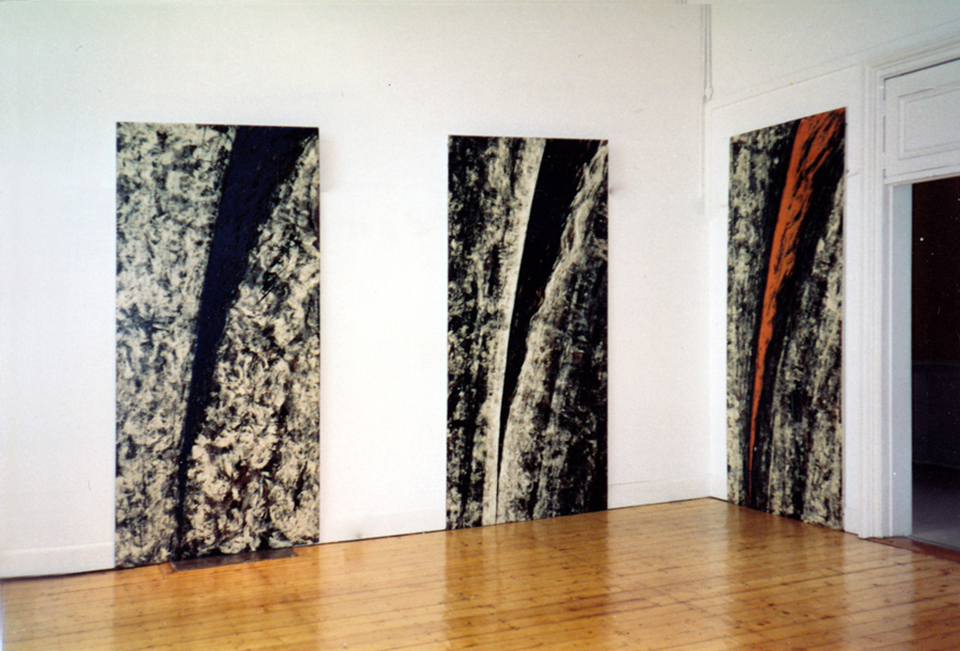
"Intermedia" (1992) The Crawford Art Gallery di Cork, Irlanda

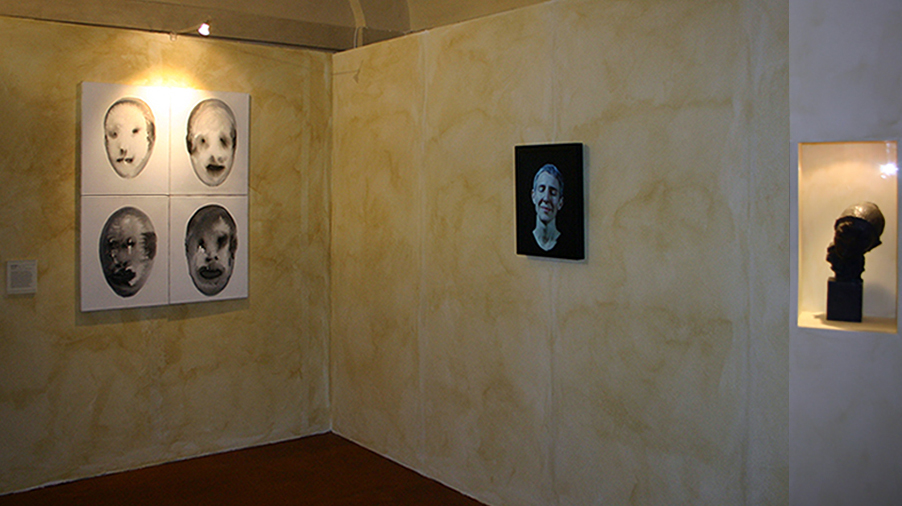
Collectors 1 works from the La Gaia Collection. (2006) Filatoio Rosso, Caraglio, CN

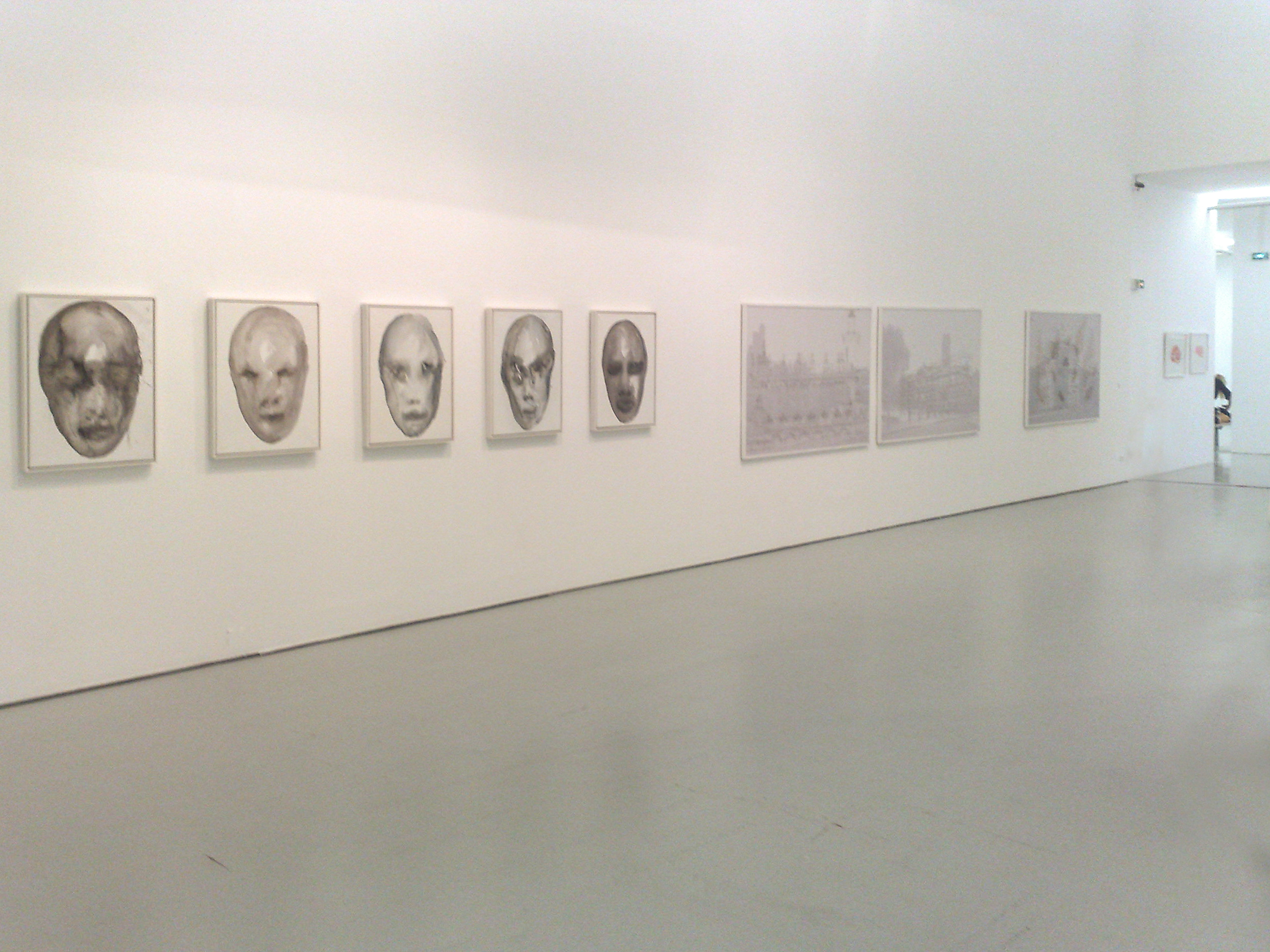
Fragile, lands of empathy. (2009) MAM - Museum of modern art of Saint-Étienne France

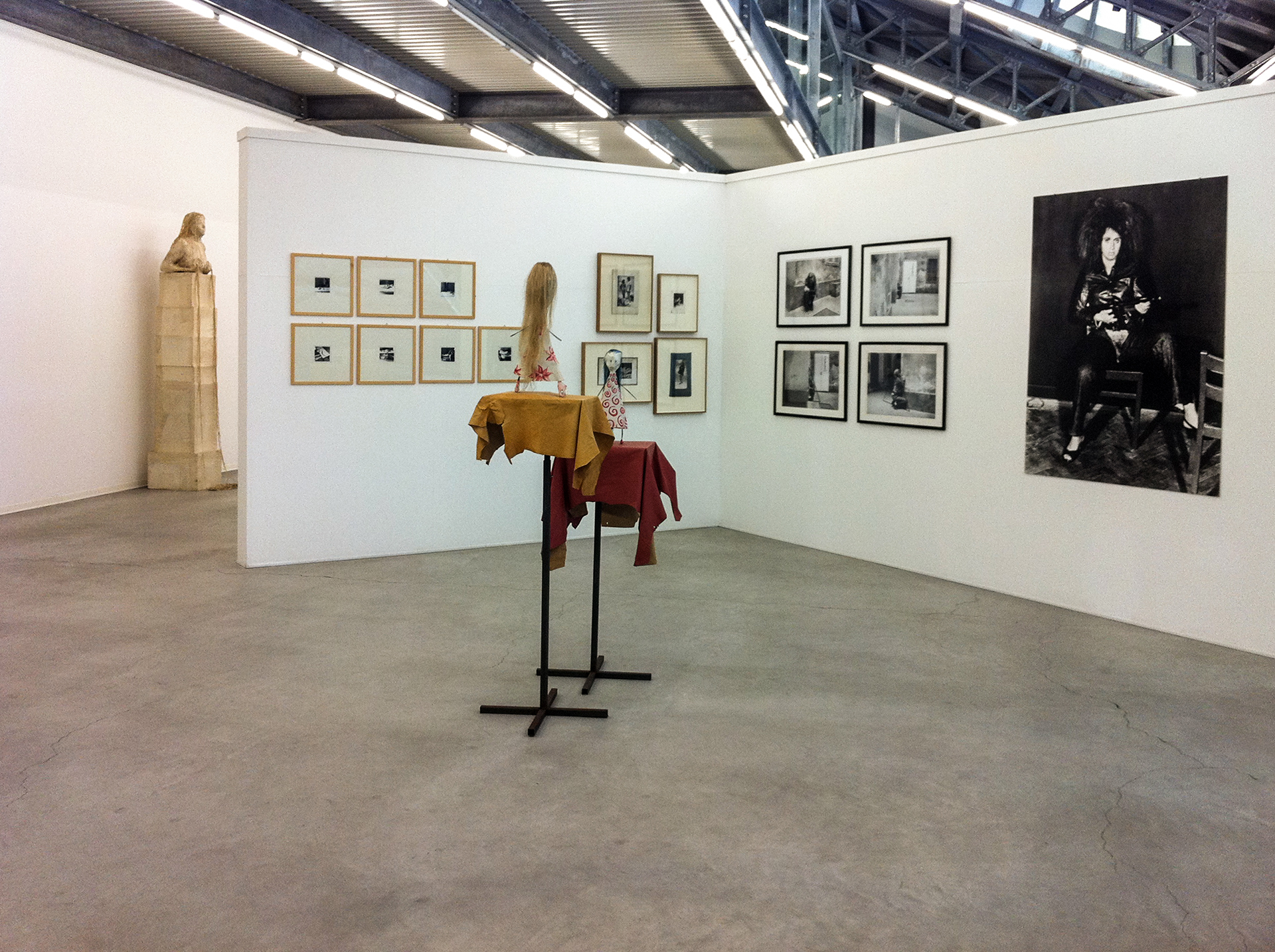
Works permanently in the La Gaia Collection in Busca

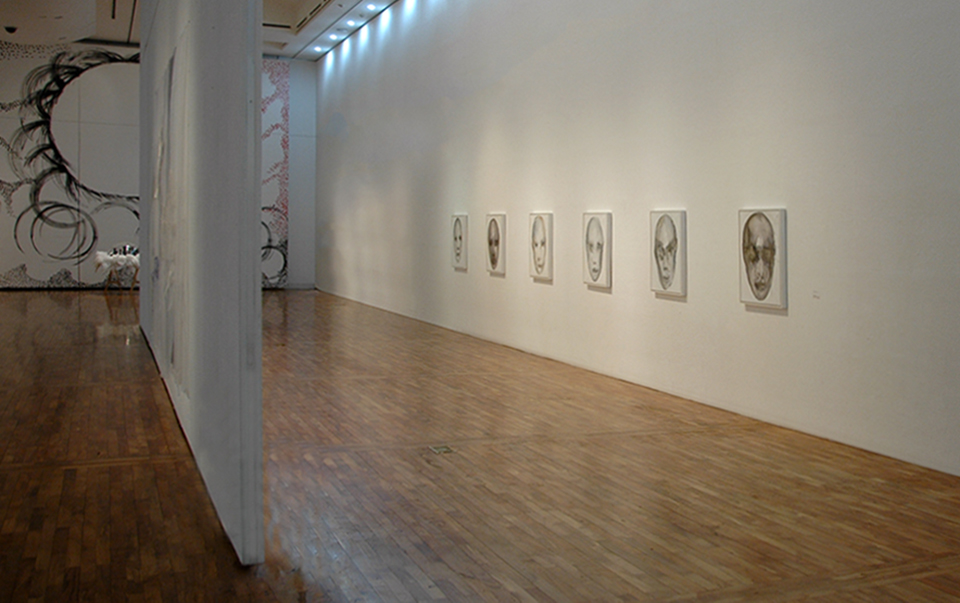
"Fragile, lands of empathy" (2010) Daejeon Museum of Art. Daejeon, South Korea

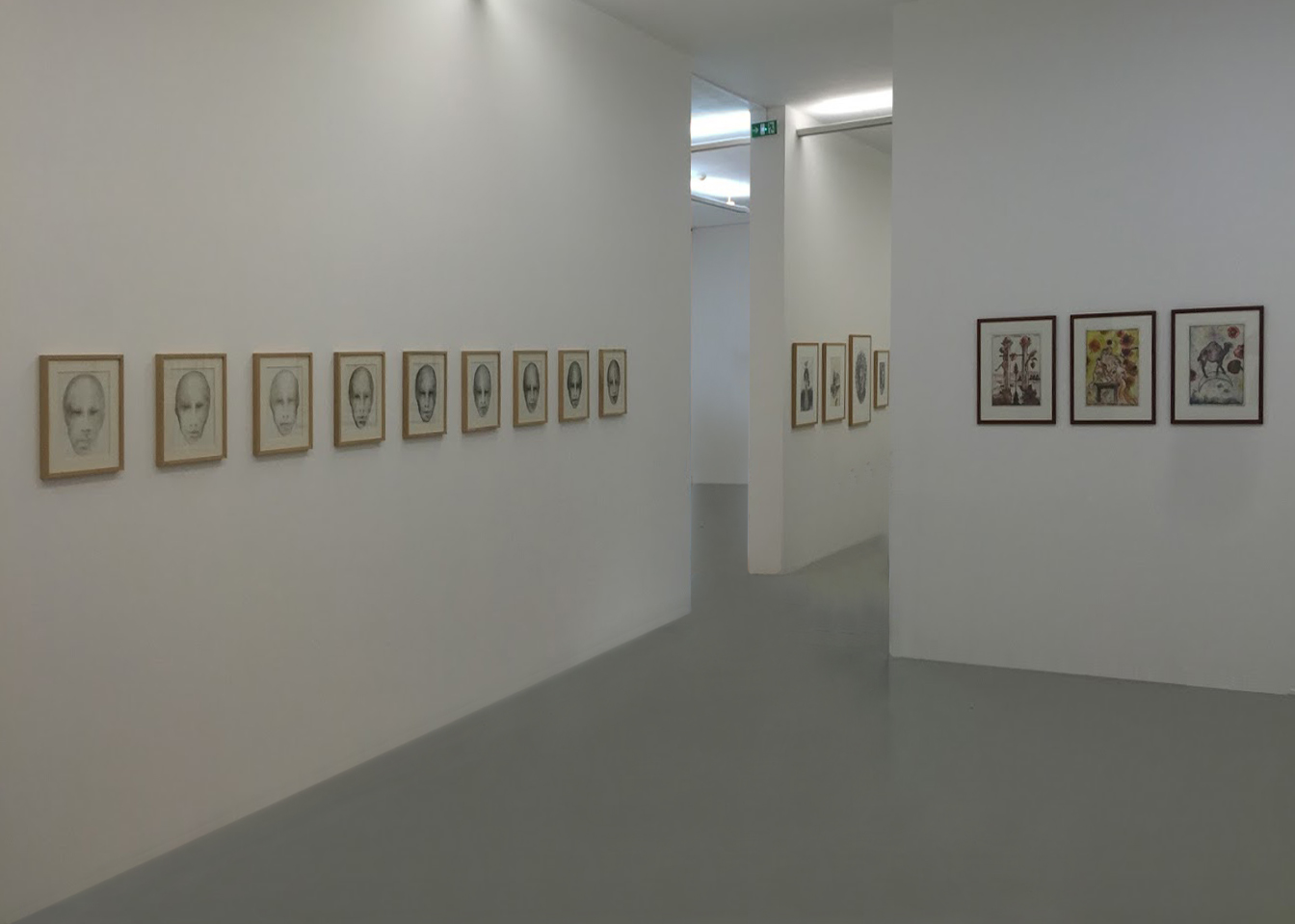
"Intrigantes incertitudes" (2016) Museum of modern art of Saint-Étienne, France

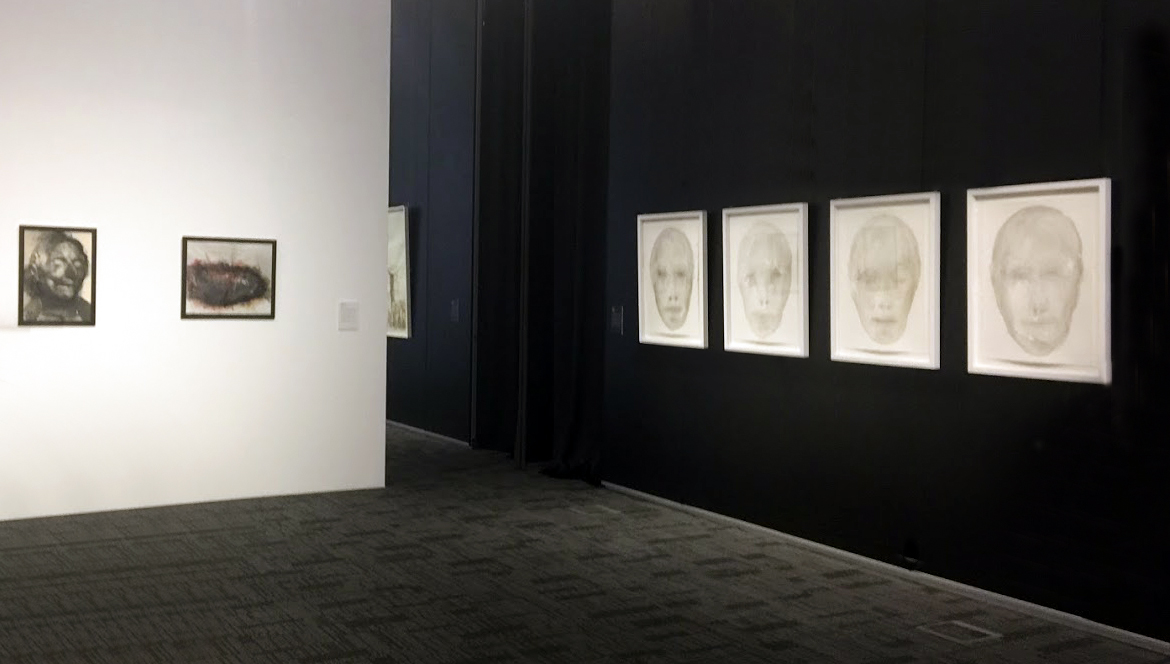
"The Artist's Voice". (2017) The Parkview Museum Singapore Singapore

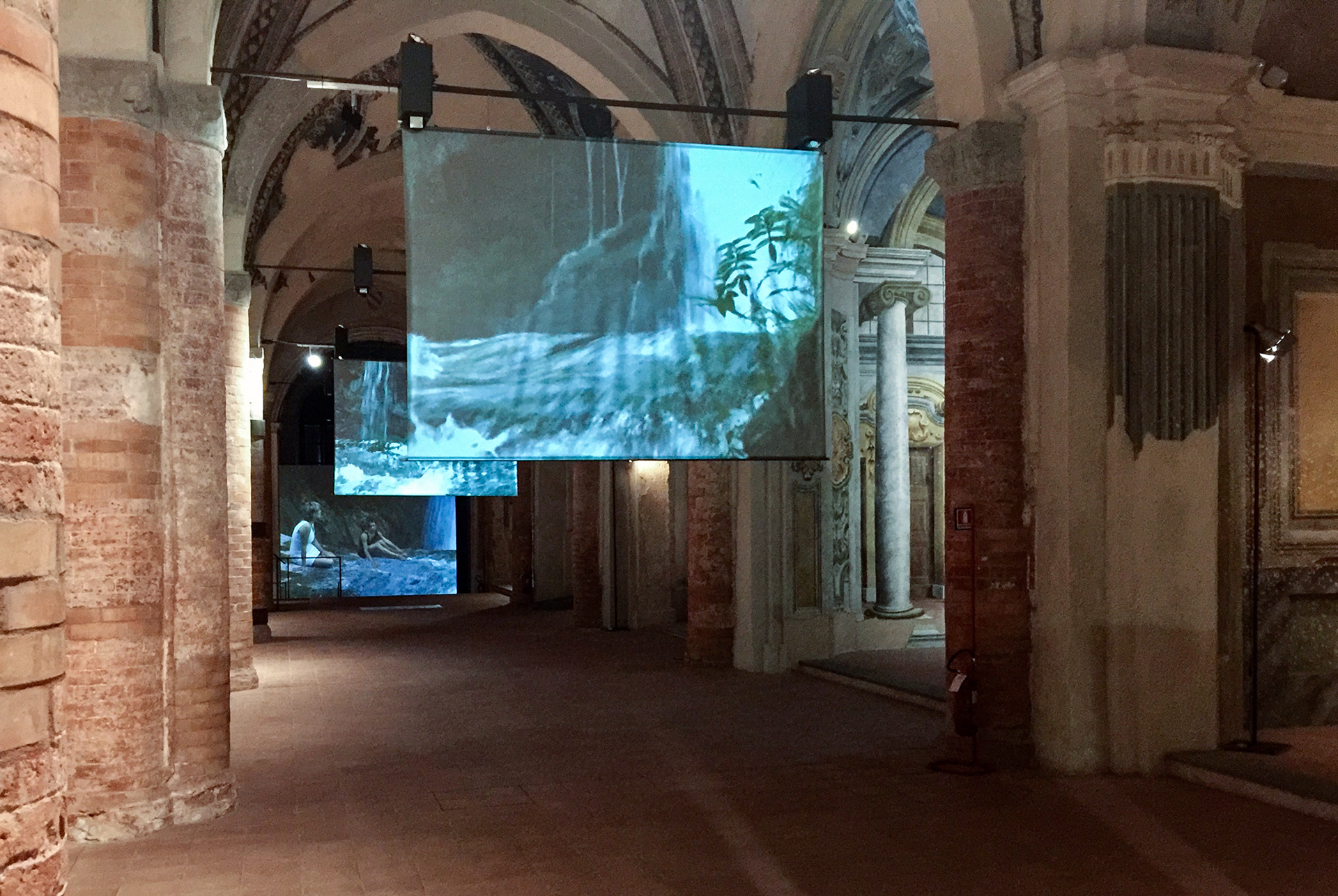
Le Spine della Complessità. Arte e artisti tra globale e locale. (2017) Monumental complex of San Francesco, uneo

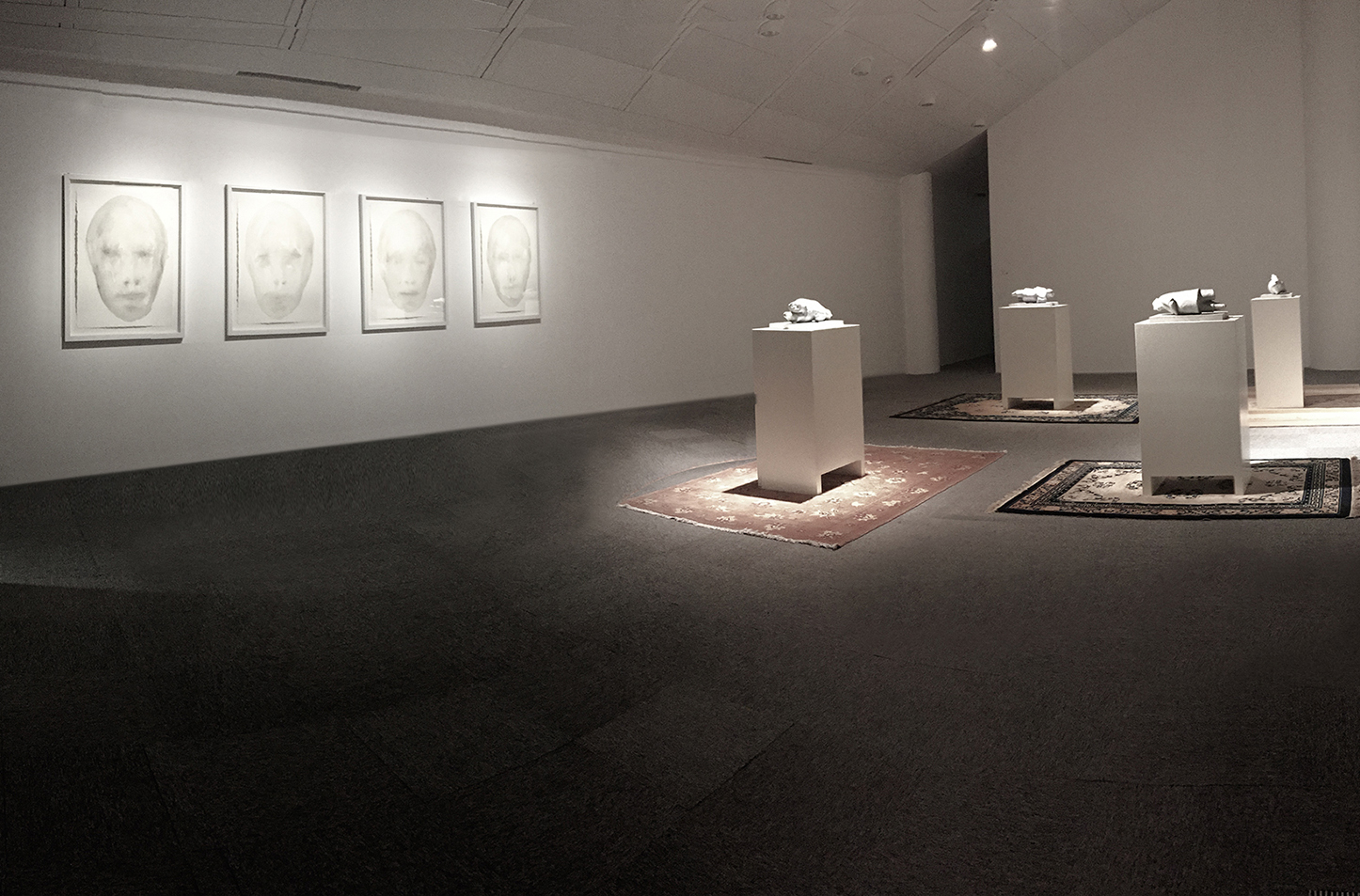
"The Artist's Voice" (2018) The Parkview Green Museum - Beijin

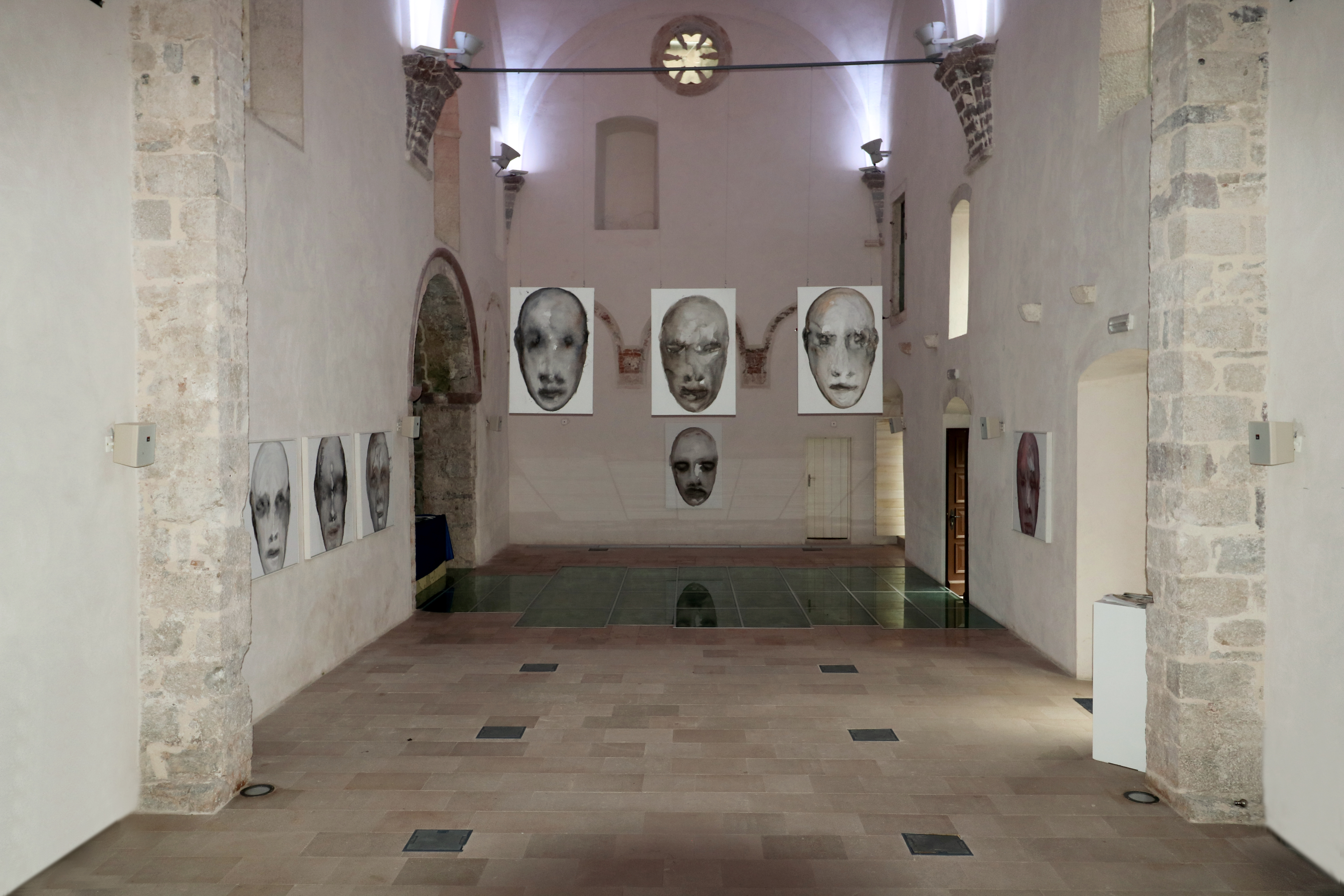
"Il Volto dell’altro" (2019) Former Church of San Paolo Cattaro (Kotor) - Republic of Montenegro

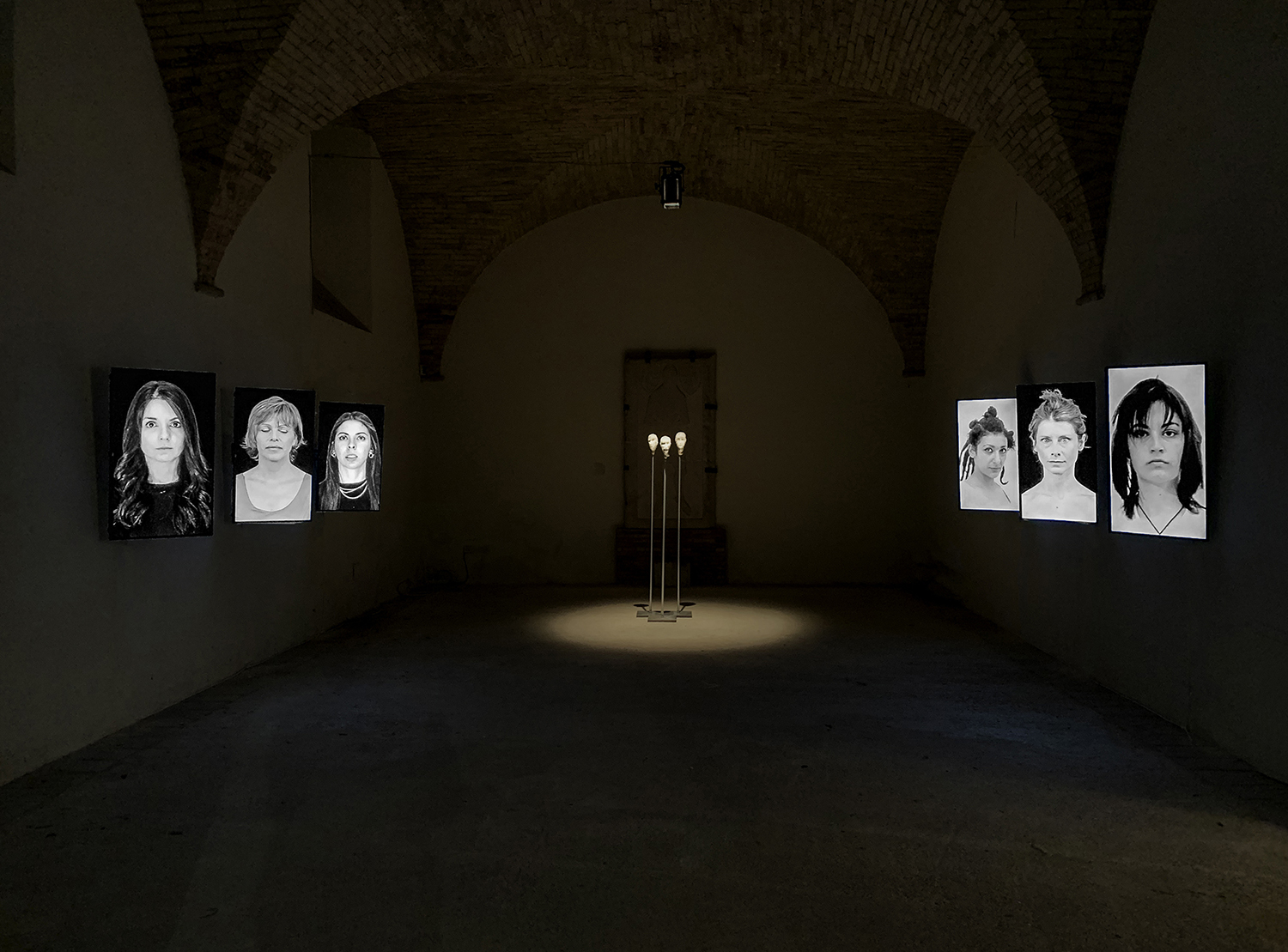
"Apparizioni, legami". (2022) Cisterne di Palazzo Acquaviva. Atri

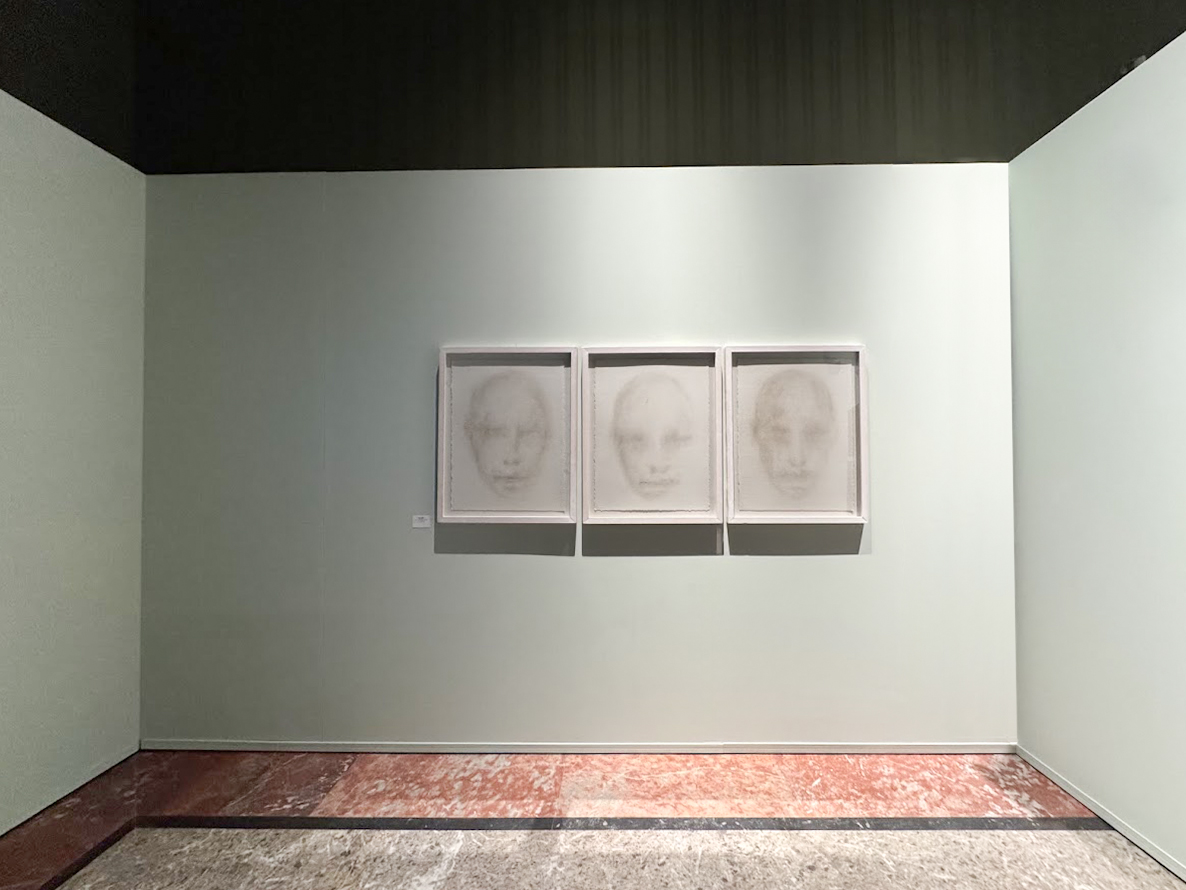
Detail of the exhibition NAFRICA - MASKS (Memories and Identities / Men or Masks) at the Capodimonte Museum in Naples

== Artistic activity ==
Ugo Giletta's artistic career has been characterized by the use of various techniques including painting, drawing, sculpture and video installations. As Francesco Poli writes: "All his work, although diversified, merges into a poetic underlying restlessness that deals with the enigma of existence.”

The painting is realized with watercolor on paper and canvas of various sizes, while all the drawings are created in pastel. Ugo Giletta works almost exclusively with the human face, as Guido Curto noted, "... facial features lack a precise connotation, they are portraits that do not depict anyone, but represent only the fluid identity of our Western mass globalized society." Lea Mattarella describes these works as figures that outline lonely and isolated heads and faces in an indefinite emptiness that cannot be easily contextualized. Historian and art critic Lóránd Hegyi sums it up: "These are figurations that are simply present, in their objectivity, without the need for explanations as to whom they belong or where they come from. The fascinating journey exactly means delving into their uniqueness"

When Giletta uses the video in his installations, as well as in his sculptures, the figures are considered by critics as sad beings, painfully lost, forgotten, ruined. Giovanni Tesio writes in this regard: "... imprisoned inside a wholly inner language, they come from the emptiness and aspire to a shared silence." To emphasize the poetics of the artist’s entire work, Lóránd Hegyi adds: "... for this reason we can’t look at them without compassion, without empathy, since, in their essence, the slow process of disappearance, the unstoppable process of loss, acquires a poetically powerful form."

== Exhibitions ==
- NAFRICA-MASKS (Memories & Identity / Men or Masks), 2025, curated by Simon Njami Museum and Royal Wood of Capodimonte Napoli Italy.
- EVOCATIONS | A Nomadic Exhibition Project, curated by Lóránd Hegyi, (Faur Zsófi Galéria, Budapest. Ungheria)
- Apparizioni, Legami, curated by Antonio Zimarino, (2022 Cisterne di Palazzo Acquaviva. Atri TE Italy)
- Tre nuovi artisti della collezione del Museo d’Arte Contemporanea di Piscina (2022 Piscina, TO, Italy)
- Approcci al Concreto, curated by Lorand Hegyi, (2021 Villa Belvedere già Radicati, Saluzzo, Italy)
- Il volto dell’altro, curated by Marco Puntin (2019 Ex Chiesa di San Paolo, Cattaro (Kotor), Republic of Montenegro
- Dentro il disegno/Inside the Drawing, curated by Lorand Hegyi (2019 La Castiglia Saluzzo - Italy)
- Intriguing uncertainties (2019 Parkview Museum, Beijing - China)
- Ad Acqua (2018/2019 Pinacoteca Accademia Albertina, Torino - Italy)
- Art and Mission: George Wong 1952-2017 (2018/2019 Parkview Museum, Beijing - China)
- Uncertainties / Improbabilities (Sep 7th – Oct 27th 2018 Hopstreet Gallery, Brussels - Belgium)
- "Viennaline" curated_by (Sep 14th – Oct 13th 2018 Galerie Mario Mauroner, Vienna - Austria)
- Volto: (09.06.-19.07.2018 Galerie Martin Mertens, Berlin - Germany)
- The Artist's Voice (2018 Parkview Museum, Beijing - China)
- The Artist's Voice (2017, Parkview Museum, Singapore)
- Le spine della complessità. Arte e artisti tra globale e locale (2017, Complesso Monumentale di San Francesco. Museo Civico di Cuneo - Italy)
- Intrigantes Incertitudes (2016, intMuseo d'arte moderna di Sa-Étienne - France)
- Challenging beauty Insights of Italian Contemporary Art (2016, Parkview Green Museum, Beijing - China)
- MOVING TALES Racconti in movimento (2016, Complesso Monumentale di San Francesco, Museo Civico di Cuneo - Italy)
- Significanti Incertezze (2016 Galerie Placido, Parigi - France)
- Lympha (2016, Civica Galleria d'Arte Contemporanea Filippo Scroppo, Torre Pellice - Italy),
- 40+1 Der zweite Teil (2015, Heike Curtze, Vienna - Austria).
- Le naufrage (2015, Musée de la Corse di Corte - Corsica).
- Identità in divenire, piccole storie di infinita alterità (2014, CeSAC Centro Sperimentale per le Arti Contemporanee, Filatoio Rosso di Caraglio - Italy)
- Almanach cabinet de dessin (2014, Galerie Heike Curtze, Vienna - Austria)
- Volti, (2013, Gallery 604, Busan - Corea del Sud)
- Experience of Empathy (2013, Il Fondaco, Bra - Italy)
- 54ª Biennale di Venezia, Anteprima (2011 Museo regionale di scienze naturali, Torino - Italy)
- Cabinet des dessins (2011, Villa La Versiliana, Marina di Pietrasanta - Italy)
- Promenade n.4 (2011, The Kogart Foundation, Budapest - Hungary)
- Immagini dell'abbandono (2011, Ex Ospedale Neuropsichiatrico di Racconigi - Italy)
- Subversive Intensity of the Image (2011, Gallery 604, Busan - South Korea)
- Fragile, lands of empathy (2009, Musée d'art moderne de Saint-Étienne Métropole e Accademia di Ungheria, Roma - Italy)
- Collectors 1 (2009, Filatoio Rosso di Caraglio - Italy)
- L'immagine come rivelazione (2009, LipanjePuntin artecontemporanea, Trieste - Italy)
- Il volto dell'altro (LipanjePuntin artecontemporanea, Roma - Italy)
- Che peccato tu non possa assistere a questa felicità (2007, Il Fondaco, Bra - Italy)
- RisAlto (2006, Castello di Camino, Casale Monferrato - Italy)
- 20 Proposte XX (2005, Sala Bolaffi di Torino - Italy)
- Genius Loci (2004, Castello Reale di Racconigi - Italy)
- Una vetrina per la videoarte (2005, Archivio Storico Italgas di Torino - Italy)
- Volti (2003, Galleria Il Prisma, Cuneo - Italy)
- La Via del sale (2003, Castello di Saliceto - Italy)
- Finalisti premio internazionale Mastroianni (2003, San Filippo Neri, Torino - Italy)
- L'immagine e la parola (2001, Centro per l'arte contemporanea Luigi Pecci, Prato - Italy).

== Art books ==
- Per Cesare Pavese, Poem by Nico Orengo, watercolors by Ugo Giletta. Printed in 33 copies, The edition number of the book is 7359. July 2008. Edizioni Pulcinoelefante, Osnago (Milano)
- Perché, Poem by Alda Merini, watercolor by Ugo Giletta. Printed in 33 copies, The edition number of the book is 7247. April 2008. Edizioni Pulcinoelefante, Osnago (Milano)
- Incontro, Poem by Giovanni Tesio, watercolors by Ugo Giletta. Printed in 43 copies, The edition number of the book is 6993. Edizioni Pulcinoelefante, Osnago, (Milano)
- Omaggio a G, B. Bodoni, Poem by Nico Orengo, watercolors by Ugo Giletta, Printed in 43 copies, The edition number of the book is 6679. November 2006. Edizioni Pulcinoelefante, Osnago, (Milano)
- Paesaggio, Ugo Giletta, Aquatint, a zinc matrix 255 x 325 mm, hand printed with a star press on Dassel's Hahnemühle round paper in one hundred and ten copies, signed and marked by the artist from 1 to 80 in Arabic numerals and from I to XXX in Roman numerals. There are also some numbered and hand watercolored prints by the artist. After the printing, the plates were punched. Franco Masoero printer in Turin, November 2004.
- Tracce, three unpublished poems by Alda Merini, three watercolors, an acrylic and a drawing by Ugo Giletta. Printed in 35 copies numbered from 1/35 to 35/35 and 20 in Roman numerals numbered from I / XX to XX / XX plus an artist proof. All copies signed by the authors. Dimensions: 28x38.5x4.7 cm. November 2002. Edizioni Canopo, Prato.
- Sogno e Realtà SMENS, biannual of New Woodcut, Rivarolo Canavese, (Torino)
- Il Volto, Poetry by Alda Merini, watercolors by Ugo Giletta. Printed in 33 copies, The edition number of the book is 3748. June 2000. Edizioni Pulcinoelefante, Osnago, (Milano)
- l’Orata, la Triglia, l’Acciuga, 3 nursery rhymes by Nico Orengo, watercolors by Ugo Giletta. Printed in 43 copies, The edition number of the book is 3772. June 2000. Edizioni Pulcinoelefante, Osnago, (Milano)
- Artisti al muro, Posters for April 25, 2000, 99 numbered and signed folders, Edizione Spazioarte, Saluzzo (Cuneo)
- Biblioteca Luisia, Vigone (Torino), Ugo Giletta and Gilberto Zorio, folder of original engravings signed and marked by the artists from 1 to 80 in Arabic numbers and from I to XXX in Roman numbers.

== Other books ==
- Identità in divenire, piccole storie di infinita alterità, with a text by Ivana Mulatero and an interview with Ugo Giletta by Massimo Tantardini, Caraglio, Edizioni Marcovaldo, 2014 ISBN 978-88-88597-42-3
- Immagini dell'abbandono, with texts by Lóránd Hegyi, Giovanni Tesio. Torino, Hapax Editore, 2011 ISBN 978-88-88000-45-9
- Il Volto dell'Altro, with texts by Lorand Hegyi, Nico Orengo, Francesco Tomatis. Brescia, SHIN Production, 2009 ISBN 9788889005 42 2
- Che peccato tu non possa assistere a questa felicità, with texts by Francesco Poli, Nico Orengo, Giovanni Tesio. Bra, Il Fondaco Edizioni, 2007
- Volti, with texts by Sara Abram, Roberto Baravalle, Victor De Circasia, Guido Curto, Giovanni Tesio, Nico Orengo. Cuneo, Edizioni il Prisma, 2001
- Proposte IX, text by Lucio Cabutti, Torino, Edizioni Regione Piemonte, 1993
- Il colore della forma, text by Gerardo Pintus, Cuneo, Quadreria d'arte contemporanea, 1989

== Ugo Giletta in museums ==
=== Permanent collections ===
- Museo d’Arte Contemporanea all'aperto di Piscina To
- Parkview Green Museum, Beijing
- Parkview Museum, Singapore
- GAM, Videoteca, Galleria d’Arte Moderna e Contemporanea di Torino
- VAF-Stiftung. Frankfurt am Main
- Collezione La Gaia, Busca (Cuneo)
- Civica Galleria d'arte contemporanea "Filippo Scroppo" di Torre Pellice
- Le Musée de la Corse, Corte (France)

=== Opere acquisite da musei ===
- Parkview Museum, Singapore
- Parkview Green Museum, Beijing
- Fondazione VAF. Frankfurt-am-Main
- Collezione La Gaia, Busca (Cuneo)
- Le Musée de la Corse, Corte (France)

== Bibliography ==
- Evocation, a Nomadic Exhibition Project. Lorand Hegyi. Nino Argano Editore, 2023 ISBN 978-88-9380-239-0
- Evocation, a Nomadic Exhibition Project. Lorand Hegyi. Nino Argano Editore, 2023 ISBN 978-88-9380-239-0
- Dove finisce l'Italia. Niccolò Zancan. Feltrinelli Editore, 2020 ISBN 978-88-07-17373-8
- Dentro il disegno. Lorand Hegyi.Mondadori Electa S.p.A. Milano, 2019 ISBN 978-88-918-2731-9
- Narratives in Contemporary Art, five essays. Lorand Hegyi. Silvana Editoriale, 2018 ISBN 978-88-366-4247-2
- L'acquerello in Piemonte, dall'Ottocento a oggi. Marcella Pralormo. Daniela Piazza Editore, Torino. 2018 ISBN 978-88-7889-337-5
- Piture Parolà, arte in poesia. Giovanni Tesio, Interlinea Edizioni, Novara, 2018 ISBN 978-88-6857-220-4
- Lorand Hegyi, Nico Orengo e Francesco Tomatis, Il Volto dell'Altro, Brescia, SHIN Production, 2009 ISBN 9788889005 42 2
- Marco Meneguzzo, Le spine della complessità, arte e artisti tra globale e locale, Cuneo, Edizione Primalpe, 2017 ISBN 978-88-6387-275-0
- Lóránd Hegyi, Eugenio Viola, Intrigantes incertitudes, Lione, Fage Éditions, 2016 ISBN 978-2-84975-408-5
- Manuela Galliano, Moving Tales: video works from the La Gaia Collection, Milano, Mousse Publishing, 2016 ISBN 978-88-6749-237-4
- Lóránd Hegyi. Significant uncertainties. Torino, Hapax Editore, 2016 ISBN 978-88-88000-78-7
- Francesco Poli, Ivana Mulatero. Schermi delle mie brame.Torino, Prinp Editore, 2016 ISBN 978-88-97677-39-0
- Guido Curto, Enrica Pagella. Presepio, L'immagine della nativita' dal medioevo all'arte contemporanea. Torino, Edizioni Albertina Press, 2014 ISBN 978-88-909848-9-1
- Lóránd Hegyi, Approcci al sostanziale, la sovranità delle piccole narrazioni. Bra, Edizioni Il Fondaco, 2014
- Roberto Baravalle, Giacomo Doglio, (Im)materiali. Cuneo, Edizioni Primalpe, 2014
- Lóránd Hegyi. Experience of Empathy, accenni metaforici alla fragilità. Bra, Edizioni Il Fondaco, 2013
- Gianfranco Schialvino, Il Gioco. Arte in Piemonte dal 900 a oggi, Bra, Edizione Cassa Risparmio di Bra, 2013
- Lóránd Hegyi, Contemporary Art on Show, Milano, Silvana Editore, 2012 ISBN 978-88-238-4613-5
- Lóránd Hegyi, Giovanni Tesio. Immagini dell'abbandono. Torino, Hapax Editore, 2011 ISBN 978-88-88000-45-9
- Nico Orengo. Il salto dell'acciuga. Torino, Giulio Einaudi Editore, 1997 - 2003 ISBN 978-88-06-16461-4
- Lóránd Hegiy. Three artists of European. Busan (Corea del Sud), Edizione Gallery 604, 2011 ISBN 978-89-94726-08-3
- Guido Curto. La via del sale, omaggio a Nico Orengo, Bra, Il Fondaco Edizioni, 2011 ISBN 88-900544-8-4
- Vittorio Sgarbi. Lo stato dell’Arte. Milano, Edizioni Skira, 2011 ISBN 978-88-572-1374-3
- Catalogo dell’Arte Moderna n. 46, segnalazione di Lea Mattarella, Milano, Cairo Publishing, 2011 ISBN 978-88-6052-321-1
- Lóránd Hegiy. Fragile, Terres d'empathie. Milano, Edizioni Skira, 2009 ISBN 978-88-572-0254-9
- Paola Ballesi. Adriatica. Civitanova Marche, Edizioni Galleria Per Mari e Monti, 2010
- Nico Orengo. Il giocattolaio di Anversa, collana “La favola dell’arte”. Torino, Hopefulmonster Editore, 2002 ISBN 978-88-7757-139-7
- Andrea Busto. Collectors 1, Collezione La Gaia. Caraglio, Edizioni Marcovaldo, 2007 ISBN 88-88597-27-1
- Nico Orengo, Norma Mangione. La bicicletta di Jarry, Torino, Edizione Giampiero Biasutti, 2005
- Guido Curto, Gian Alberto Farinella. 20 Proposte XX. Torino, Edizioni Regione Piemonte, 2005
- Silvana Peira, Nico Orengo. 9 artisti lungo la via del sale. Bra, Il Fondaco Edizioni, 2002 ISBN 978-88-900544-2-6
- Sara Abram, Roberto Baravalle, Victor De Circasia, Guido Curto, Giovanni Tesio, Nico Orengo. Volti, Cuneo, Edizioni il Prisma, 2001
- Nico Orengo, Giuseppe Misuraca. Arte in natura. Torino, Regione Piemonte, 1999 ISBN 88-86041-23-3
- Lucio Cabutti e Enzo De Paoli. La scena muta. Novara, Interlinea edizioni, 1994 ISBN 88-86121-46-6
- Lucio Cabutti, Enzo De Paoli. La realtà replicata. Borgomanero, Edizioni Fondazione Marazza, 1993
- Lucio Cabutti. Fantastica automazione, Borgomanero, Edizioni Fondazione Marazza, 1993
