= Risalto =

RisAlto is an international exposition of contemporary art that was organized annually in the medieval castle of Camino, Piedmont, between 2001 and 2010. The project is an idea of the artists Marco Porta and Mari Brignolo. Risalto was the first modern art exhibition in the world that presented mosaics reproduced exclusively in coloured rice. International artists were invited to design the mosaics, that were then produced by the creators of the event in collaboration with the artists.

== Technique ==
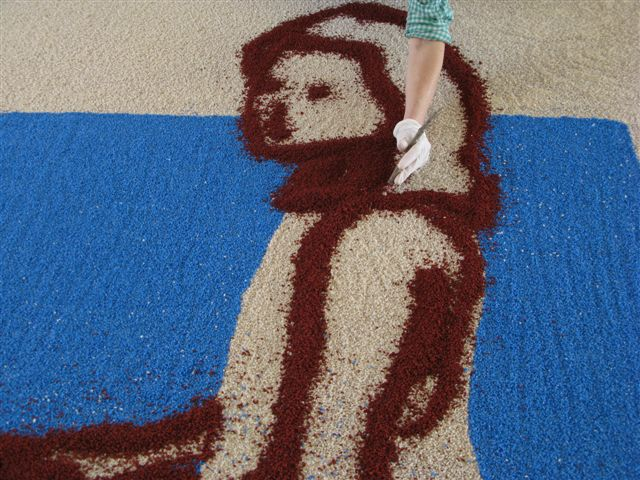
A phase of the creation of a rice mosaic

The production of the mosaic is a long and complicated process that requires precision and patience. Every year the project starts with the invitation of some selected artists, whose task is to create a stub: usually a drawing or a painting or just criteria for the production of the mosaic. The artist's work is then enlarged and copied on the support 2 metres square. The next step is the colouring of the rice, in the various colours and tones needed, dipping it into a bath of aniline, acrylics or enamel paints. Sometimes, to make the final work fit to the original artist's project, it has been necessary to use extraordinary types of colouring (carbon, nacre, glitter). The rice, dried and covered with a protecting varnish, is then stuck on the support. Lastly there is a finer colouring made using brushes or airbrush, or particular colours; sometimes the artists themselves come to refine and complete the work.

== History ==
The project RisAlto started in 2001 from an idea of Mari Brignolo and Marco Porta.

The following artists participated: 2001: Antonella Bersani, Corrado Bonomi, Enrico Colombotto Rosso, Omar Galliani, Marco Lodola, Aldo Mondino, Marco Porta, Antonio Riello, Mauro Staccioli, Vittorio Valente.

2002: Jessica Carroll, Gianni Cella, Enzo Cucchi, Lucio Del Pezzo, Giorgio Griffa, Ugo Nespolo, Alex Pinna, Emilio Tadini, Ben Vautier, Gilberto Zorio.

2003: Sergio Fermariello, Piero Fogliati, Robert Gligorov, Trevor Gould, Luigi Mainolfi, Florencia Martinez, Marcello Morandini, Hidetoshi Nagasawa, Franco Rasma, Luigi Stoisa.

2004: Alberto Biasi, Daniele Galliano, Horacio Garcia Rossi, Julio Le Parc, Emanuele Luzzati, Davide Nido, Concetto Pozzati, Franco Vaccari.

2005: Maurizio Galimberti, Riccardo Licata, Ulrike Lienbacher, Carlo Pasini, Luca Pignatelli, Giovanni Rizzoli, Tino Stefanoni, Icon Tada.

2006: Nicola Carrino, Marco Gastini, Ugo Giletta, Emilio Isgrò, Bruno Peinado, Lucia Pescadòr, Salvo, Francisco Sobrino.

2007. This edition has been organized in honour of artists belonging to Fluxus art current: A.yo, Philip Corner, Al Hansen, Geoffrey Hendricks, Ben Patterson, Takako Saito, Ben Vautier, Emmett Williams.

2008: Valerio Berruti, Mirco Marchelli, Gino Marotta, Simone Pellegrini, Olga Carol Rama, Pino Spagnulo, Silvio Wolf, Michele Zaza.

2009: Getulio Alviani, Eugenio Carmi, Chéri Cherin, Nunzio, Antonio Paradiso, Luca Maria Patella, Piero Pizzi Cannella, Antonio Recalcati.

2010: Gianni Caravaggio, Enrico Castellani, Hsiao Chin, Tamara Ferioli, Giuseppe Gallo, Marco Tirelli, Walter Valentini, Grazia Varisco.

== Bibliography ==
- Maurizio Sciaccaluga, Risalto 1, Teograf, Corsico, 2001
- Mariateresa Cerretelli, Risalto 2, Teograf, Corsico, 2002
- Mariateresa Cerretelli, Risalto 3, Teograf, Corsico, 2003
- AA.VV., Risalto 4, Diffusioni Grafiche, Villanova Monferrato, 2004
- AA.VV., Risalto 5, Diffusioni Grafiche, Villanova Monferrato, 2005
- Giovanni Granzotto, Giovanna Barbero, Horacio Garcia Rossi Dipinti, Verso l’arte edizioni, 2005
- AA.VV., Risalto 6, Diffusioni Grafiche, Villanova Monferrato, 2006
- Giovanna Barbero, Giovanni Granzotto, Ben Ormenese Francisco Sobrino, Verso l’arte edizioni, 2006.
- AA.VV., Risalto 7, Diffusioni Grafiche, Villanova Monferrato, 2007
- AA.VV., Risalto 8, Diffusioni Grafiche, Villanova Monferrato, 2008
- AA.VV., Risalto 9, Diffusioni Grafiche, Villanova Monferrato, 2009
- AA.VV., Risalto 10, Diffusioni Grafiche, Villanova Monferrato, 2010

== Press ==
- ROBERTO ROSSI, Andar per (bric e foss), in Panorama, 16 maggio 2001.
- SABINA SPADA, Riso e ironia. Undici dipinti commestibili, in Arte, ottobre 2001.
- SILVIA BOMBELLI, Per un pugno di riso, in Panorama, 23 maggio 2002.
- ELISABETTA CANORO, Che cosa c’è in Palio?, in In Viaggio, ottobre. 2002
- Nel Monferrato tra mercatini e appuntamenti d’arte, in Corriere della Sera, 4 maggio 2003
- Il riso e le rose per una kermesse di fiori e sapori, in La Repubblica, 17 maggio 2003
- SILVANA MOSSANO, Riso con i petali di rose alla kermesse di maggio, in La Stampa, 28 aprile 2005
- MARIATERESA CERRETELLI, e il riso si trasforma in mosaici d’artista, in Class, luglio 2008.
