= Parthenope (siren) =

One of the sirens in Greek mythology

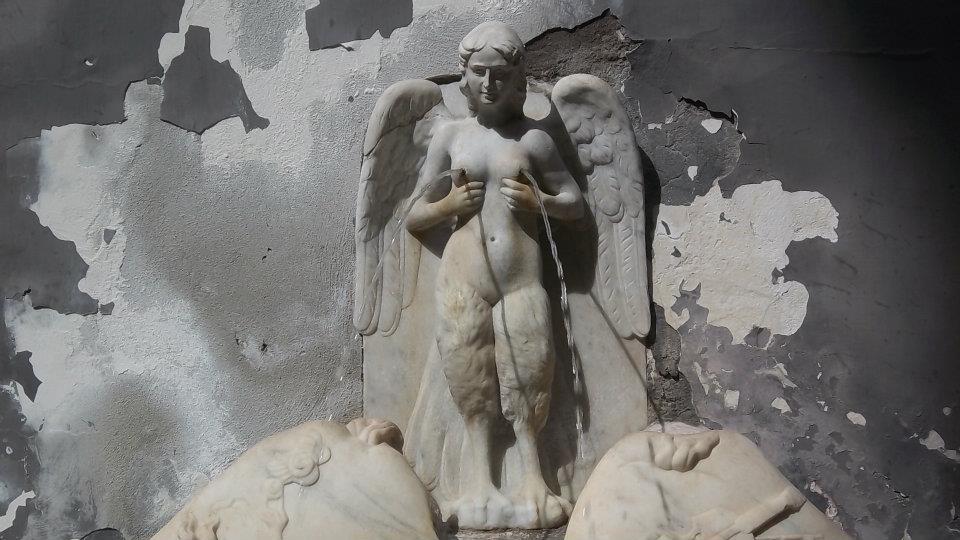
- The Fountain of the Spinacorona, a depiction of Parthenope in Naples, Italy

Creature information
- Grouping: Mythological
- Sub grouping: Siren
- Family: Child of Achelous and Terpsichore
- Folklore: Greek

Origin
- Country: Greece
- Region: Sirenum Scopuli
- Habitat: Seagirt meadows

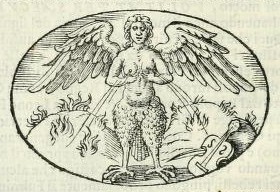
Illustration of Parthenope from the Delle imprese trattato by Julius Caesar Capaccio

Parthenope (Ancient Greek: Παρθενόπη, romanized: Parthenopē) was one of the sirens in Greek mythology. Her name means 'maiden-voiced' from parthenos (παρθένος, meaning fig. 'maiden/virgin') and ops (ὄψ, meaning 'appearance').

== Family ==
Parthenope was the daughter of the God Achelous and the Muse Terpsichore. Her two sisters were called Ligeia, and Leucosia.

== Mythology ==
According to Greek legend, Parthenope cast herself into the sea and drowned when her songs failed to entice Odysseus. Her body washed ashore at Naples, on the island of Megaride, where the Castel dell'Ovo is now located. Her tomb on the island was called "constraction of sirens". When people from the city of Cumae settled there, they named their city Parthenope in her honour.

A Roman myth tells a different version of the tale, in which a centaur named Vesuvius was enamored with Parthenope. Angered, Jupiter turned the centaur into a stratovolcano and Parthenope into the city of Naples. Thwarted in his desire, Vesuvius' rage is manifested in the volcano's frequent violent eruptions.

== In literature and art ==
Parthenope has been depicted in various forms of literature and art, from ancient coins that bore her semblance to the Fountain of the Spinacorona, where she is depicted quenching the fires of Vesuvius with water from her breasts. In his Georgics, Virgil stated that he had been nurtured by Parthenope, writing:

At that time sweet Parthenope was nurturing me, Virgil, as I flourished in the pursuits of my inglorious leisure...

— Virgil, Georgics

In addition, Parthenope has served as the inspiration for several other works, such as Manuel de Zumaya's Partenope and the ancient Greek novel Mētiokhos kai Parthenopē. Also, several operas based on the myth of Parthenope were composed on the 18th century by Sarro (1722), Vinci (1725), Handel (1730), Vivaldi (1738) and Hasse (1767). The poem An Afternoon in Naples at the Time of Bomba by Herman Melville cites Parthenope as a source of Naples' mythological identity. Ennio Morricone composed an opera based on the legend of Parthenope in 1995, which was premiered in 2025 as part of the celebrations surrounding the 2,500th anniversary of the founding of Naples.

== Bibliography ==
- John Tzetzes, Book of Histories, Book I translated by Ana Untila from the original Greek of T. Kiessling's edition of 1826. Online version at theio.com.
- Lycophron, The Alexandra. Translated by Alexander William Mair. Loeb Classical Library Volume 129. London: William Heinemann, 1921. Online version at the Topos Text Project.
- Lycophron, Alexandra. Translated by A.W. Mair. London: William Heinemann; New York: G.P. Putnam's Sons. 1921. Greek text available at the Perseus Digital Library.
- Strabo, The Geography of Strabo. Edited by H.L. Jones. Cambridge, Mass.: Harvard University Press; London: William Heinemann, Ltd. 1924. Online version at the Perseus Digital Library.
- Strabo, Geographica. Edited by A. Meineke. Leipzig: Teubner. 1877. Greek text available at the Perseus Digital Library.
