= Partenope (Morricone) =

1995 opera by Ennio Morricone

- Opera by Ennio Morricone
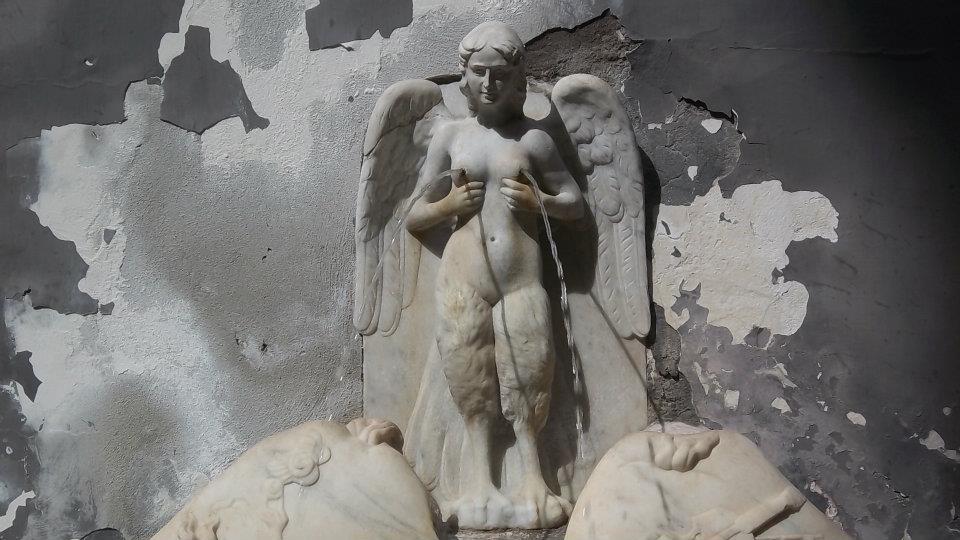
- The Fountain of the Spinacorona, a depiction of Parthenope in Naples, Italy
- Other title: Musica per la sirena di Napoli ("Music for the siren of Naples")
- Librettist: Guido Barbieri and Sandro Cappelletto
- Language: Italian, Neapolitan, Greek
- Based on: The legend of Parthenope and the founding of Naples
- Premiere: 12 December 2025; Teatro di San Carlo, Naples

Partenope is an opera in one act with music by Ennio Morricone to a libretto by Guido Barbieri and Sandro Cappelletto. Its subject is the legend from Greek Mythology of the siren Parthenope. After failing to lure Odysseus to his death, Parthenope drowned herself. Her body washed ashore in Southern Italy, where Greek colonists founded a city named in her honor. That city would eventually become Naples. The opera was written and composed in 1995, but was first premiered on December 12, 2025, five years after Morricone's death. The libretto utilizes three languages: Italian for the named roles, Neapolitan for the narrator, and Ancient Greek for the chorus.

== Composition and premiere ==
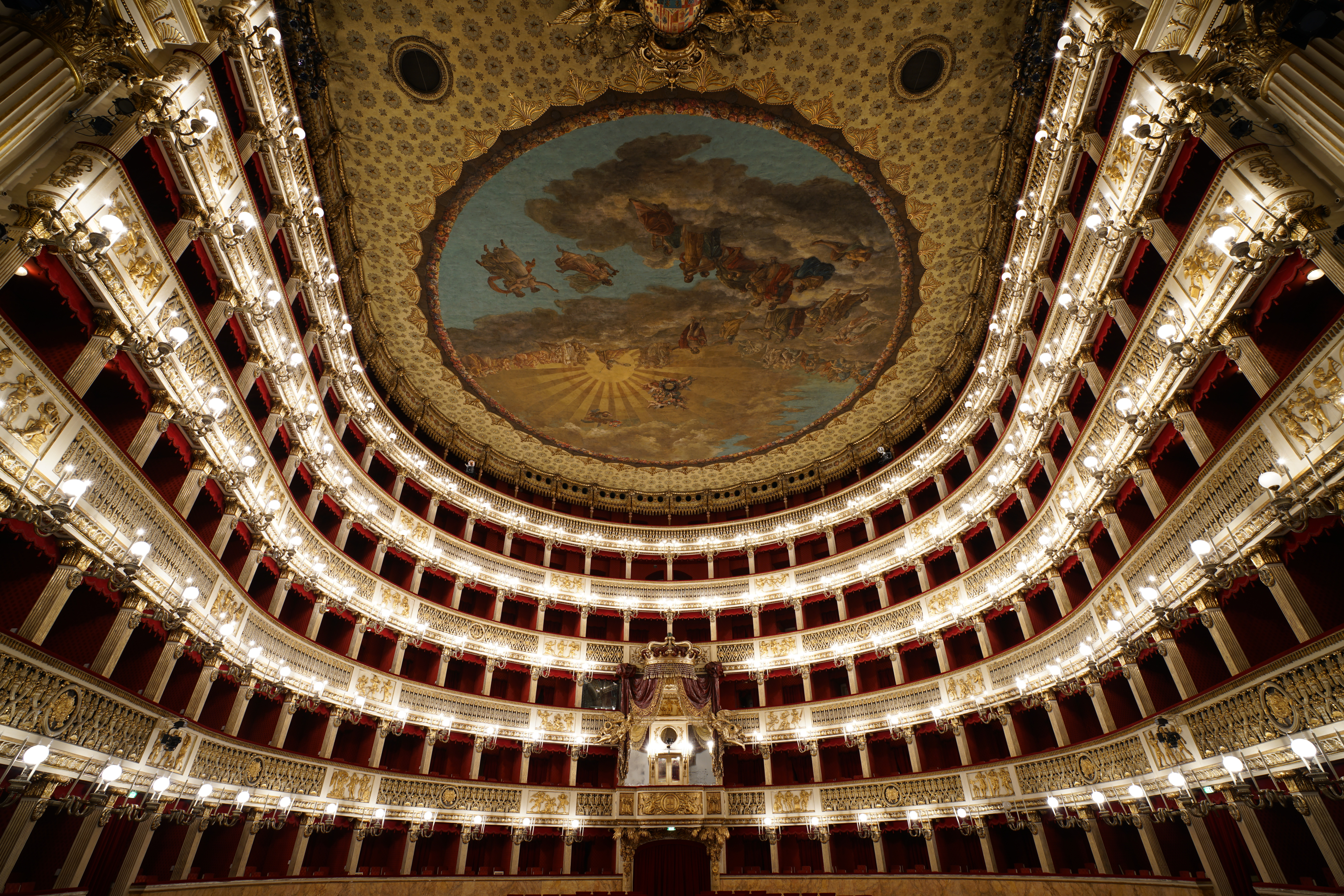
Interior view of the Teatro di San Carlo, where the opera was premiered

The opera was commissioned in 1995 for a festival in Campania. However, the festival did not end up happening. The opera premiered on 12 December 2025, the year Naples celebrated 2,500 years since its founding. The premiere starred Jessica Pratt in the role of Partenope 1, Maria Agresta in the role of Partenope 2, Désirée Giove in the role of Persefone, Francesco Demuro in the role of Melanio, and Mimmo Borrelli in the role of the Narrator. The premiere was directed by Vanessa Beecroft and conducted by Riccardo Frizza.

== Score ==
The score calls for mostly wind instruments, with no violins. Additionally, the score utilizes percussion instruments used in Neapolitan folk music, including tammorra and tamburello (variations of tambourine), and putipù. Morricone drew on the modal music of Ancient Greece for the score.
