= Rosmonda d'Inghilterra =

Opera by Gaetano Donizetti

- Opera by Gaetano Donizetti
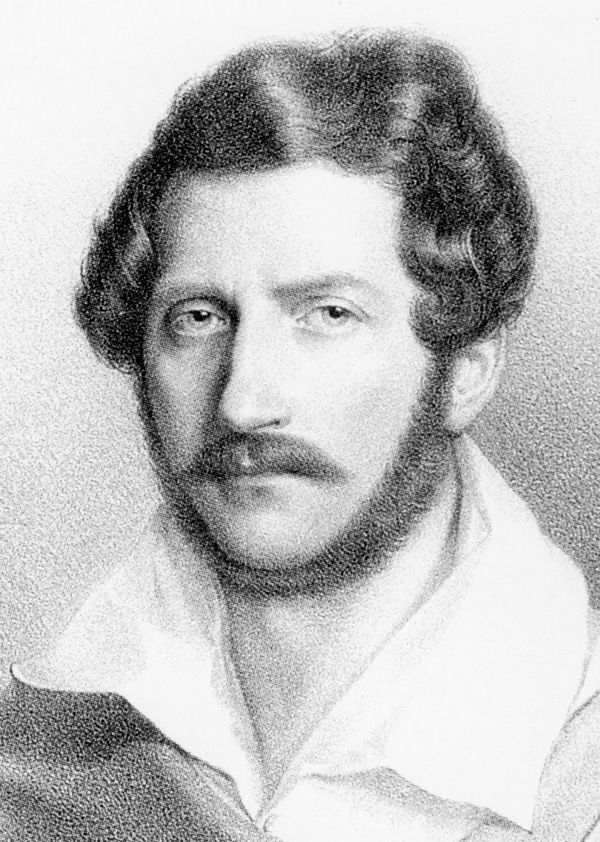
- Gaetano Donizetti c. 1835
- Librettist: Felice Romani
- Language: Italian
- Based on: Legend of Rosamund Clifford
- Premiere: 27 February 1834; Teatro della Pergola, Florence

Rosmonda d'Inghilterra (Rosamund of England) is a melodramma or opera in two acts by Gaetano Donizetti. The Italian libretto was written by Felice Romani originally for Coccia's Rosmunda (1829). It is based on the legend of Rosamund Clifford (The Fair Rosamund).

== Performance history ==
It premiered at the Teatro della Pergola, Florence on 27 February 1834 and was revived only in Livorno in 1845. A request for it to be approved for the Teatro di San Carlo in Naples was submitted in June 1837 and it was revised as Eleonora di Gujenna for that theatre, but there is no evidence that it was actually performed there.

It was largely forgotten until its English rediscovery in 1975 by Patric Schmid, co-founder of Opera Rara, who recognised Donizetti's handwriting by chance on the manuscript in the library of the Naples Conservatory. A concert performance was given at the Queen Elizabeth Hall, London with Yvonne Kenny in the title role, and later a recording followed.

The opera was given a production at the Donizetti Festival, Bergamo, in 2016.

== Roles ==
| Role | Voice type | Premiere Cast, 27 February 1834 (Conductor: - ) |
|---|---|---|
| Rosmonda Clifford, Clifford's daughter | soprano | Fanny Tacchinardi Persiani |
| Eleonora di Guienna | soprano | Anna del Sere |
| Enrico II, King of England | tenor | Gilbert Duprez |
| Arturo, Enrico's page | contralto | Giuseppina Merola |
| Clifford, old governor | bass | Carlo Porto Ottolini |
Officials, councilmen, pages, soldiers

== Synopsis ==
Time: Second half of 12th century
Place: In and near Woodstock Castle, England

=== Act 1 ===
Scene 1

In the Woodstock Castle park, the country-folk acclaim Enrico (King Henry II) upon his return from his wars in Ireland. As they greet him, Leonora (Queen Eleanor) appears, followed by the King's page, Arturo. It is revealed that Arturo was once taken under Leonora's protection as a young orphan, and consequently feels deeply indebted to her. As a result of these feelings, he has told her a powerful secret: that Enrico has a mistress, and that upon his departure for Ireland he lodged her in a tower at Woodstock and left Arturo to watch over her. Her identity is so secretive that even Arturo does not know her name. Leonora realizes that the page has fallen in love with this mysterious woman. Leonora encourages him by suggesting that she will help him win her for himself, but at the same time she clearly seeks revenge upon her rival.

Leonora and Arturo retire as the country-folk return, strewing flowers in Enrico's path. The King is delighted to lay down his arms and looks forward to returning to his love. Before he can depart, however, he is accosted by his elderly tutor, Clifford. It is an unwelcome and embarrassing encounter, since his mistress is Clifford's own daughter, Rosmonda. Clifford, for his part, is unaware of his daughter's predicament since he has been absent on a diplomatic mission in France, and believes that she is at home awaiting his return. He has, however, heard rumours that the King has deserted Leonora and taken a mistress, and in his capacity as the King's mentor he takes it upon himself to rebuke Enrico. He demands to see the unfortunate woman, whoever she may be, in order that he may try to lead her back to virtue. Enrico allows him to see her, though he urges him to be guided by compassion, and assures him that, once he knows her identity, he will be pleased to see her mount the throne of England.

Scene 2

Rosmonda is alone in her tower. It has been three months since her lover, whom she knows only as ‘Edegardo’, went away, leaving her in Arturo's care. Her lover's absence has made Rosmonda miss Edegardo's company even more, but it has also given her time to appreciate the enormity of her conduct. She is now torn between love and remorse. As she accompanies herself upon her harp, and sings of her sorrows, Arturo from the gardens beneath echoes her song in sympathy.

Arturo brings news of her lover's return, but adds that ‘concerns of the King’ keep him from her yet a while. In the meantime, permission has been given for an elderly knight to wait upon her. Rosmonda is horrified to hear that her visitor is none other than Clifford, her father, and she confesses her identity to Arturo. But she has no time to escape: taken by surprise and utterly unprepared, she finds herself alone with her father. For a moment Clifford fails to recognize her, but then, the full situation dawning upon him, he bitterly reproaches her, and is only prevented from cursing her by her distress and evident remorse. Now Rosmonda learns her lover's identity for the first time, and when Enrico himself is heard, calling to her, she faints.

Enrico is distressed to see Rosmonda's plight, and all the more so since, as she recovers consciousness, she bids him to leave her and return to Leonora. At this point Leonora also appears, accompanied by the whole court. She feigns surprise, asking why she should find everyone so obviously embarrassed: the King looking angrily upon her, Clifford disturbed, and Rosmonda in tears. Clifford presents his daughter, and beseeches the Queen to take her under her protection. Leonora agrees to do so, but Enrico, suspecting her malignant intentions, intervenes and, informing her that her reign is over, bids her be gone. The act ends in hostility.

=== Act 2 ===
Scene 1

The great hall of Woodstock Castle. Enrico's councillors reluctantly agree that, if his marriage is so irksome to him, he should divorce Leonora. He replies that she is more dangerous to him in England than in her own Aquitania, and orders that she should be sent back to France the next day.

Leonora herself, however, is determined not to be disposed of so easily. As the councillors retire, she waylays Enrico and tries, first by reasoned argument, reminding him of the aid she gave him in gaining the throne, and then by seeking to reawaken his love, to win her way back into his heart. He remains impervious to her wiles, and their encounter ends in threats and recrimination.

Scene 2

A gallery in Rosmonda's tower. Arturo, alone, expresses his love for Rosmonda, but fears that, since he is a mere page, his love is no match for that of the King. He regrets that he has allowed himself to become a tool of the Queen, but sees no help for it: he is too deeply indebted to her and too involved to have second thoughts.

Hearing a knocking at a secret door and believing it to be the Queen, he opens it. To his surprise he finds that it is Clifford, who, imprisoned by Enrico but released by Leonora, has come to tell Rosmonda that she must leave England within the hour. It is Clifford's wish that Arturo escort her to Aquitania and marry her. The proposal surprises Arturo quite as much as it does Rosmonda. Though Rosmonda agrees to leave Enrico, she at first pleads against any alternative marriage; but then, urged by both Clifford and Arturo, she eventually capitulates and agrees to all her father's wishes.

Left alone, Rosmonda is found by Enrico. He attempts to win her over by informing her that the Councillors have agreed to their marriage. The whole kingdom, he assures her, will welcome her as queen. Rosmonda remains adamant, insisting that she can never be queen: he is already married to Leonora, and she has now sworn to leave him forever. As the hour strikes, she tears herself away from him.

Scene 3

In a remote regions of the gardens of Woodstock, Rosmonda has agreed to meet Arturo so that they may set off together for Aquitaine. Leonora's followers are on the watch to see whether she will keep her promise, and hide in the shadows as she does so. Rosmonda is surprised to find that she is the first to arrive, and wonders what has kept Arturo. She hears someone approaching, but it is instead the Queen. Leonora accuses her of fleeing to the King since there are so many guards nearby and brandishes a dagger. Rosmonda pleads her innocence, insisting that she is here only in fulfilment of her father's wishes that she should leave England forever. Leonora appears to be almost convinced, but at this unlucky moment her followers return, informing her that an armed Enrico and his henchmen are approaching. In panic and despair, Leonora stabs Rosmonda. As Enrico and Clifford arrive, Rosmonda falls dying into their arms.

A distraught and anguished Leonora reproaches Enrico for forcing her to such an extreme: it is he, she insists, who is ultimately to blame, although both of them must be punished by Heaven's vengeance.

== Recordings ==
| Year | Cast: (Rosmonda Clifford, Leonora di Guienna, Enrico II, Arturo, Clifford) | Conductor, Opera House and Orchestra | Label |
|---|---|---|---|
| 1975 | Yvonne Kenny, Ludmilla Andrew, Richard Greager, Enid Hartle, Christian du Plessis | Alun Francis, Ulster Orchestra and Chorus of the Northern Ireland Opera Trust (Recording of a performance given by Opera Rara at the Queen's University Festival, Belfast, 22 November) | 33rpm LP: Unique Opera Records Corporation; Cat: UORC 274 |
| 1994 | Renée Fleming, Nelly Miricioiu, Bruce Ford, Diana Montague, Alastair Miles | David Parry, Philharmonia Orchestra and Geoffrey Mitchell Choir | Audio CD: Opera Rara; Cat: ORC 13 |
| 2017 | Jessica Pratt, Eva Mei, Dario Schmunck, Raffaella Lupinacci, Nicola Ulivieri | Sebastiano Rolli, Donizetti Opera orchestra and chorus | CD:Dynamic; Cat:CDS7757 |
