= Jessica Pratt (soprano) =

Australian coloratura soprano (born 1979)

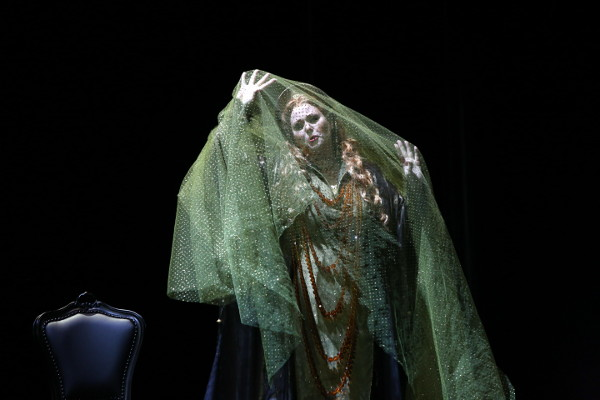
- Pratt as Donizetti's Rosmonda d'Inghilterra, 2016
- Born: 20 June 1979 (age 47); Bristol, United Kingdom
- Education: Accademia Nazionale di Santa Cecilia
- Occupation: Operatic soprano
- Years active: 2007–present
- Website: en.jessicapratt.com

Jessica Pratt (born 20 June 1979) is an English-born Australian operatic coloratura soprano. Trained in Italy, Pratt is most recognised for her portrayal of Lucia in Donizetti's Lucia di Lammermoor, which she has performed over 100 times worldwide.

== Early life ==
Pratt was born in Bristol on 20 June 1979. She has lived in Australia since 1991. As a child, she was taught how to sing by her father Philip Pratt (1954-2025), a tenor singer and director of music at Trinity Grammar School in Sydney. She began studying the trumpet for ten years before concentrating her studies on singing. In 2003, she won the Australian Singing Competition, which brought her to Europe, and she was subsequently invited by Gianluigi Gelmetti to continue her studies at the Rome Opera. While in Rome, she also studied under Renata Scotto at the Accademia Nazionale di Santa Cecilia, finally moving to Milan in 2006 to complete her studies with Lella Cuberli.

She made it to the final 40 out of 2000 selected for a place in the 2000 finals of Placido Domingo’s competition Operalia in Paris. Pratt received numerous scholarships to study internationally and has attended a course at the Bel Canto School at Florence.

== Career ==
During the early years of her career, she performed in many smaller venues, examples being her Lucia in several Italian houses, including those in Pavia and Cremona (October 2007), then Zürich Opera House in late 2008, Florence in early 2009, and in Geneva in March 2010. Other roles taken up during these years included Desdemona in Verdi's Otello in July 2008, and Gilda in Rigoletto in Como one year later. She appeared as Amina in Bellini's La sonnambula in Como, St. Gallen, Pavia, and Cremona in October/November 2010, followed by a run of Elvira in Doizetti's I puritani in four smaller Italian houses in October 2010/11.

Pratt has also performed in international opera theatres and festivals including La Scala where she first sang in Donizetti's Le convenienze ed inconvenienze teatrali in 2011. Performances elsewhere have included those at the Teatro San Carlo (Lucia in 2011), the Rossini Opera Festival in Pesaro, Maggio Musicale Fiorentino, the Teatro La Fenice (with a Lucia in May/June 2011 and some performances as Elvira in May 2012), as well as the Vienna State Opera. Other European venues include the Deutsche Oper Berlin and the Royal Opera House, Covent Garden, (as Mozart's Queen of the Night) in February 2011 under Colin Davis.

In 2012 she appeared in the international television broadcast of the New Year's Day concert at Teatro La Fenice in Venice.

She has collaborated with conductors such as Daniel Oren, Kent Nagano, Ralf Weikart, Donato Renzetti, Vladimir Ashkenazy, Wayne Marshall, Christian Thielemann, David Parry and Nello Santi.

In May 2013 Pratt received the Italian award, La Siola d'Oro, for coloratura sopranos in honour of Italian soprano Lina Pagliughi (1907–1980).

Performances in 2014 included Lucia at La Scala (February) followed by the same role in Amsterdam, Violetta in Verdi's La traviata in Melbourne in May, and Donna Anna in Mozart's Don Giovanni at La Fenice. 2015 brought a return to the role of Lucia for the Festival Internacional de Opera Alejandro Granda in Lima, Peru. At the opera houses of Rome and Florence, her role debut as Semiramide in Marseille and later in Washington DC, her debut at the Arena di Verona as Rosina in Rossini's Il barbiere di Siviglia and her role debut as Amenaide in Tancredi in Lausanne, among others.

The 2016 performances included her debut at the Gran Teatre del Liceu in Barcelona as Desdemona in Rossini's Otello, her debut at the ABAO Bilbao in La sonnambula, followed by performances of her highly acclaimed Lucia di Lammermoor held for Teatro Regio di Torino and Victorian Opera in Melbourne. The year also marked the addition of two new Donizetti operas to her repertoire with Linda di Chamounix performed for Teatro dell'Opera di Roma and Rosmonda d'Inghilterra first premiered in Florence with Maggio Musicale in concert form and then fully staged for the new Donizetti Festival in Bergamo. Finally, she completed the year performing the role of the Queen of the Night in The Magic Flute for her debut at the Metropolitan Opera in New York on Christmas and New Year's Eve.

2017 was opened with Verdi's Rigoletto for Opera de Oviedo in Spain where she performed during the year in Las Palmas (debuting La fille du régiment), Valencia (Tancredi), Bilbao (Don Pasquale), Barcelona (debuting L'elisir d'amore) and a tour in Finland for the Savonlinna Opera Festival with Madrid's Teatro Real (I puritani).

Scheduled staged performances include Verdi's La traviata conducted by Roberto Abbado in Shanghai performed in February, La sonnambula in Melbourne with Victorian Opera, I puritani in Budapest and Le comte Ory in Dortmund. Other performances worth mentioning include a special concert with extracts from The Magic Flute to be held at the Walt Disney Concert Hall in Los Angeles, conducted by Gustavo Dudamel.

2018 marked her return to the New York Metropolitan with the title role of Lucia di Lammermoor and a special concert performance of Lucia di Lammermoor, conducted by Roberto Abbado on 12 September for the 40-year commemoration of the death of Maria Callas, to open the season for Théâtre des Champs-Élysées in Paris.

In 2020, Pratt debuted in the role of Zerbinetta in Ariadne auf Naxos, in the 1912 original version and sung in Italian, at the Festival della Valle d'Itria.

In 2025, Pratt performed the role of Partenope 1 at the posthumous premiere of Ennio Morricone's only operatic work, Partenope.

=== Rossini roles and premieres ===
In addition to appearances in operas by Rossini, such as her 2010 performances as Desdemona in the composer's Otello at the Rossini in Wildbad Festival, Pratt has been featured in significant premieres of two of the composer's rarer works. These include the title role in Armida in its United Kingdom premiere in 2010 and, two years later, the United States premiere of Ciro in Babilonia.

Armida was given by the Garsington Opera Festival in 2010, where critic Andrew Clark noted: "what sets the performance alight is Jessica Pratt's Armida. This young English soprano has a ringing top, good looks, stage temperament and enough vocal agility to make sense of Rossini's love-struck heroine."

Another critic, Robert Farr, reviewing the same production, notes:

As Armida, hers was the most amazing vocal performance of the evening. The role is one of the several manifestly vocally difficult and demanding ones that Rossini wrote for his mistress, and later wife, Isabella Colbran, one of the most renowned divas of the day. Not only are its vocal demands considerable, but also it is a very big sing too concluding with the final display aria demanded by all singers in Rossini's time to finish off the performance ... [L]ike the rest of the audience, I appreciated the fact that she sang it with musicality, clarity of diction and purity and beauty of tone, all allied to the smooth vocal extension and flexibility evident throughout her whole performance.

Then, in 2012, Pratt sang the role of Amira in Ciro in Babilonia at the Caramoor Belcanto Festival which resulted in The New York Times critic, Anthony Tommasini, noting that "the soprano Jessica Pratt was also outstanding as Amira, singing with gleaming sound, free and easy high notes, agile coloratura runs and lyrical grace." This production went on to be presented by the same cast at the following month's Rossini Opera Festival in Pesaro where it was recorded.

Prior to this, in 2011 at the same Rossini Festival, Pratt had performed the title role in the second staged production of Adelaide di Borgogna since 1825. In another Rossini role, March 2013 was given over to Matilde in Guillaume Tell at Opera Festival Alejandro Granda in Lima, Peru.

== Repertoire ==
Composer	Opera	Role
Bellini, V.	I Capuleti e i Montecchi	Giulietta
Bellini, V.	I puritani	Elvira
Bellini, V.	La sonnambula	Amina
Bellini, V.	Norma	Norma
Bellini, V.	La Straniera	Alaide
Bellini, V.	Beatrice di Tenda	Beatrice di Tenda
Bernstein, L.	Candide	Cunegonde
Donizetti, G.	Le convenienze ed inconvenienze teatrali	Daria
Donizetti, G.	Linda di Chamounix	Linda
Donizetti, G.	Lucia di Lammermoor	Lucia
Donizetti, G.	Rosmonda d'Inghilterra	Rosmonda
Donizetti, G.	Lucrezia Borgia	Lucrezia Borgia
Donizetti, G.	Il castello di Kenilworth	Elisabetta
Donizetti, G.	L'elisir d'amore	Adina
Donizetti, G.	Roberto Devereux	Elisabetta I
Donizetti, G.	La fille du régiment	Marie
Donizetti, G.	Don Pasquale	Norina
Gounod, C.	Roméo et Juliette	Juliette
Halévy, F.	La Juive	Eudoxie
Händel, G. F.	Giulio Cesare	Cleopatra
Meyerbeer, G.	L'Africaine	Inès
Massenet, J.	Cendrillon	La Fée
Mercadante, S.	Francesca da Rimini	Francesca da Rimini
Morricone, E.	Partenope	Partenope 1
Mozart, W. A.	Die Zauberflöte	Königin der Nacht
Mozart, W. A.	Don Giovanni	Donna Anna
Mozart, W. A.	Il re pastore	Aminta
Mozart, W. A.	Die Entführung aus dem Serail	Konstanze
Mozart, W. A.	Mitridate, re di Ponto	Aspasia
Puccini, G.	La bohème	Musetta
Rossini, G.	Adelaide di Borgogna	Adelaide
Rossini, G.	Armida	Armida
Rossini, G.	Aureliano in Palmira	Zenobia
Rossini, G.	Ciro in Babilonia	Amira
Rossini, G.	Demetrio e Polibio	Lisinga
Rossini, G.	William Tell	Matilde
Rossini, G.	Il barbiere di Siviglia	Rosina
Rossini, G.	Il signor Bruschino	Sofia
Rossini, G.	Otello	Desdemona
Rossini, G.	Semiramide	Semiramide
Rossini, G.	Tancredi	Amenaide
Rossini, G.	Bianca e Falliero	Bianca
Rossini, G.	Il viaggio a Reims	Contessa di Folleville
Rossini, G.	Le Comte Ory	Comtesse Adèle de Formoutiers
Offenbach, J.	Tales of Hoffmann	The Four Heroines (Stella, Olimpia, Antonia and Giulietta)
Strauss R.	Ariadne auf Naxos	Zerbinetta
Vaccai, N.	La sposa di Messina	Donna Isabella
Verdi, G.	Giovanna d'Arco	Giovanna
Verdi, G.	La traviata	Violetta Valéry
Verdi, G.	Rigoletto	Gilda
Wagner R.	Parsifal	Flowermaiden

== Recordings ==
Audio

- Serenade Solo album (Opus Arte)
- Rossini Otello Wildbad (Naxos)
- Vaccai La sposa di Messina Wildbad (Naxos)
- A Guided Tour of the Romantic Era Vol. 3 (Naxos)
- Bel Canto Bully (Naxos)

Video

- Donizetti Le convenienze ed inconvenienze teatrali Teatro alla Scala (Belair Classiques)
- Bellini La Sonnambula Teatro La Fenice (Betafilm)
- Rossini Adelaide di Borgogna Rossini Opera Festival (Arthaus Musik)
- Rossini Ciro in Babilonia Rossini Opera Festival (Opus Arte)
- Teatro La Fenice New Years Concert 2012 (Arthaus Musik)
