= Fanny Tacchinardi Persiani =

Italian soprano (1812–1867)

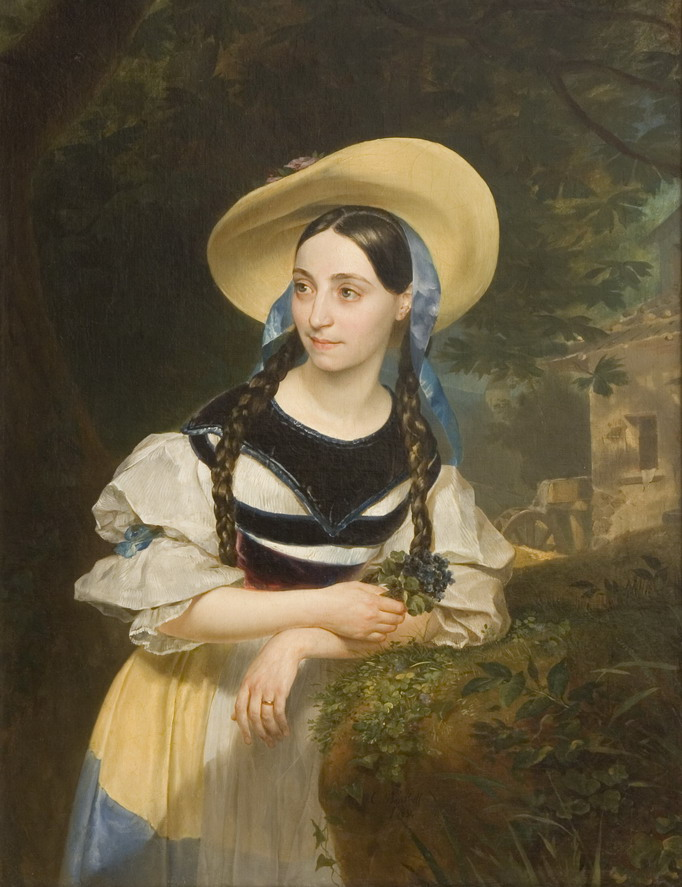
Fanny Tacchinardi Persiani as Amina in Bellini's opera La Sonnambula. Portrait by Karl Bryullov, 1834.

Fanny Tacchinardi Persiani (Italian pronunciation: [ˈfanni takkiˈnardi perˈsjaːni]) (4 October 1812 – 3 May 1867) was an Italian soprano particularly associated with bel canto composers, such as Rossini, Donizetti, Bellini, and early Verdi. Her 'golden' period in Paris and London was between 1837 and 1848.

== Life and career ==
Born in Rome as Francesca Felicita Maria Tacchinardi, she was the daughter of cellist and tenor Nicola Tacchinardi, a very eminent teacher of vocal technique who trained her voice from childhood, and his first wife, Maria Angiola Tacchinardi, a relative. She had two older siblings, Carolina and Ulisse and a younger sibling, Enrichetta "Elisa". She was the half-sister of Guido Tacchinardi who was born from her father's third marriage. In 1830 she married the composer Giuseppe Persiani (1799–1869), and as she embarked on her stage career she added his surname to her own. She made her stage début at Livorno in Giuseppe Fournier-Gorre's Francesca da Rimini in 1832. She soon appeared in Venice, Florence, Milan, Naples, and other Italian cities, in Tancredi, La gazza ladra, Il pirata, L'elisir d'amore and other operas.

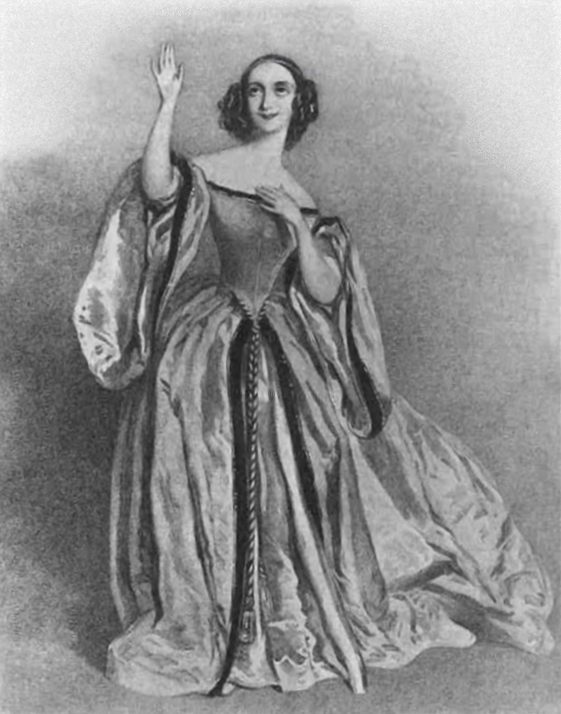
Fanny Tacchinardi Persiani as Lucia in the London premiere of Lucia di Lammermoor

Donizetti heard her in 1833, and described her voice as "rather cold, but quite accurate and perfectly in tune." He chose her to create title roles in three of his operas, Rosmonda d'Inghilterra with Gilbert Duprez as Enrico II (at Florence in February 1834), Pia de' Tolomei (Venice, 1837, a work conceived expressly for her from the beginning), but most notably that of Lucia in Lucia di Lammermoor in Naples in 1835, one of the immortal roles of Romantic opera. Duprez was her Edgardo. Donizetti (remarking that she was "not the brightest star") told in a letter how in rehearsal she made an almighty row (which terrified Duprez) because, after Lucia's finale (the Mad Scene) there remained the finale of Edgardo ('Fra poco a me ricovero') before the curtain fell, displacing the final applause from herself to the tenor. She also sang Lucia in the first Paris performance, in December 1837, opposite Rubini (for whom Edgardo became one of his most celebrated roles), a performance received with acclaim bordering on hysteria. She was furthermore in the London premiere in April 1838.

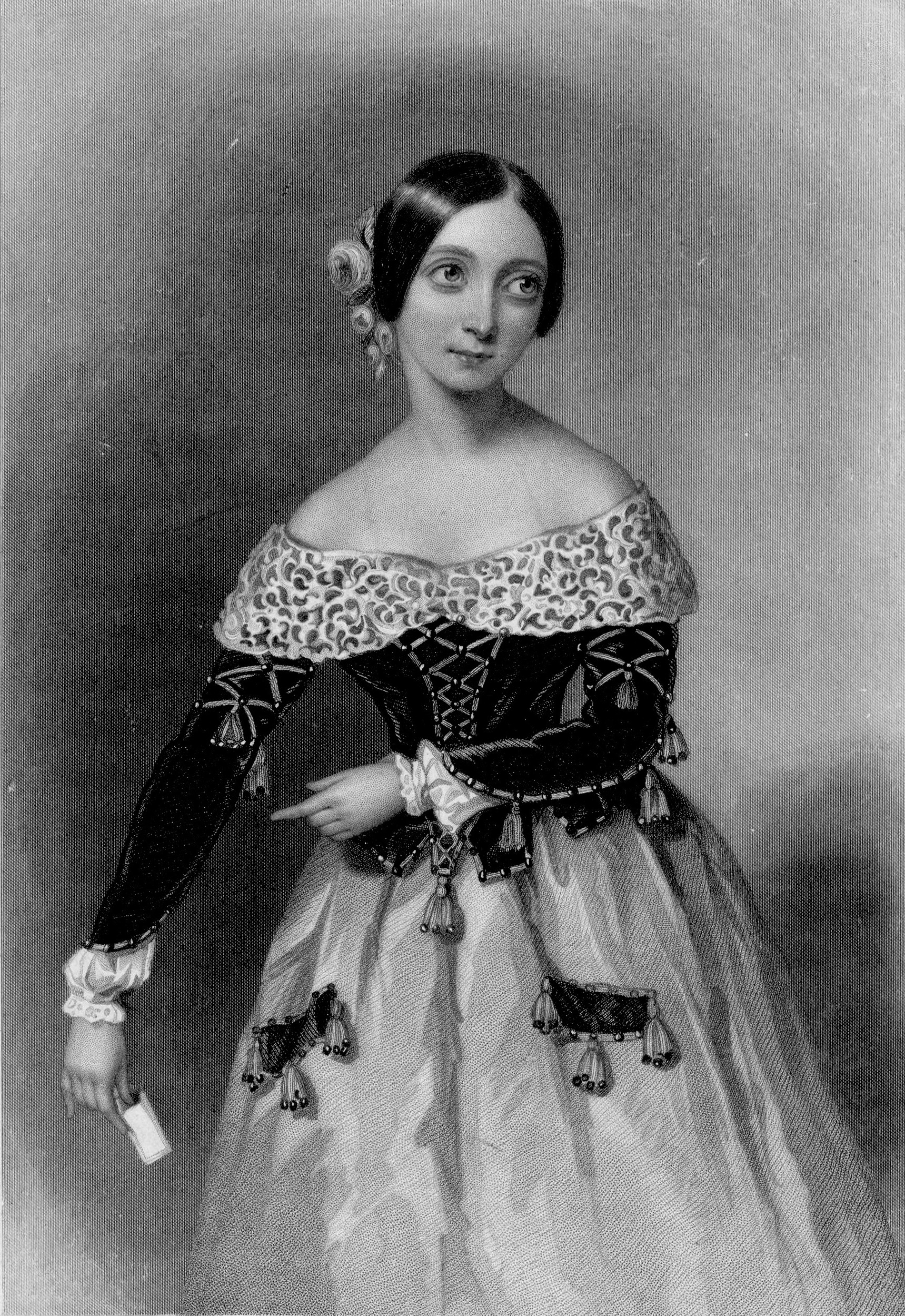
As Rosina in The Barber of Seville, 1840

She made her Paris début at the Théâtre-Italien in 1837 as Amina in La Sonnambula. She sang in the first Paris performance of L'elisir d'amore there in January 1839, with Nicolai Ivanoff, Tamburini and Lablache, for which (as was his custom) Donizetti added an aria for Tacchinardi-Persiani and a duet for her with Tamburini. In 1841 she made a tour with Rubini through various European cities including Brussels, Wiesbaden, The Hague, Bayonne, Madrid and Bayeux. She sang at the (revised) première of Linda di Chamounix in Paris in November 1842, with Mario, Tamburini and Lablache, and for that occasion the composer added for her 'O luce di quest'anima', perhaps the most successful item in the work.

Persiani was admired above all as Lucia, Amina, Rosina and Linda. In 1844 in London she sang Donizetti's little-known opera Adelia, without making any great impression. The heyday of Mme Persiani's career spanned from the 1830s to the 1850s, and was primarily in Paris and London, but with significant appearances in Vienna and St Petersburg. In 1851 she appeared in Moscow, where Anton Rubinstein considered her 'one of the very greatest of artists.' Other notable roles were the soprano leads in Torquato Tasso, Lucrezia Borgia, Ernani and I due Foscari. She was also successful in Mozart operas.

Mme Tacchinardi Persiani retired from the stage in 1859, and thereafter she and her husband gave vocal training in Paris, where she died.

Her voice was described as sweet and light with a brilliant upper register and having remarkable agility. She is said to have been able to sing a given aria several times in succession, each time with a different cadenza. She was one of the first sopranos of the "nightingale" category, a harbinger of others such as Jenny Lind, Adelina Patti, Nellie Melba, Amelita Galli-Curci, etc. She could hit a high F (F_{6}) effortlessly.
