= Omar Galliani =

Italian painter and educator (born 1954)

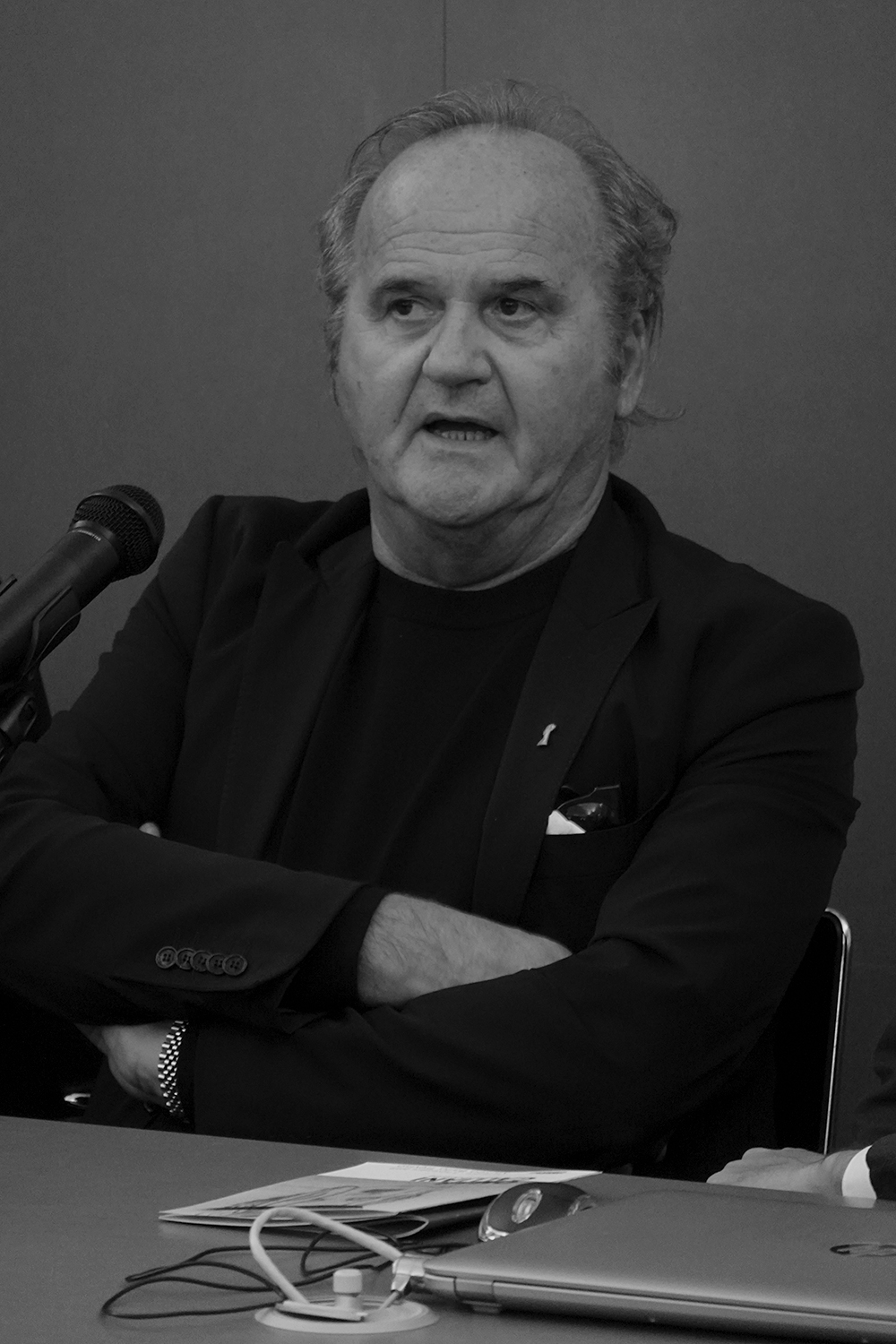
- Galliani in 2019
- Born: 1954 (age 71–72); Montecchio Emilia, Province of Reggio Emilia, Italy
- Occupations: Academic, painter

Omar Galliani (born 1954) is an Italian painter and a retired professor from the Accademia di Belle Arti di Brera (Brera Academy) in Milan.

== Life and career ==
Omar Galliani graduated from the Accademia di Belle Arti di Bologna in Bologna. He taught as full professor of painting at the Brera Academy until he retired.

In 1979, invited by Luciano Francalanci for the Italy section, he received the "Faber Castell Prize" at the first International Drawing Triennial at the Kunsthalle in Nuremberg. His works were shown at the Biennale of Venice in 1982, 1984 and 1986, in the São Paulo Biennials in Brazil and in Paris, in contemporary art museums in Japan and at the Bradford Biennial 7th British International Print (1982).

His works are included in the permanent collections of museums, including the Turin Civic Gallery of Modern and Contemporary Art in Turin, and the Museum national exhibition of China NAMOC in Beijing.

In 2018, Galliani donated one of his self-portraits to the Uffizi Gallery in Florence. The work was exhibited at the Vasari Auditorium and presented to the public by the director, Eike Schmidt, before becoming part of the collection.

In January 2019, the documentary A Matita? Omar Galliani, was produced and directed by Fulvio Wetzl.
