= Nicola Tacchinardi =

Italian opera singer (1772–1859)

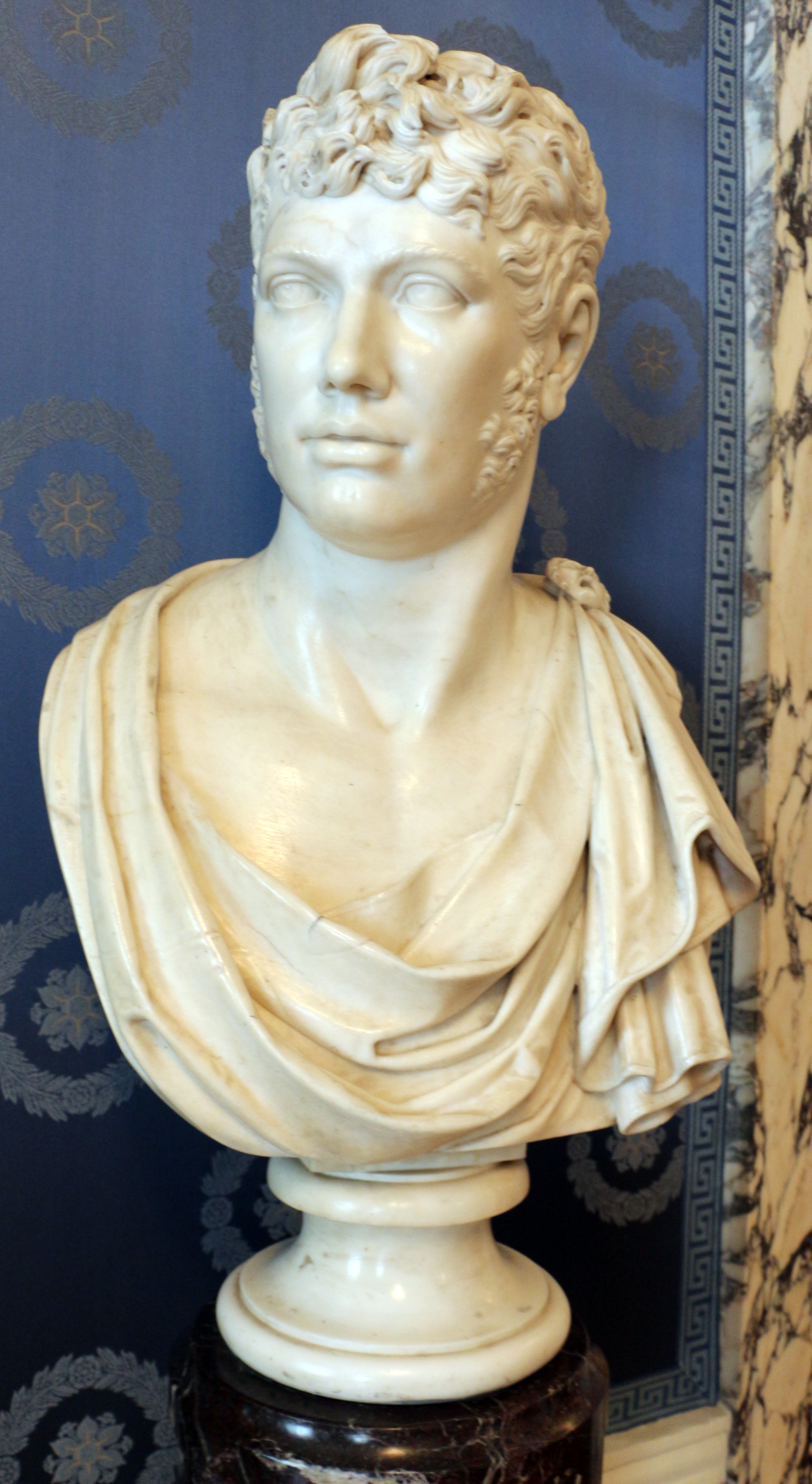
Antonio Canova, Nicola Tacchinardi

Nicola Tacchinardi (3 September 1772 – 14 March 1859), was an Italian cellist and tenor, and later voice teacher.

He was born as Niccolò Costantino Fedele Tacchinardi in Livorno by Francesco Tacchinardi, owner and teacher of a fencing school, and by Vittoria Vaccari, daughter of an employee of the Grand Ducal Navy and sister of a ship captain, Gaetano.

He was married three times. He was married for the first time in 1803. From his first wife Maria Angiola Tacchinardi, a relative, he had four children: Carolina, Ulisse, Fanny (born Francesca Felicita Maria) and Enrichetta "Elisa". He married a second time in 1837 with Caterina Tacchinardi (daughter of Giuseppe Tacchinardi and Giuseppa Bernardini), a sixty-three year old widow. His second wife died two years later in 1839 and in the same year he married for the third time with the young twenty-two year old housemaid, Maria Cleofe Santa Della Vida (daughter of Angiolo Della Vida and Anna Luperi). From his third wife he had at least two children (some sources report four): Andrea Guido Adriano known as Guido (Florence, 10 March 1840 – 6 December 1917) and Alessandro Fortunato (Florence, 1841).

He began his career as a cellist at the Teatro della Pergola in Florence, and later turned to singing, making his debut as a tenor in Livorno in 1804.

He quickly appeared throughout Italy and made in 1805, his debut at La Scala in Milan. He sang at the Théâtre-Italien in Paris from 1811 until 1814, to considerable acclaim in operas by Niccolo Zingarelli, Ferdinando Paer, Giovanni Paisiello, Antonio Salieri, and Mozart. Later, upon his return in Italy, he was much admired in Rossini roles, notably as Otello.

Tacchinardi retired from the stage in 1831, and turned to teaching. Amongst his students was his daughter, soprano Fanny Tacchinardi Persiani, who went on to create the title role in Lucia di Lammermoor. He died at Florence.

== Sources ==
- Le guide de l'opéra, les indispensable de la musique, R. Mancini & J-J. Rouveroux, (Fayard, 1986) ISBN 2-213-01563-5
