= Fountain of the Spinacorona =

Ancient fountain in central Naples

Coordinates: 40.846151°N 14.258564°E

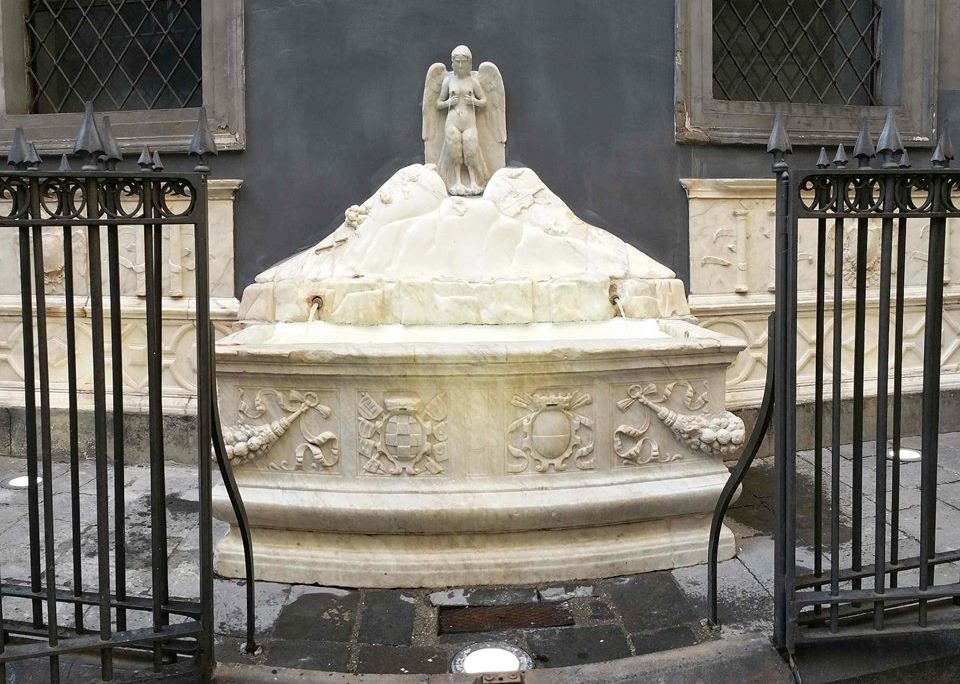
Detail of the Fountain

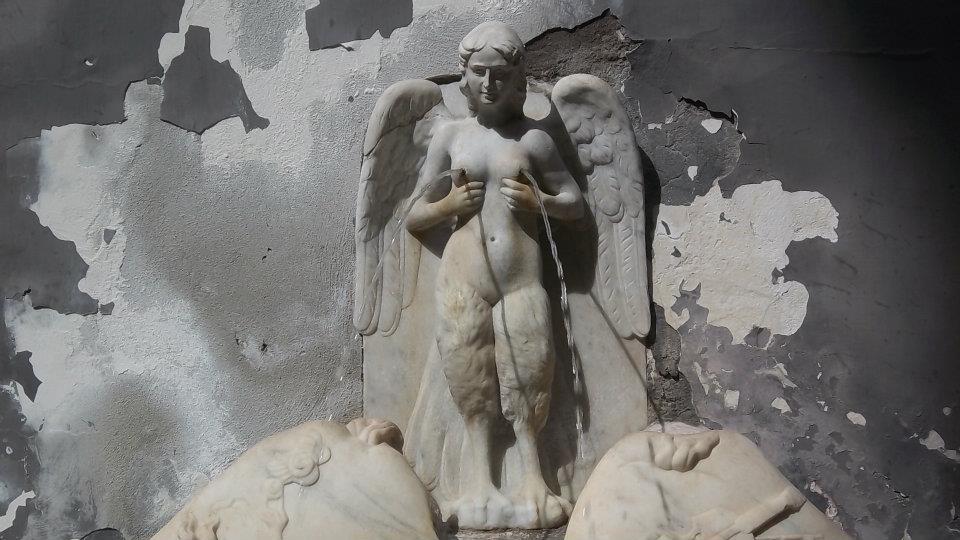
Detail of Parthenope

The Fountain of the Spinacorona, (Italian: Fontana della Spinacorona), vulgarly known as the Fontana delle Zizze (Fountain of the Breasts), is an ancient fountain in central Naples, located against a wall of the church of Santa Caterina della Spina Corona.

== History ==
There was likely a fountain at the site well before the 15th century, but documents attest to its reconstruction in 1498 It was rebuilt in the mid-16th century in the present shape by commission of the viceroy Don Pedro Álvarez de Toledo using designs by Giovanni da Nola. The fountain has the heraldic symbol of Charles I, Holy Roman Emperor.

The subject is the depiction of the siren Parthenope (icon of Naples) who douses, with water emerging from her breasts, the flames of the volcano of Vesuvius. It is unclear why a violin is carved on the slopes of the volcano. The phrase: Dum Vesevi Syrena Incendia Mulcet (While the Siren softens the fire of Vesuvius) is carved into the marble. The fountain seen today is a copy by Achille D'Orsi: the original has been housed in the Museo di San Martino since the 1920s.
