= 2500th Anniversary of the Foundation of Neapolis =

Celebrations for capital of Campania, Italy

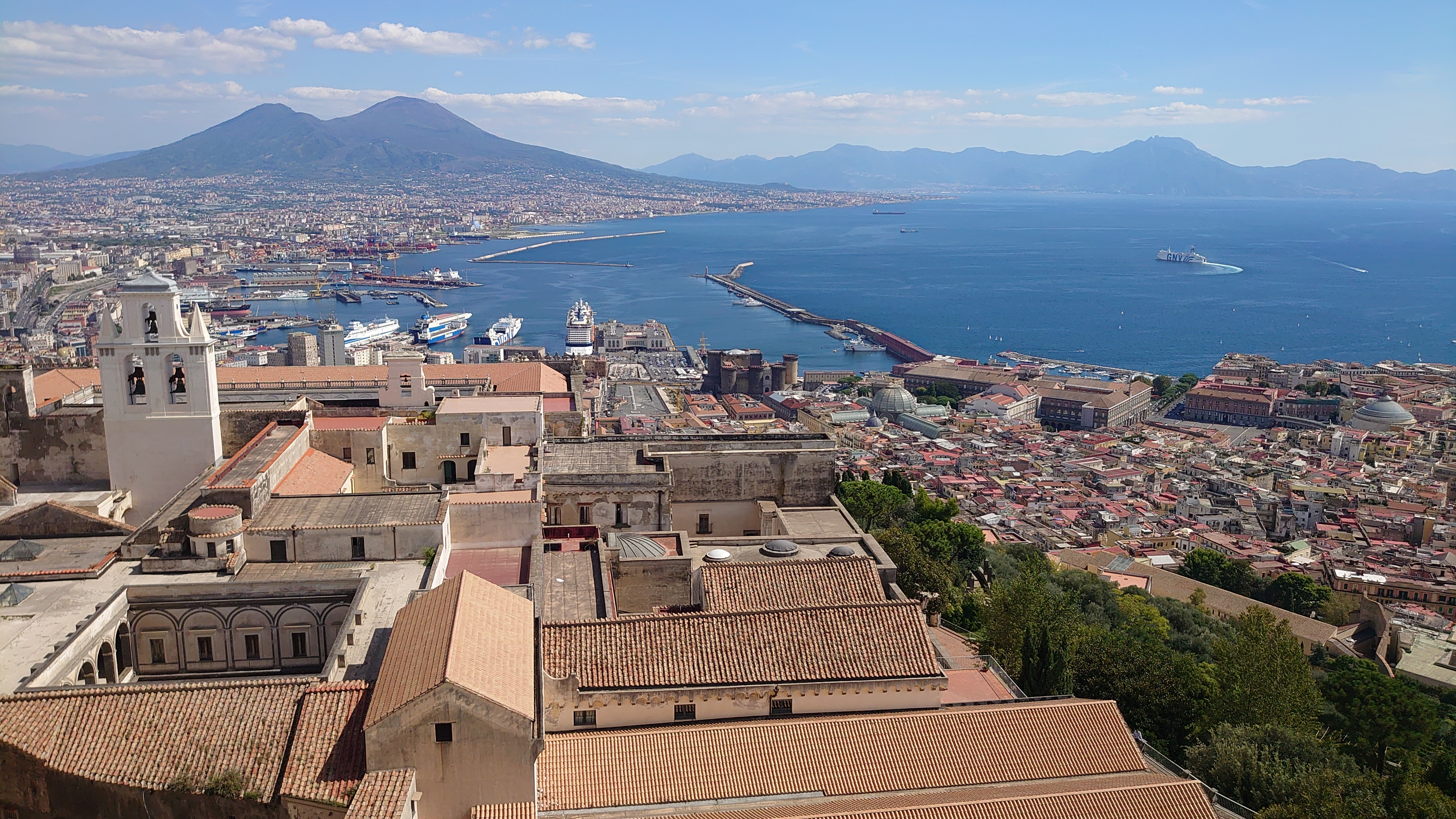
- Location: Naples
- Country: Italy
- Major events: Events

On 25 March 2025, celebrations started for the 2,500th anniversary of the founding of Naples, Italy.

== Foundation of Neapolis ==
Ancient Greek colonies, among Neápolis, and their dialect groupings in Magna Graecia.

Naples is one of the oldest continuously inhabited urban areas in the world. Naples was founded in the first millennium BC by the Greeks. In the eighth century BC, a colony known as Parthenope (Ancient Greek: Παρθενόπη) was established on the Pizzofalcone hill. In the sixth century BC, it was refounded as Neápolis. The city was an important part of Magna Graecia, played a key role in the fusion of Greek and Roman society, and was an important cultural center under the Roman Republic and then under Roman Empire. Second only to Rome in importance, it was included within the First Region (Regio I Latium et Campania) of Roman Italy.

In 2025, the city of Naples celebrated the 2500th Anniversary of the Foundation of Neapolis with a program of events organized and promoted by local bodies and institutions, which included exhibitions, museums and city tours, conferences and seminars.

== 2027 America's Cup ==
On May 15, 2025, during the celebrations it was announced that Naples will be the host city of the 2027 America's Cup, the regattas will take place in the stretch of sea between Castel dell'Ovo and Posillipo, while the team bases will be established in Bagnoli where the area will be completely redeveloped and dedicated to sailing.

== Napoli 4Ever ==
On 23 May 2025, Naples is celebrating the victory of the 4th Scudetto of Napoli, a Serie A football team. Over 50,000 Neapolitans in Piazza del Plebiscito to celebrate the team and over 500,000 in the streets and squares to celebrate the victory. Unfortunately, crowd control was particularly difficult for the police due to the huge amount of fans and people celebrating, and despite the precautions there were some injuries and some minor damage, such as to the Fontana del Carciofo. The fireworks display in the city was impressive. The celebrations will last three days until Monday 26 May 2025 in Naples and will culminate with the team's visit to the Vatican City and a meeting with Pope Leo XIV on 27 May 2025.

=== Napoli's victory in the Supercoppa Italiana ===
At the end of December 2025, the city celebrated Napoli's victory in the Supercoppa Italiana and the passing of the Olympic torch through the city for the 2026 Winter Olympics.

== Teatro di San Carlo ==
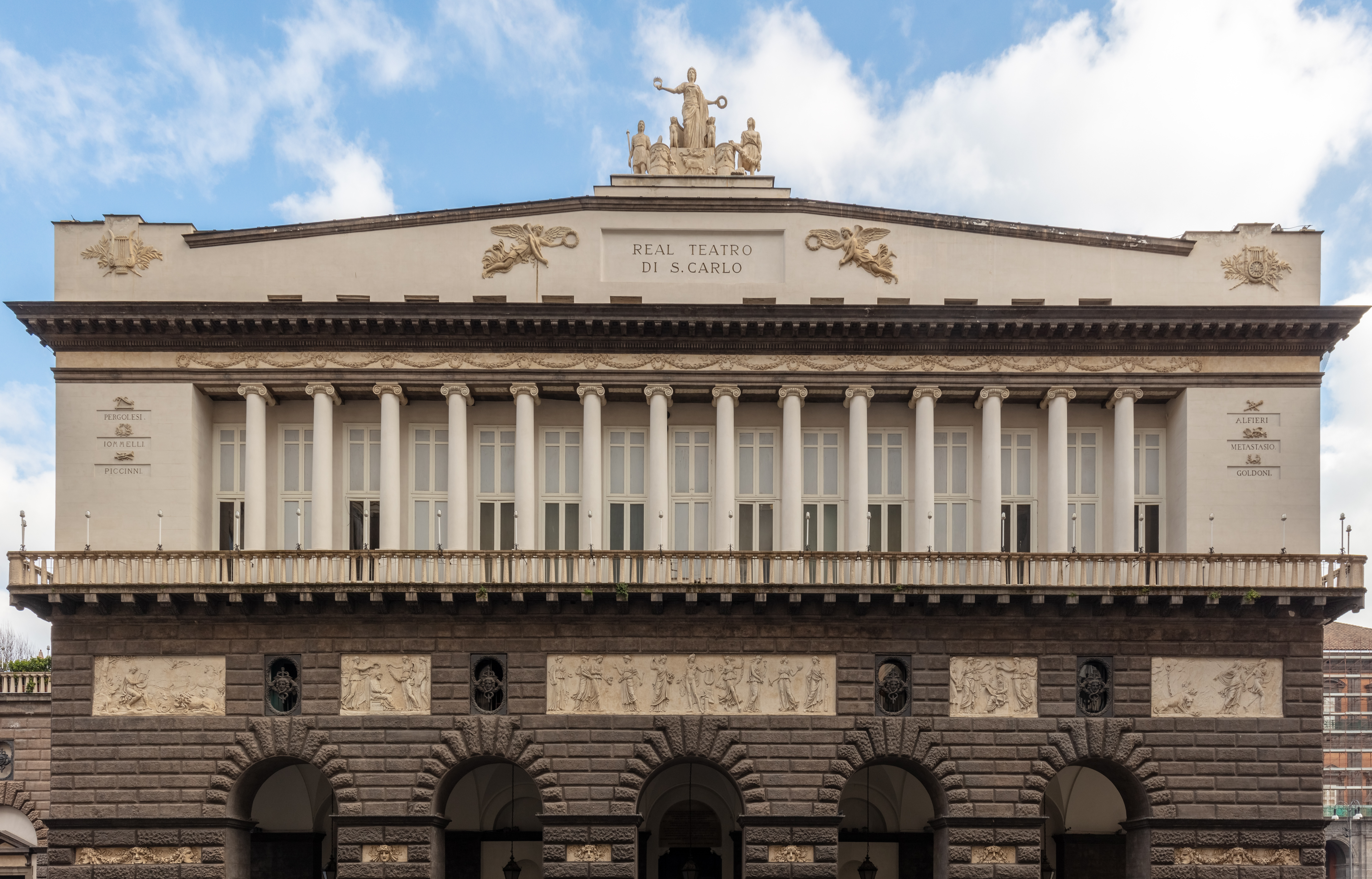
Teatro di San Carlo

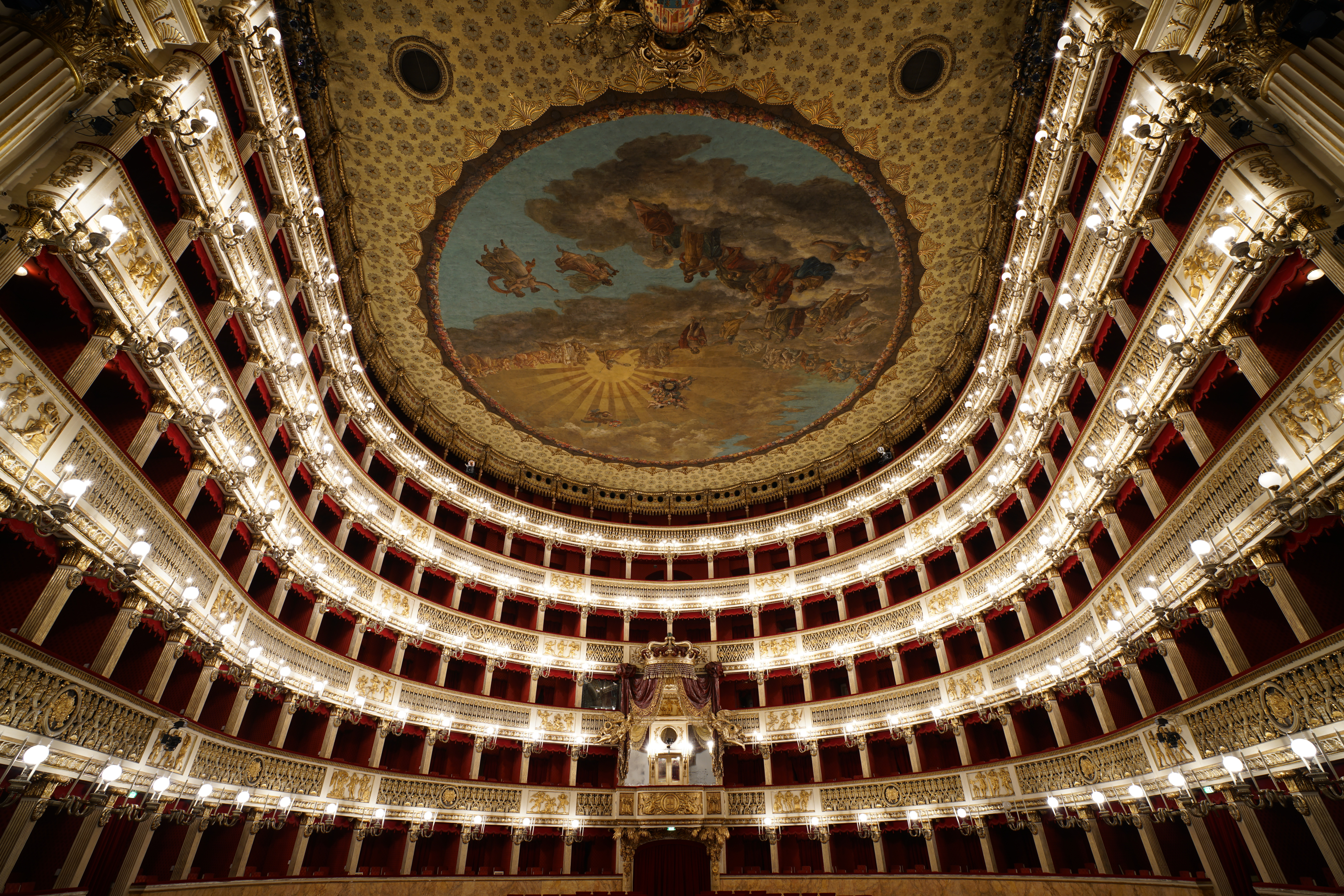
Interior view on to the royal box

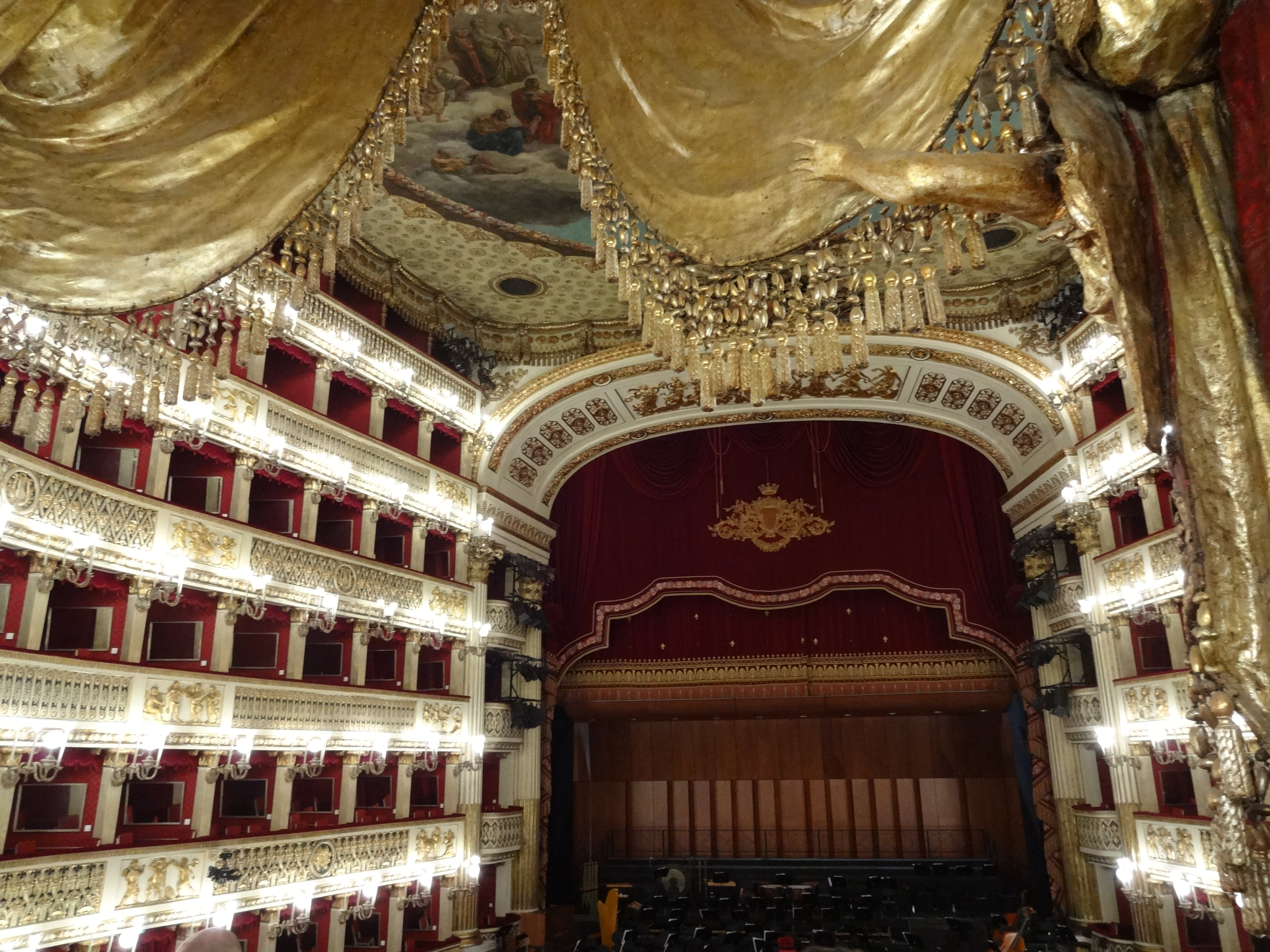
View from the royal box

On March 25, 2025, inauguration of the Napoli2500 celebrations, at the Teatro di San Carlo with the opera Napoli milionaria by Eduardo De Filippo. The 80th anniversary of the opera is also being celebrated. The De Filippo family was present in the theatre.

On December 12, 2025, Ennio Morricone's only opera, Partenope, with a libretto by Guido Barbieri and Sandro Cappelletto, debuted at the Teatro di San Carlo. Its subject is the legend from Greek Mythology of the siren Parthenope, who is associated with the founding of Naples. The opera was written and composed in 1995, but was first premiered in 2025, five years after Morricone's death, as part of the city's anniversary celebrations.

== Piazza del Plebiscito ==
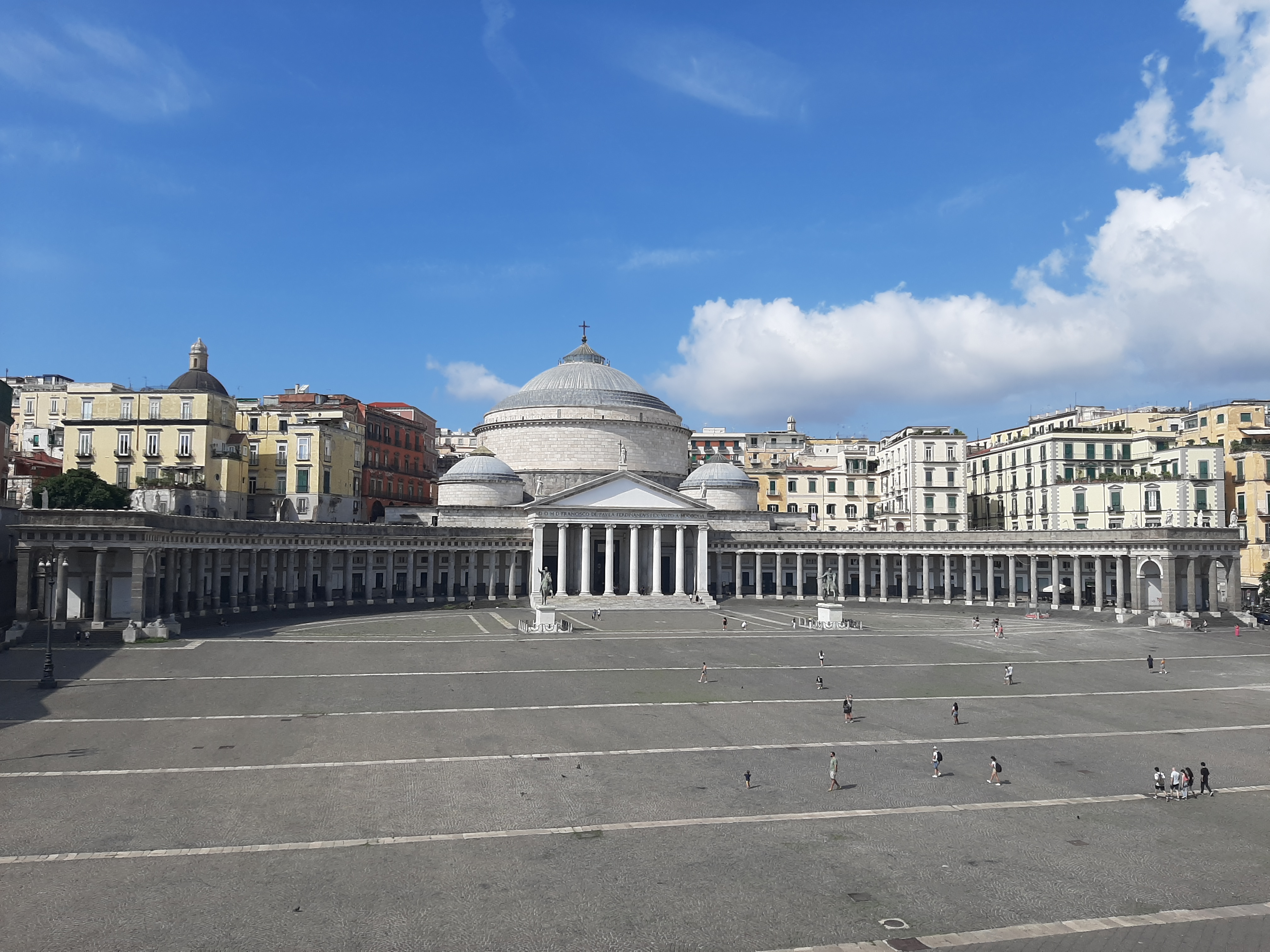
Piazza del Plebiscito seen from Royal Palace of Naples

On April 29, 2025, the Giornata Internazionale della Danza took place in collaboration with the Scuola di ballo del Teatro di San Carlo di Napoli in Piazza del Plebiscito.

== See also ==
- Magna Graecia
- Kingdom of Naples
- Timeline of Naples
- Parthenope University of Naples
- 1600th Anniversary of the Foundation of Venice
- 2027 America's Cup
