= Alalcomenae =

Alalcomenae (Ancient Greek: Ἀλαλκομεναί) is the name of several towns in Ancient Greece.

- Alalcomenae (Boeotia)
- Alalcomenae (Ithaca)
- Alalcomenae (Macedonia)
- Alalkomenes, Boeotia
