= Ocalea =

Ocalea may refer to:

- Ocalea (mythology)
- Ocalea (genus), a genus of insect of the order Coleoptera
- Ocalea (river)
- Ocalea (town)
