= Aglaope =

Siren in Greek mythology

In Greek mythology, Aglaope (Ancient Greek: Ἀγλαόπη), also called Aglaopheme (Ἀγλαοφήμη) and Aglaophonos (Ἀγλαόφωνος), is the name of one of the Sirens. Her name means "with lambent voice". Aglaope was attested as a daughter of the river-god Achelous and the Muse Melpomene or her sister Terpsichore or Sterope, daughter of King Porthaon of Calydon. She may have two or one sister(s), namely Peisinoe or Molpe, or just Thelxiepeia or Thelxinoe.
