= Alalcomenae (Boeotia) =

Town in ancient Boeotia

Coordinates: 38°23′07″N 23°00′06″E

Alalcomenae or Alalkomenai (Ancient Greek: Ἀλαλκομέναι), or Alalcomenium or Alalkomenion (Ἀλαλκομένιον), was a town in ancient Boeotia, situated at the foot of Mount Tilphossium, a little to the east of Coroneia, and near Lake Copais. It was celebrated for the worship of Athena, who was said to have been born there, and who is hence called Alalcomeneis (Ἀλαλκομενηΐς) in Homer's Iliad. The temple of the goddess stood, at a little distance from the town, on the Triton River, a small stream flowing into Lake Copais. The town was by a hill which Strabo calls Mount Tilphossium (named for Telphousa, the spring visited by the god Apollo). Strabo also records that the tomb of the seer Teiresias, and the temple of Tilphossian Apollo, were located just outside Alalcomenae.

Ancient sources preserve three accounts of the origin of the town's name:

- Stephanus of Byzantium and the geographer Pausanias — and probably Homer — preserve the story that it was named after Alalcomenes (or Alalkomenes, in Stephanus), who raised the goddess Athena there.
- Pausanias also records an account that it was named after Alalcomenia, daughter of Ogygus, King of the Ectenes, the people to first occupy the land of Thebes.
- According to Stephanus of Byzantium, the Alexandrian scholar Aristarchus of Samothrace believed the town was named from the Greek verb ἀλαλκεῖν "to protect" (< ἀλέξω), to reflect Athena's role as defender of the town. The early "D" scholia on the Iliad also reflects this account, so the idea may pre-date Aristarchus.

In view of the cult of Athena there, presumably local myth in Alalcomenae followed the first of these theories.

According to Istros the Callimachean, Anticlea gave birth to Odysseus near Alalcomenae in Boeotia; consequently, Odysseus named an Ithacan town Alalcomenae in commemoration of his birthplace.

Beyond the modern village of Solinari (Solinarion), the site of Alalcomenae, are some polygonal foundations, apparently those of a single building, which are probably remains of the peribolus of the temple. Both the town and the temple were plundered by the Roman general Sulla, who carried off the statue of the goddess. Pausanias recalls a story after Sulla stole the statue of Athena from the temple, in revenge Athena sent a plague of lice upon him; but afterwards the temple was neglected. The nearby Alalkomenes was renamed in 1928 to reflect its association with the ancient town.
