= Autochthon (ancient Greece) =

Original inhabitant of a country free from admixture of foreign peoples

In ancient Greece, the concept of autochthones (from Ancient Greek αὐτός autos "self", and χθών chthon "soil"; i.e. "people sprung from earth itself") means the indigenous inhabitants of a country, including mythological figures, as opposed to settlers, and those of their descendants who kept themselves free from an admixture of colonizing entities.

In mythology, autochthones are those mortals who have sprung from the soil, rocks and trees. They are rooted and belong to the land eternally.

== Mythology ==
Autochthons are reported in the mythology of the following regions:

- Attica: Amphictyon, Cecrops I, Cranaus, Erichthonius, Periphas, and Phlyus (father of Celaenus)
- Boeotia: Ogyges, Alalcomenes, the Spartoi and the Ectenes
- Crete: Cres, Aëtos, Lycastus and the Eteocretans
- Peloponnese: Palaechthon and Argus Panoptes of Argos; Pelasgus and Phigalus of Arcadia; Lelex of Laconia; and Aras of Phliasia; Aegialeus of Sicyon
- Phocis: Castalius (thought to be one of the parents of Thyia)
- Other regions: Cabeirus of Lemnos; Coresus of Ephesus; Evenor of Atlantis; Indus of India; Merops of Cos; Pierus of Emathia; Tyllus of Lydia; and Iarbas or Garamas of Libya

The practice in ancient Greece of describing legendary heroes and men of ancient lineage as "earthborn" greatly strengthened the doctrine of autochthony. In Thebes, the race of Spartoi were believed to have sprung from a field sown with dragons' teeth. The Phrygian Corybantes had been forced out of the hill-side like trees by Rhea, the great mother, and hence were called δενδροφυεῖς (dendrofyeís, or "arboreal"). It is clear from the Ancient Greek play Prometheus Bound, commonly attributed to Aeschylus, that primitive men were supposed to have at first lived like animals in caves and woods, until by the help of the gods and heroes they were raised to a stage of civilization.

== Tribes in historiography ==
The ancient myth of autochthony in historiography is the belief of the historian, or of the tribe itself, that they were indigenous, the first humans to inhabit their possessed land. The term first occurs in 5th century BCE ethnographic passages.

In Herodotus:

Seven tribes (ethnea) inhabit the Peloponnese. Two of these are autochthonous and are now settled in the land where they lived in the old days, the Arcadians and the Cynurians ... four nations and no more, as far as we know, inhabit Libya, two of which are autochthonous and two not; the Libyans in the north and the Ethiopians in the south of Libya; the Phoenicians and Greeks are later settlers (epêludes)... Then, a long time afterwards, the Carians were driven from the islands by Dorians and Ionians and so came to the mainland. This is the Cretan story about the Carians; but the Carians themselves do not subscribe to it, but believe that they are autochthonous inhabitants of the mainland and always bore the name which they bear now.... I think the Caunians (in Caria) are autochthones, but they say that they came from Crete. The Budini, unlike Gelonians, in Scythia are autochthones.

In Thucydides:

The Sicanians appear to have been the next settlers, although they pretend to have been the first of all and autochthones; but the facts show that they were Iberians, driven by the Ligurians from the river Sicanus in Iberia.

In a fragment of Hellanicus, the author states that the "Athenians, Arcadians, Aeginetans and Thebans are autochthones". Strabo, elaborating the ethnographic Homeric passage on Crete, describes Cydonians and Eteocretans as autochthones.

== Athenian autochthony concept ==
The Athenians of the 5th and 4th centuries BCE, during the age of Athenian Empire, claimed with pride to be an autochthonous nation that had never changed their place of habitation. According to Thucydides, Attica, where Athens is located, had known few migrations due to the poverty of the soil. They had personified their autochthony in the form of Erechtheus or Cecrops I and wore golden tettiges, or cicada-shaped ornaments in their hair as a token representing their belief that, like cicadas, Athenians were born from the soil and thus had always lived in Attica. This also served as another link between Athena and Athens, as Erechtheus was believed to have been raised by Athena.

Separate from the political ideology of autochthonism, this concept of Athenian autochthony has been linked to the rise of Athenian democracy. In contrast to the previous regime of Tyrants and Oligarchs, and their strict power hierarchies, autochthony was as an argument for democracy and egalitarianism. All Athenians were earth-brothers and thus deserved to have equal access to political power.

The "autochthony" of the Athenians was a common theme on vase paintings, in political rhetoric, and on the tragic stage. In the epideictic oration of Panegyricus, Isocrates addressed to his countrymen the following passage:

for we did not become dwellers in this land by driving others out of it, nor by finding it uninhabited, nor by coming together here a motley horde composed of many races; but we are of a lineage so noble and so pure that throughout our history we have continued in possession of the very land which gave us birth, since we are sprung from its very soil and are able to address our city by the very names which we apply to our nearest kin; for we alone of all the Hellenes have the right to call our city at once nurse and fatherland and mother.

Athenian autochthony also links to nationalistic political ideology in the fifth and fourth century. It justifies Athenian greatness and conquest over other poleis. In Menexenes, Plato has Socrates explaining the Athenian hatred against the barbarians

Because we are pure-blooded Greeks, unadulterated by barbarian stock. For there cohabit with us none of the type of Pelops, or Cadmus, or Aegyptus or Danaus, and numerous others of the kind, who are naturally barbarians though nominally Greeks.

It is unclear or unlikely that the above ideas belong to Plato himself, since Menexenus, the only non-philosophical Platonic work, has been regarded as a parody, a mock-patriotic funeral speech of Pericles or Aspasia, but in any case it provides an image of the Athenian ideology of that time.

On the other hand, Herodotus gives the following passage on the Attic genealogy, which references migratory origins in contrast to the myth of autochthony:

The Athenians, while the Pelasgians ruled what is now called Hellas, were Pelasgians, bearing the name of Cranaans. When Cecrops was their king they were called Cecropidae, and when Erechtheus succeeded to the rule, they changed their name and became Athenians. When, however, Ion son of Xuthus was commander of the Athenian army, they were called after him Ionians.

== See also ==
- Spontaneous generation
- History of Athens
- Aborigines (mythology)
- Sun Wukong
