= Niobe (mythology) =

In Greek mythology, Niobe (/ˈnaɪ.ə.biː/; Ancient Greek: Νιόβη [ni.óbɛː]: Nióbē) may refer to the following women:

- Niobe, wife of the autochthon Alalcomeneus.
- Niobe, daughter of Phoroneus and mother of Argus by Zeus.
- Niobe, daughter of Tantalus and mother of the Niobids by Amphion.
