= Siren (mythology) =

Creature in Greek mythology

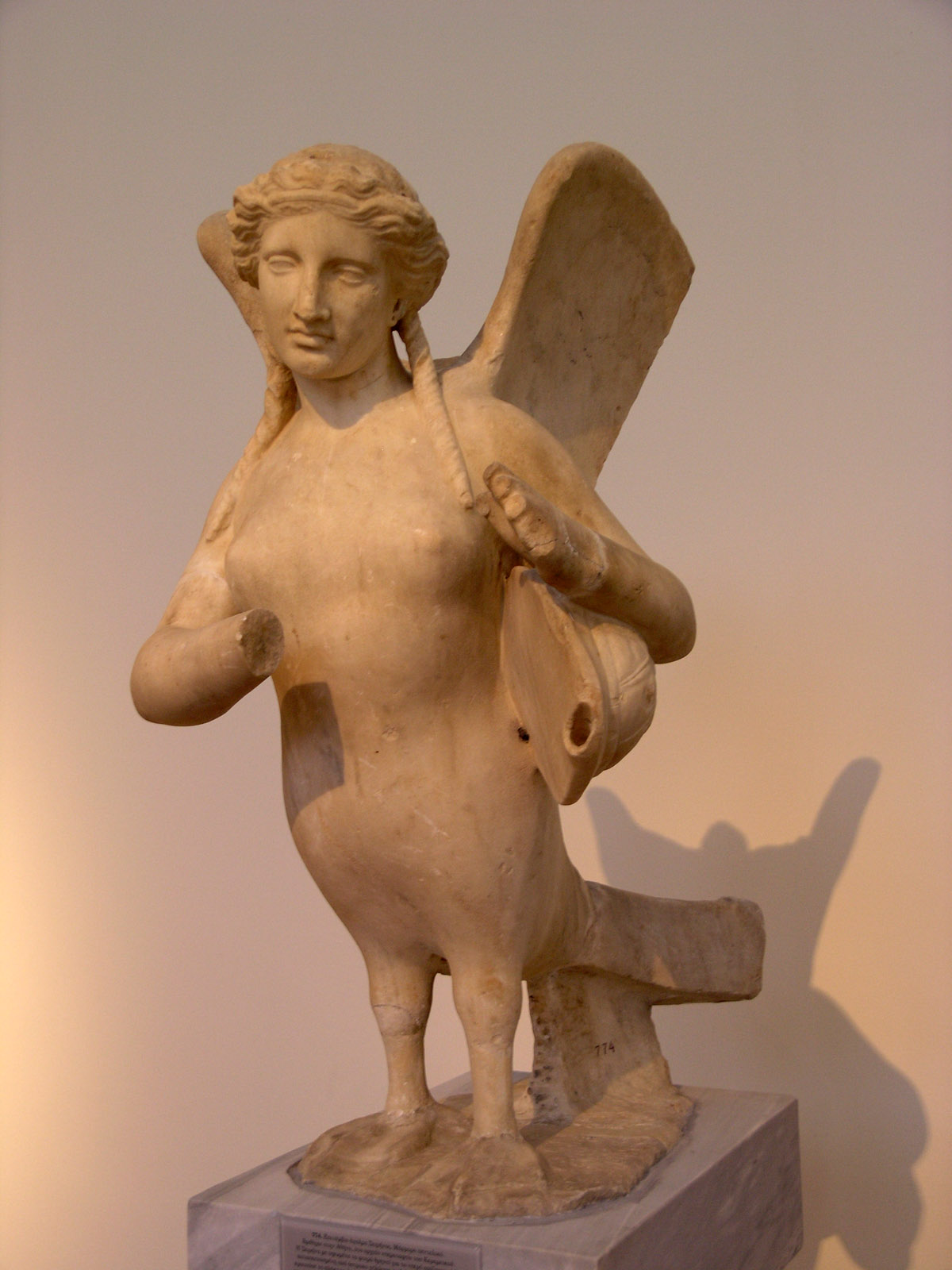
Attic funerary statue of a siren, playing on a tortoiseshell lyre, c. 370 BC

In Greek mythology, sirens (Ancient Greek: singular: Σειρήν, Seirḗn; plural: Σειρῆνες, Seirênes) are female humanlike beings with alluring voices; they appear in a scene in the Odyssey in which Odysseus saves his crew's lives. Roman poets place them on some small islands called Sirenum Scopuli. In some later, rationalized traditions, the literal geography of the "flowery" island of Anthemoessa, or Anthemusa, is fixed: sometimes on Cape Pelorum and at others in the islands known as the Sirenuse, near Paestum, or in Capreae. All such locations were surrounded by cliffs and rocks. While some versions have depicted Sirens as woman-headed birds, other versions depict them as mermaids.

Sirens were used in Christian art throughout the medieval era as a symbol of the dangerous temptation embodied by women. "Siren" can also be used as a slang term for a woman considered both very attractive and dangerous.

== Nomenclature ==
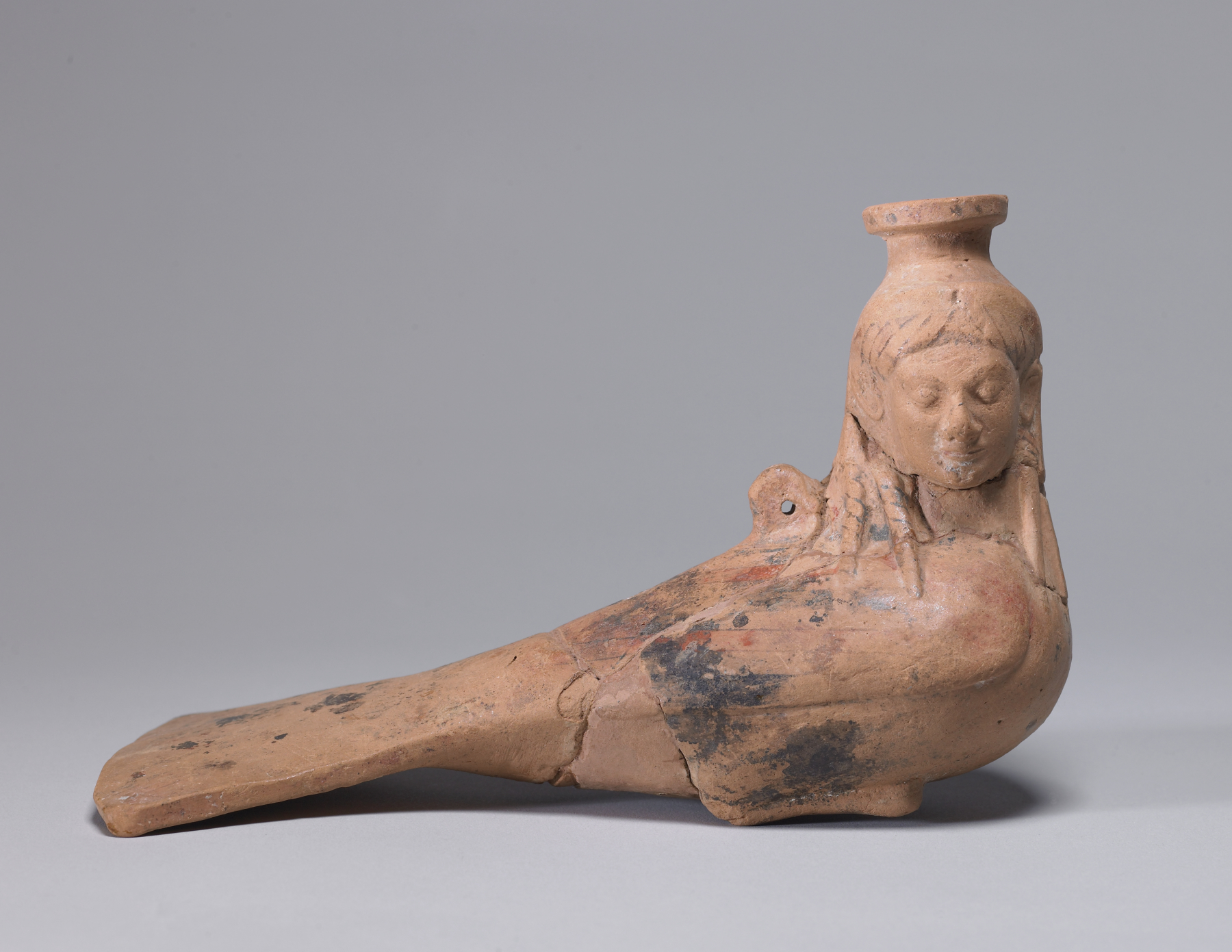
Archaic perfume vase in the shape of a siren, c. 540 BC

The etymology of the name is contested. Robert S. P. Beekes has suggested a Pre-Greek origin. Others connect the name to σειρά (seirá, "rope, cord") and εἴρω (eírō, "to tie, join, fasten"), resulting in the meaning "binder, entangler", i.e. one who binds or entangles through magic song. This could be connected to the famous scene of Odysseus being bound to the mast of his ship, to resist their song. Marcel Cohen suggested that sirens are related to the Biblical word sir'a, which means wasp. Wasps, and metaphors containing wasps, appear in the Bible when armies are put in danger.

Sirens were later often used as a synonym for mermaids and portrayed with upper human bodies and fish tails. This combination became iconic in the medieval period. The circumstances leading to the commingling involve the treatment of sirens in the medieval Physiologus and bestiaries, both iconographically, as well as textually in translations from Latin to vulgar languages, (Note: Old High German meremanniu in the OHG Physiologus, and Middle English merman 'mermaid', in the ME Bestiary.) as described below.

== Iconography ==
=== Classical iconography ===
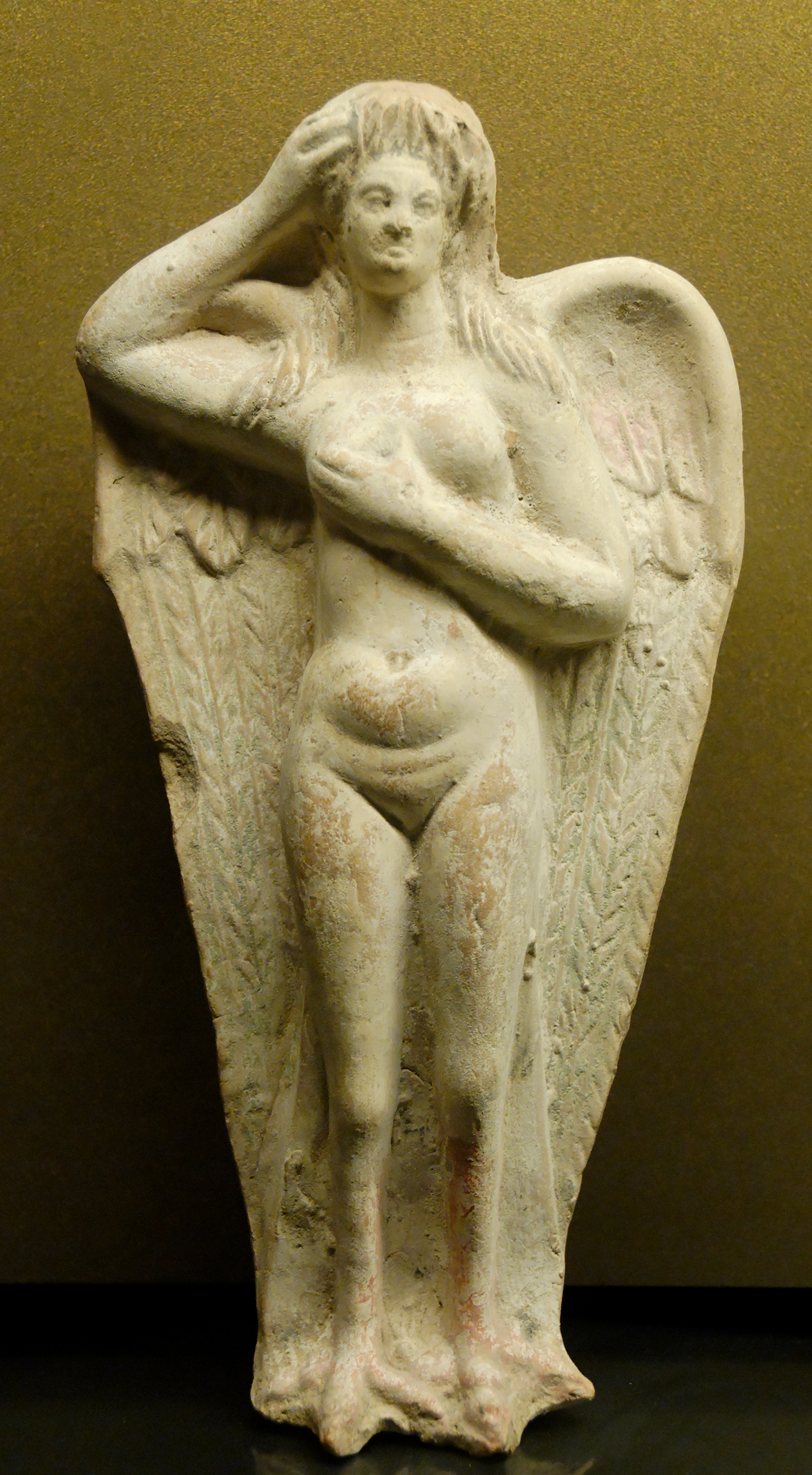
Moaning siren statuette from Myrina, first century BC

The sirens of Greek mythology first appeared in Homer's Odyssey, where Homer did not provide any physical descriptions, and their visual appearance was left to the readers' imagination. By the 7th century BC, sirens were regularly depicted in art as human-headed birds. Apollonius of Rhodes in Argonautica (3rd century BC) described the sirens in writing as part woman and part bird. (Note: Argonautica 4.891ff. Seaton tr. (1912): "and at that time they were fashioned in part like birds and in part like maidens to behold") They may have been influenced by the ba-bird of Egyptian religion. In early Greek art, the sirens were generally represented as large birds with women's heads, bird feathers and scaly feet. Later depictions shifted to show sirens with human upper bodies and bird legs, with or without wings. They were often shown playing a variety of musical instruments, especially the lyre, kithara, and aulos.

The tenth-century Byzantine dictionary Suda stated that sirens (Ancient Greek: Σειρῆνας, romanized: Seirênas) (Note: The headword is accusative plural (Commentary to the Sudas entry).) had the form of sparrows from their chests up, and below they were women or that they were little birds with women's faces.

Originally, sirens were shown as male or female, but the male siren disappeared from art around the fifth century BC.

==== Early siren-mermaids ====
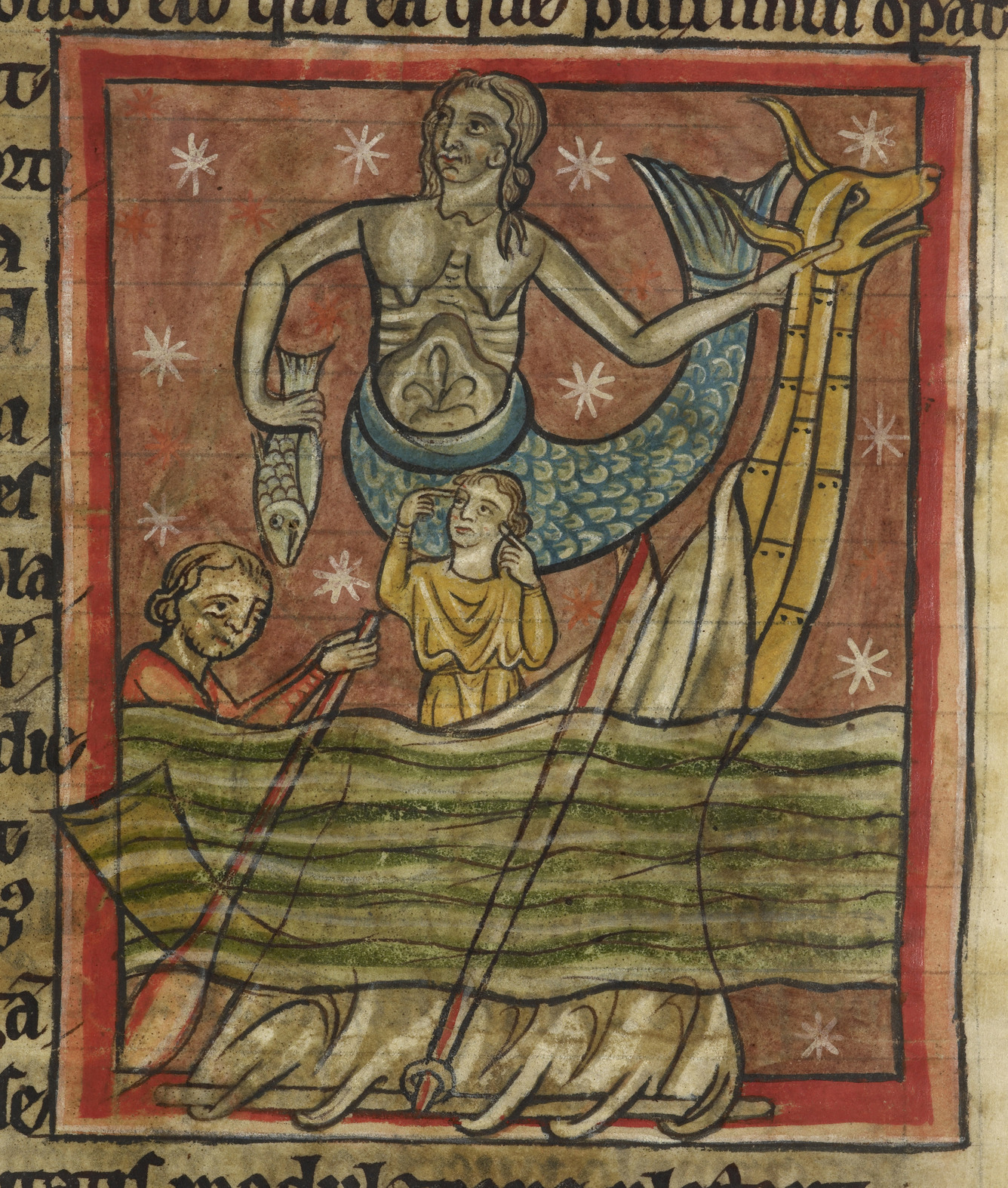
Miniature illustration of a siren enticing sailors who try to resist her, from an English Bestiary, c. 1235

Some surviving Classical period examples had already depicted the siren as mermaid-like. The sirens are described as mermaids or "tritonesses" in examples dating to the 3rd century BC, including an earthenware bowl found in Athens (Note: A mould made Megarian bowl excavated in the Ancient Agora of Athens, catalogued P 18,640. Rotroff (1982), p. 67 apud Holford-Strevens (2006), p. 29; Thompson (1948), pp. 161–162 and Fig. 5) (Note: A terracotta piece of a "mourning siren", 250 BC, according to Waugh.) and a terracotta oil lamp possibly from the Roman period.

The first known literary attestation of siren as a "mermaid" appeared in the Anglo-Latin catalogue Liber Monstrorum (early 8th century AD), where it says that sirens were "sea-girls... with the body of a maiden, but have scaly fishes' tails".

=== Medieval iconography ===
The siren appeared in several illustrated manuscripts of the Physiologus and its successors called the bestiaries. The siren was depicted as a half-woman and half-fish mermaid in the 9th century Berne Physiologus, (Note: Berne, Bürgerbibliotek Cod. 318. fol. 13v. Rubric: "De Natura Serena et honocentauri".) as an early example, but continued to be illustrated with both bird-like parts (wings, clawed feet) and fish-like tail.

== Classical literature ==
=== Family tree ===
Although a Sophocles fragment makes Phorcys their father, when sirens are named, they are usually as daughters of the river god Achelous, either by the Muse Terpsichore, Melpomene or Calliope or lastly by Sterope, daughter of King Porthaon of Calydon.

In Euripides's play Helen (167), Helen in her anguish calls upon "Winged maidens, daughters of the Earth (Chthon)." Although they lured mariners, the Greeks portrayed the sirens in their "meadow starred with flowers" and not as sea deities. Epimenides claimed that the sirens were children of Oceanus and Ge. Sirens are found in many Greek stories, notably in Homer's Odyssey.

=== List of sirens ===
Their number is variously reported as from two to eight. In the Odyssey, Homer says nothing of their origin or names, but gives the number of the sirens as two. Later writers mention both their names and number: some state that there were three, Peisinoe, Aglaope, and Thelxiepea or Aglaonoe, Aglaopheme, and Thelxiepea; Parthenope, Ligeia, and Leucosia; Apollonius, like Hesiod, gives their names as Thelxinoe, Molpe, and Aglaophonos; the Suda gives their names as Thelxiepea, Peisinoe, and Ligeia; Hyginus gives the number of the sirens as four: Teles, Rhaidne, Molpe, and Thelxiope; Eustathius states that they were two, Aglaopheme and Thelxiepea; an ancient vase painting attests the two names as Himerope and Thelxiepea.

Their names are variously rendered in the later sources as Thelxiepea/Thelxiope/Thelxinoe, Molpe, Himerope, Aglaophonos/Aglaope/Aglaopheme, Pisinoe/Peisinoë/Peisithoe, Parthenope, Ligeia, Leucosia, Rhaidne, Teles, etc.

- Molpe (Μολπή)
- Thelxiepe(i)a (Θελξιέπεια) or Thelxiope (Θελξιόπη) "eye pleasing") or Thelxinoe (Θελξινόη)
- Himerope (Ἱμερόπη)
- Aglaophonos (Ἀγλαόφωνος) or Aglaope (Ἀγλαόπη) or Aglaopheme (Ἀγλαοφήμη)
- Peisinoe (Πεισινόη) or Peisithoe (Πεισιθόη)
- Parthenope (Παρθενόπη)
- Ligeia (Λίγεια)
- Leucosia (Λευκωσία)
- Rhaidne (Ῥαίδνη)
- Teles (Τέλης)
- Telchter(e)ia (Θελχτήρεια)

Comparative table of sirens' names, number and parentage
Relation	Names	Sources																	
Relation	Names	Homer	Epimenides	Hesiod	Sophocles	(Sch. on) Apollonius	Lycophron		Strabo	Apollodorus	Hyginus		Servius	Eustathius	Suda	Tzetzes		Vase painting	Euripides
Relation	Names	Homer	Epimenides	Hesiod	Sophocles	(Sch. on) Apollonius	Alex.	Tzet.	Strabo	Apollodorus	Brunte	Grant	Servius	Eustathius	Suda	Tzetzes		Vase painting	Euripides
Parentage	Oceanus and Gaea		✓																
Parentage	Chthon																		✓
Parentage	Achelous and Terpsichore					✓										✓			
Parentage	Achelous and Melpomene						✓			✓	✓	✓				✓			
Parentage	Achelous and Sterope									✓									
Parentage	Achelous and Calliope												✓						
Parentage	Phorcys				✓														
Number	2	✓							✓					✓				✓	
Number	3			✓		✓	✓	✓		✓		✓			✓	✓			
Number	4										✓								
Individual name	Thelxinoe or Thelxiope			✓		✓					✓								
Individual name	Thelxiepe							✓				✓							
Individual name	Thelxiep(e)ia									✓				✓	✓		✓	✓	
Individual name	Aglaophonus			✓		✓													
Individual name	Aglaope							✓		✓									
Individual name	Aglaopheme													✓			✓		
Individual name	Aglaonoe																✓		
Individual name	Molpe			✓		✓					✓	✓							
Individual name	Peisinoe or Pisinoe							✓		✓		✓			✓				
Individual name	Parthenope						✓		✓				✓			✓			
Individual name	Leucosia						✓		✓							✓			
Individual name	Raidne										✓								
Individual name	Teles										✓								
Individual name	Ligeia						✓								✓	✓			
Individual name	Himerope																	✓	

=== Mythology ===
==== Demeter ====
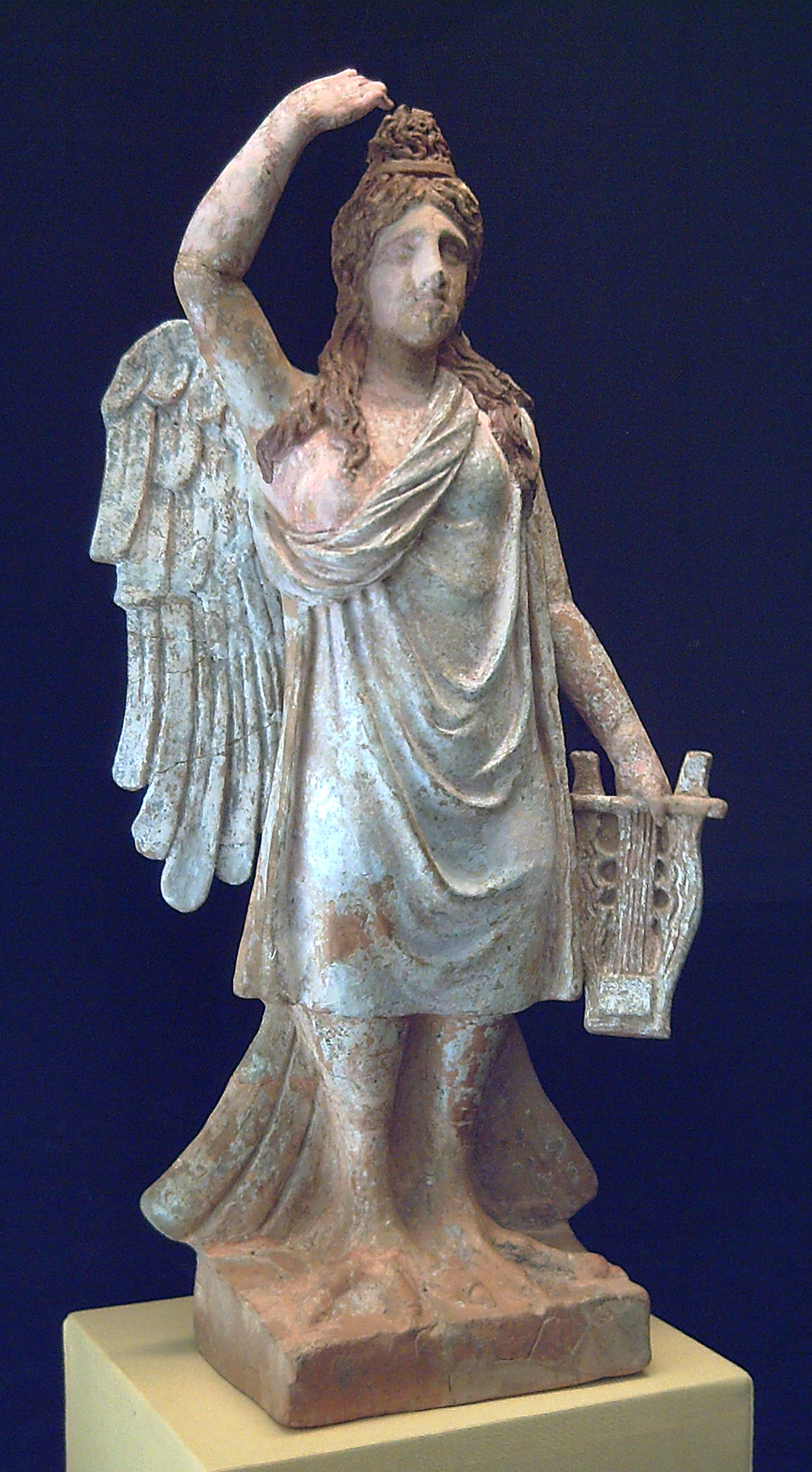
The Siren of Canosa, statuette exposing psychopomp characteristics, late fourth century BC

According to Ovid (43 BC–17 AD), the sirens were the companions of young Persephone. Demeter gave them wings to search for Persephone when she was abducted by Hades. However, the Fabulae of Hyginus (64 BC–17 AD) has Demeter cursing the sirens for failing to intervene in the abduction of Persephone. According to Hyginus, sirens were fated to live only until the mortals who heard their songs could pass by them.

==== The Muses ====
In the sanctuary of Hera in Coroneia was a statue created by Pythodorus of Thebes, depicting Hera holding the sirens. According to the myth, Hera persuaded the sirens to challenge the Muses to a singing contest. After the Muses won, they are said to have plucked the sirens' feathers and used them to make crowns for themselves. According to Stephanus of Byzantium, the sirens, overwhelmed by their loss, cast off their feathers from their shoulders, turned white and then threw themselves into the sea. As a result, the nearby city was named Aptera ("featherless") and the nearby islands were called the Leukai ("the white ones"). John Tzetzes recounts that after defeating the sirens, the Muses crowned themselves with the sirens' wings, except for Terpsichore who was their mother, adding that the city of Aptera was named after this event. Furthermore, in one of his letters, Julian the Emperor mentions the Muses' victory over the sirens.

==== Argonautica ====
In the Argonautica (third century BC), Jason had been warned by Chiron that Orpheus would be necessary in his journey. When Orpheus heard their voices, he drew out his lyre and played his music more beautifully than they, drowning out their voices. One of the crew, however, the sharp-eared hero Butes, heard the song and leapt into the sea, but he was caught up and carried safely away by the goddess Aphrodite.

==== Odyssey ====
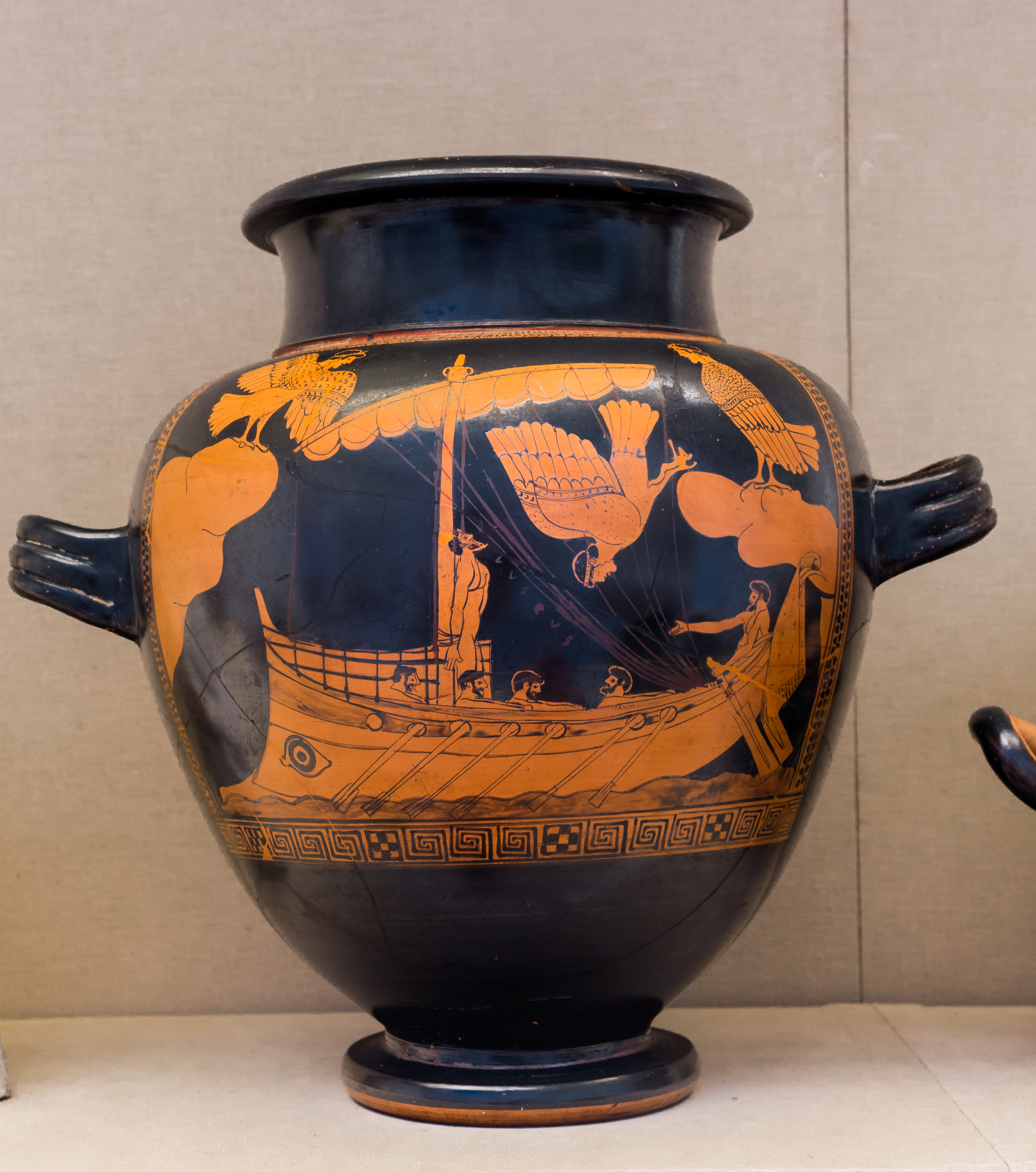
Odysseus and the Sirens, eponymous vase of the Siren Painter, c. 475 BC

Odysseus was curious as to what the sirens sang to him, and so, on the advice of Circe, he had all of his sailors plug their ears with beeswax and tie him to the mast. He ordered his men to leave him tied tightly to the mast, no matter how much he might beg. When he heard their beautiful song, he signaled with his frowns for the sailors to untie him but they bound him tighter. When they had passed out of earshot, his men released him. Some post-Homeric authors state that the sirens were fated to die if someone heard their singing and escaped them, and that after Odysseus passed by they therefore flung themselves into the water and perished.

==== Pliny ====
The first-century Roman historian Pliny the Elder discounted sirens as a pure fable, "although Dinon, the father of Clearchus, a celebrated writer, asserts that they exist in India, and that they charm men by their song, and, having first lulled them to sleep, tear them to pieces."

=== Sirens and death ===
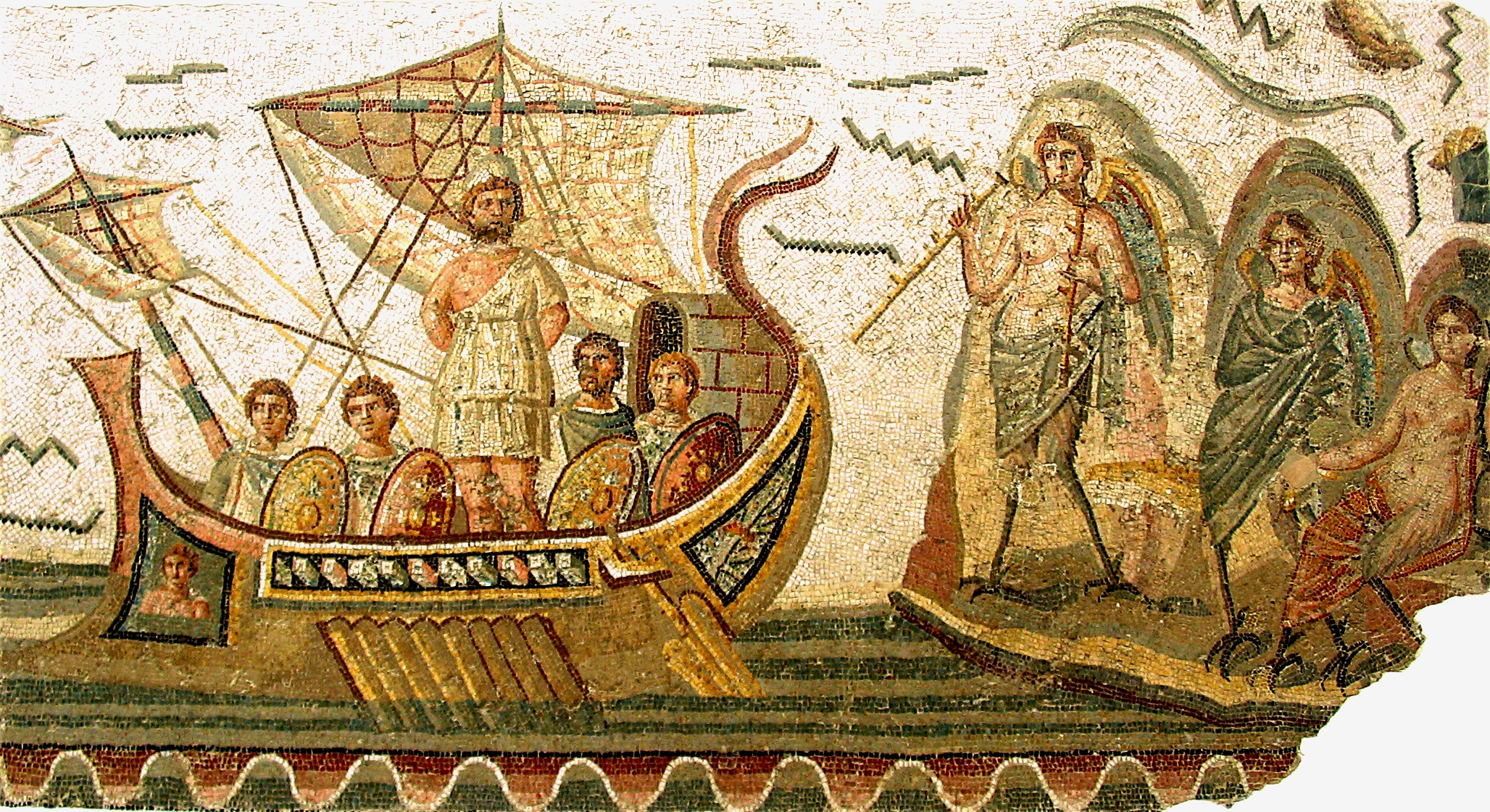
Odysseus and the Sirens, Roman mosaic, second century AD (Bardo National Museum)

Statues of sirens in a funerary context are attested since the classical era, in mainland Greece, as well as Asia Minor and Magna Graecia. The so-called "Siren of Canosa"—Canosa di Puglia is a site in Apulia that was part of Magna Graecia—was said to accompany the dead among grave goods in a burial. She appeared to have some psychopomp characteristics, guiding the dead on the afterlife journey. The cast terracotta figure bears traces of its original white pigment. The woman bears the feet, wings and tail of a bird. The sculpture is conserved in the National Archaeological Museum of Spain, in Madrid. The sirens were called the Muses of the lower world. Classical scholar Walter Copland Perry (1814–1911) observed: "Their song, though irresistibly sweet, was no less sad than sweet, and lapped both body and soul in a fatal lethargy, the forerunner of death and corruption." Their song is continually calling on Persephone.

The term "siren song" refers to an appeal that is hard to resist but that, if heeded, will lead to a bad conclusion. Later writers have implied that the sirens ate humans, based on Circe's description of them "lolling there in their meadow, round them heaps of corpses rotting away, rags of skin shriveling on their bones." As linguist Jane Ellen Harrison (1850–1928) notes of "The Ker as siren": "It is strange and beautiful that Homer should make the sirens appeal to the spirit, not to the flesh." The siren song is a promise to Odysseus of mantic truths; with a false promise that he will live to tell them, they sing,

Once he hears to his heart's content, sails on, a wiser man.
We know all the pains that the Greeks and Trojans once endured
on the spreading plain of Troy when the gods willed it so—
all that comes to pass on the fertile earth, we know it all!

"They are mantic creatures like the Sphinx with whom they have much in common, knowing both the past and the future", Harrison observed. "Their song takes effect at midday, in a windless calm. The end of that song is death." That the sailors' flesh is rotting away suggests it has not been eaten. It has been suggested that, with their feathers stolen, their divine nature kept them alive, but unable to provide food for their visitors, who starved to death by refusing to leave.

== Late antiquity to the modern era ==
=== Book of Enoch ===
According to the ancient Hebrew Book of Enoch, the women who were led astray by the fallen angels will be turned into sirens.

=== Christian theologians ===
Saint Jerome, who produced the Latin Vulgate version of the bible, used the word sirens to translate Hebrew tannīm ("jackals") in the Book of Isaiah 13:22, and also to translate a word for "owls" in the Book of Jeremiah 50:39.

The siren is allegorically described as a beautiful courtesan or prostitute, who sings pleasant melodies to men, and is the symbolic vice of Pleasure in the preaching of Clement of Alexandria (2nd century). Later writers such as Ambrose (4th century) reiterated the notion that the siren stood as a symbol or allegory for worldly temptations and not an endorsement of the Greek myth.

The early Christian euhemerist interpretation of mythologized human beings received a long-lasting boost from the Etymologiae by Isidore of Seville (c. 560–636):

They [the Greeks] imagine that "there were three sirens, part virgins, part birds," with wings and claws. "One of them sang, another played the flute, the third the lyre. They drew sailors, decoyed by song, to shipwreck. According to the truth, however, they were prostitutes who led travelers down to poverty and were said to impose shipwreck on them." They had wings and claws because Love flies and wounds. They are said to have stayed in the waves because a wave created Venus.

=== Physiologus and bestiaries ===
==== Allegorical texts ====
The siren and the onocentaur, two hybrid creatures, appear as the subject of a single chapter in the Physiologus, as they appear together in the Septuagint translation of the aforementioned Isaiah 13:21–22, and 34:14. (Note: The sirens (seirenes) do figure in the earliest surviving versions (version G, Μ, Γ and others). But the siren did not figure in the earlier Greek version of the Physiologos (4th century, preserved by Epiphanius) nor the Armenian translation from Greek originals.) They also appear together in some Latin bestiaries of the First Family subgroup called B-Isidore ("B-Is").

==== The miniatures ====
Sirens in bestiaries

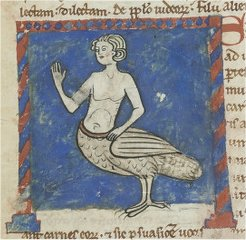
Siren.
―BnF Latin 6838 B, fol. 25v

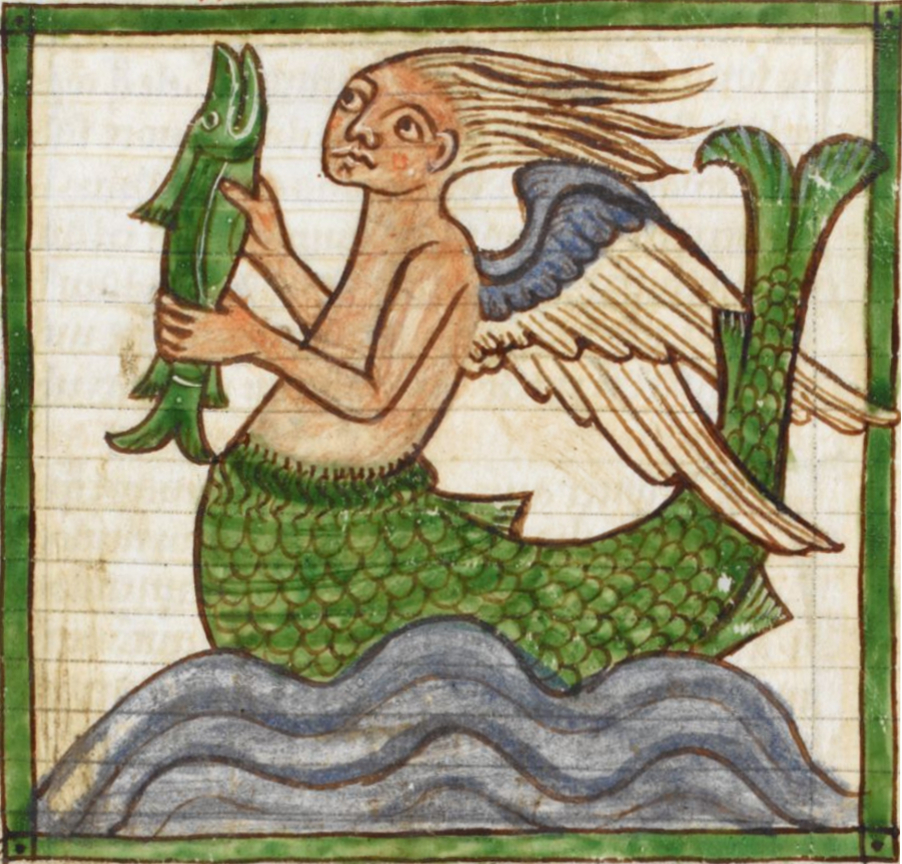
Siren.
―Bestiary bound in a theological miscellany. British Library, Harley MS 3244

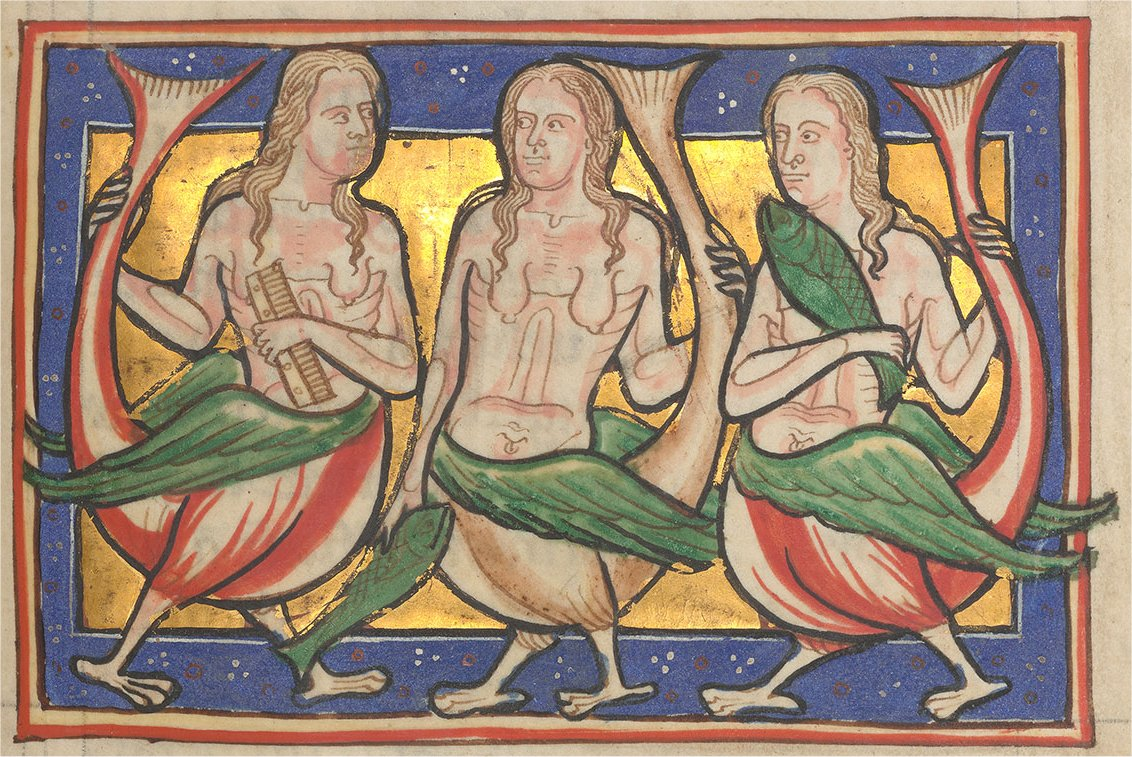
Sirens. One on the left holds a comb. Worksop Bestiary. Morgan Library M.81

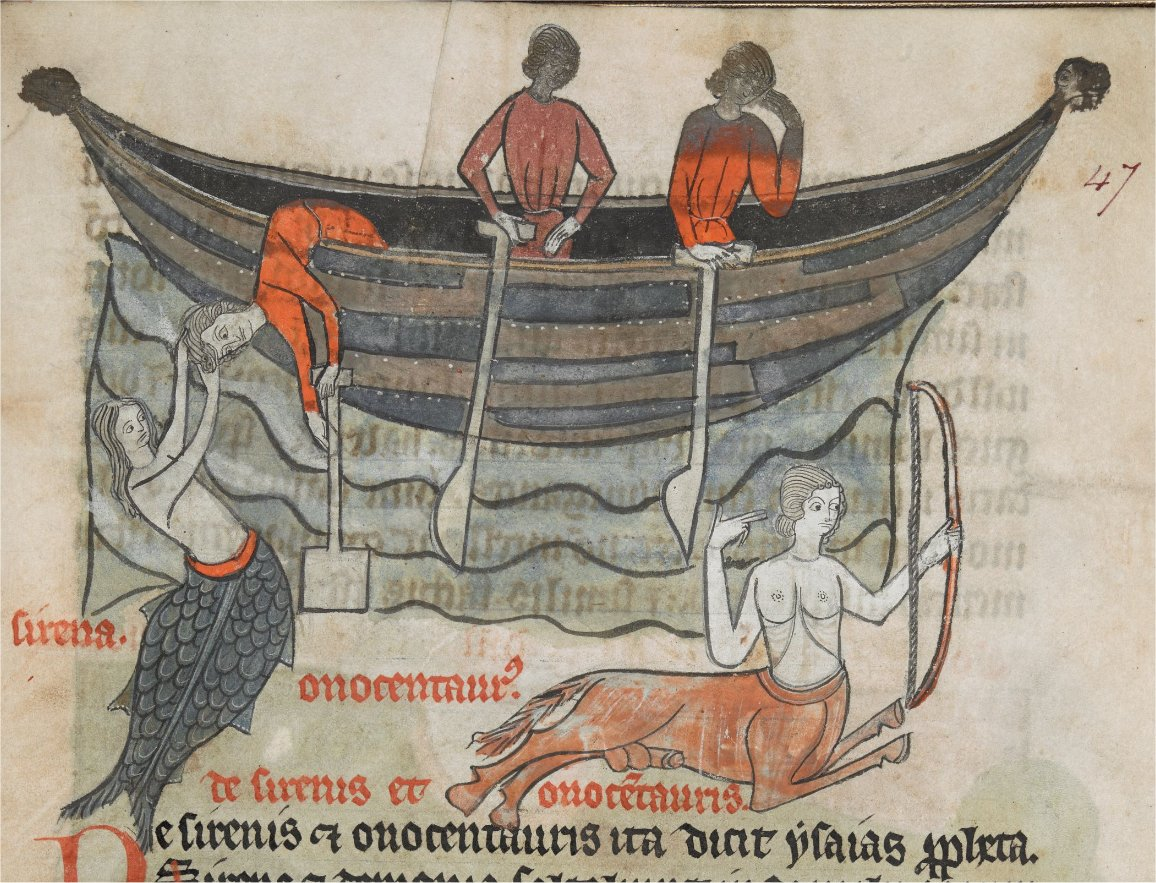
(Bottom left) fish-siren of mermaid-form. (Bottom right) onocentaur Bestiary, Sloane MS. 278, fol. 47r

The siren's bird-like description from classical sources was retained in the Latin version of the Physiologus (6th century) and several subsequent bestiaries into the 13th century, but at some time during the interim, the mermaid shape was introduced to this body of works.

As woman-fish or mermaid

The siren was illustrated as a woman-fish (mermaid) in the Bern Physiologus dated to the mid-9th century, even though this contradicted the accompanying text which described it as avian. An English-made Latin bestiary dated 1220–1250 also depicted a group of sirens as mermaids with fishtails swimming in the sea, even though the text stated they resembled winged fowl (volatilis habet figuram) down to their feet. (Note: Oxford, MS Bodley 764, fol. 74v.) (Note: There is another entry for "siren", as a winged white serpent of Arabia.)

Illustrating the siren as a pure mermaid became commonplace in the "second family" bestiaries, and she was shown holding a musical instrument in the classical tradition, but also sometimes holding apparently an eel-fish. An example of the siren-mermaid holding such a fish is found in one of the earlier codices in this group, dated the late 12th century. (Note: Brit. Lib. Add. 11283, late 12c., Clark (2006), p. 21, fol. 20v)

As bird-like

A counterexample is also given where the illustrated sirens (group of three) are bird-like, conforming to the text. (Note: Oxford, MS Bodley 602, fol. 10r. 12th century.)

As hybrid

The siren was sometimes drawn as a hybrid with a human torso, a fish-like lower body, and bird-like wings and feet. While in the Harley 3244 (cf. fig. top right) the wings sprout from around the shoulders, in other hybrid types, the style places the siren's wings "hanging at the waist". (Note: Cambridge University Library Ii.4.26, fol. 39v.) (Note: Compare Northumberland bestiary (Getty MS 100) (olim Alnwick bestiary, Alnwick Castle MS 447). Comment of "webbed feet" in the two examples seems false for the CUL ms., while "webbed feet of an aquatic animal" is corroborated for the Northumberland bestiary.)

Comb and mirror

Also, a siren may be holding a comb, (Note: Or there may be three sirens drawn, two holding fish and third a mirror, as in Getty MS. 100 (olim Alnwick ms.) A similar composition occurs on the Morgan M.81, cf. fig. right.) or a mirror. (Note: British Library Ms. Royal 2.B.Vii, fol. 96v.)

Thus the comb and mirror, which are now emblematic of mermaids across Europe, derive from the bestiaries that describe the siren as a vain creature requiring those accoutrements.

==== Verse bestiaries ====
Later, bestiary texts appeared which were modified to accommodate the artistic conventions.

It is explained that the siren's "other part" may be "like fish or like bird" in Guillaume le Clerc's Old French verse bestiary (1210 or 1211), (Note: "l'altre partie est figuree / Come peisson ou con oisel" (vv. 1058–1059).) as well as Philip de Thaun's Anglo-Norman verse bestiary (c. 1121–1139).

=== Derivative literature ===
There also appeared medieval works that conflated sirens with mermaids while citing Physiologus as their source. (Note: Hugh of Saint Victor (d.1240), De bestiis et aliis rebus XCVII, quoted in Latin by Mustard (1908), p. 23, and in translation by Holford-Strevens (2006), p. 32: "sirens.., as the Physiologus describes them have a woman's form above down to the navel, but their lower part down to the feet has the shape of a fish". The work continues "excerpts from Servius and Isidore" to say: "three Sirens, part maids, part fish, of whom one sang,..etc.". But despite attribution to Hugh, this work had so heavily interpolated that it has been a 16th century compilation, and dubbed a "problematic" bestiary. Cf. Clark (2006), pp. 10–11: Chapter 1: The Problematic De bestiis et aliis rebus.)

Italian poet Dante Alighieri depicts a siren in Canto 19 of Purgatorio, the second canticle of the Divine Comedy. Here, the pilgrim dreams of a female who is described as "stuttering, cross-eyed, and crooked on her feet, with stunted hands, and pallid in color". It is not until the pilgrim "gazes" upon her that she is turned desirable and is revealed by herself to be a siren. This siren then claims that she "turned Ulysses from his course, desirous of my / song, and whoever becomes used to me rarely / leaves me, so wholly do I satisfy him!" Given that Dante did not have access to the Odyssey, the siren's claim that she turned Ulysses from his course is inherently false because the sirens in the Odyssey do not manage to turn Ulysses from his path. Ulysses and his men were warned by Circe and prepared for their encounter by stuffing their ears full of wax, except for Ulysses, who wishes to be bound to the ship's mast as he wants to hear the siren's song. Scholars claim that Dante may have "misinterpreted" the siren's claim from an episode in Cicero's De finibus. The pilgrim's dream comes to an end when a lady "holy and quick" who had not yet been present before suddenly appears and says, "O Virgil, Virgil, who is this?" Virgil, the pilgrim's guide, then steps forward and tears the clothes from the siren's belly which, "awakened me [the pilgrim] with the stench that issued from it." This marks the ending of the encounter between the pilgrim and the siren.

In Geoffrey of Monmouth's Historia Regum Britanniae (c. 1136), Brutus of Troy encounters sirens at the Pillars of Hercules on his way to Britain to fulfil a prophecy that he will establish an empire there. The sirens surround and nearly overturn his ships until Brutus escapes to the Tyrrhenian Sea.

=== Renaissance ===
By the time of the Renaissance, female court musicians known as courtesans filled the role of an unmarried companion, and musical performances by unmarried women could be seen as immoral. Seen as a creature who could control a man's reason, female singers became associated with the mythological figure of the siren, who usually took a half-human, half-animal form somewhere on the cusp between nature and culture.

Leonardo da Vinci wrote of them in his notebooks, stating "The siren sings so sweetly that she lulls the mariners to sleep; then she climbs upon the ships and kills the sleeping mariners."

=== Age of Exploration ===
However, in the 17th century, some Jesuit writers began to assert their actual existence, including Cornelius a Lapide, who said of woman, "her glance is that of the fabled basilisk, her voice a siren's voice—with her voice she enchants, with her beauty she deprives of reason—voice and sight alike deal destruction and death." Antonio de Lorea also argued for their existence, and Athanasius Kircher argued that compartments must have been built for them aboard Noah's Ark.

=== Late Modernity (1801–1900) ===
Charles Burney expounded c. 1789, in A General History of Music: "The name, according to Bochart, who derives it from the Phoenician, implies a songstress. Hence it is probable, that in ancient times there may have been excellent singers, but of corrupt morals, on the coast of Sicily, who by seducing voyagers, gave rise to this fable."

John Lemprière in his Classical Dictionary (1827) wrote, "Some suppose that the sirens were several lascivious women in Sicily, who prostituted themselves to strangers, and made them forget their pursuits while drowned in unlawful pleasures. The etymology of Bochart, who deduces the name from a Phoenician term denoting a songstress, favours the explanation given of the fable by Damm. This distinguished critic makes the sirens to have been excellent singers, and divesting the fables respecting them of all their terrific features, he supposes that by the charms of music and song, they detained travellers, and made them altogether forgetful of their native land."

== Arts and influence ==
The French impressionist composer, Claude Debussy, composed the orchestral work Nocturnes in which the third movement, "Sirènes", depicts sirens. According to Debussy, "'Sirènes' depicts the sea and its countless rhythms and presently, amongst the waves silvered by the moonlight, is heard the mysterious song of the Sirens as they laugh and pass on".

In 1911, French composer Lili Boulanger composed "Les sirènes" for mezzo-soprano soloist, choir, and piano.

Contemporary British composer and former child prodigy, Alma Deutscher, composed "Waltz of the Sirens", an orchestral work based on the mythological creature.

English artist William Etty portrayed the sirens as young women in fully human form in his 1837 painting The Sirens and Ulysses, a practice copied by future artists.

Sirens in 19th and 20th-century paintings
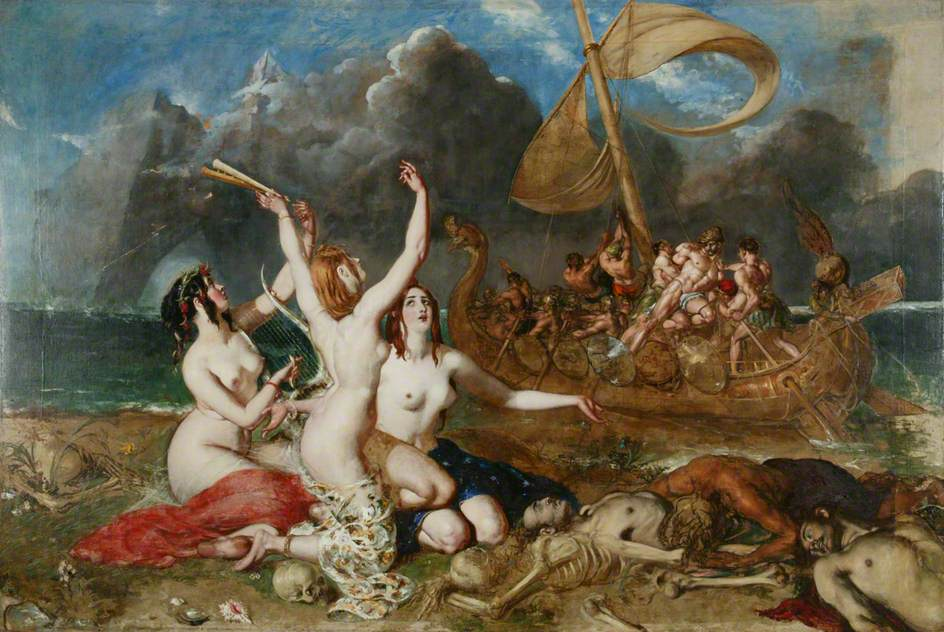
The Sirens and Ulysses (1837) by William Etty

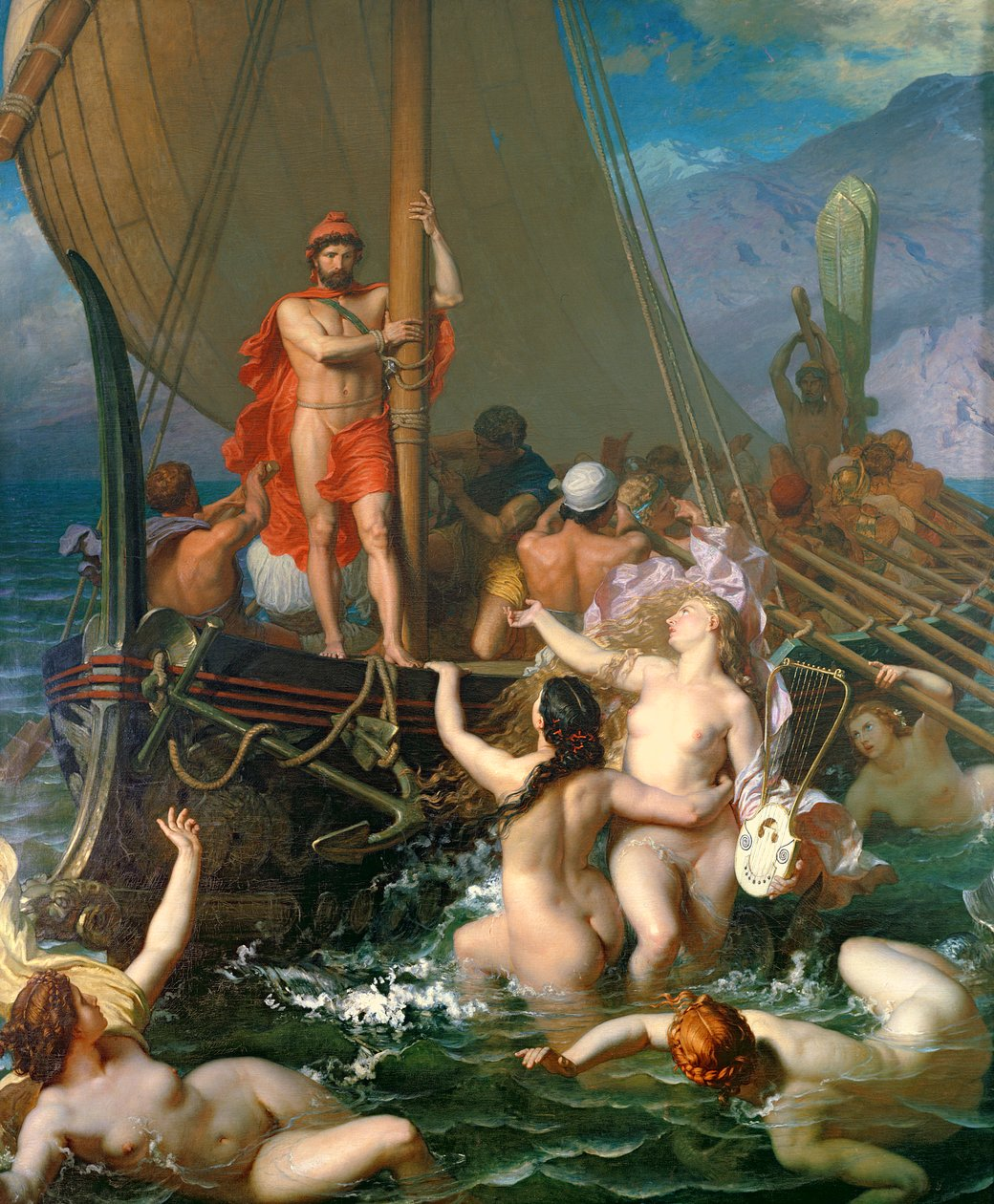
Odysseus and the Sirens (1867) by Léon Belly

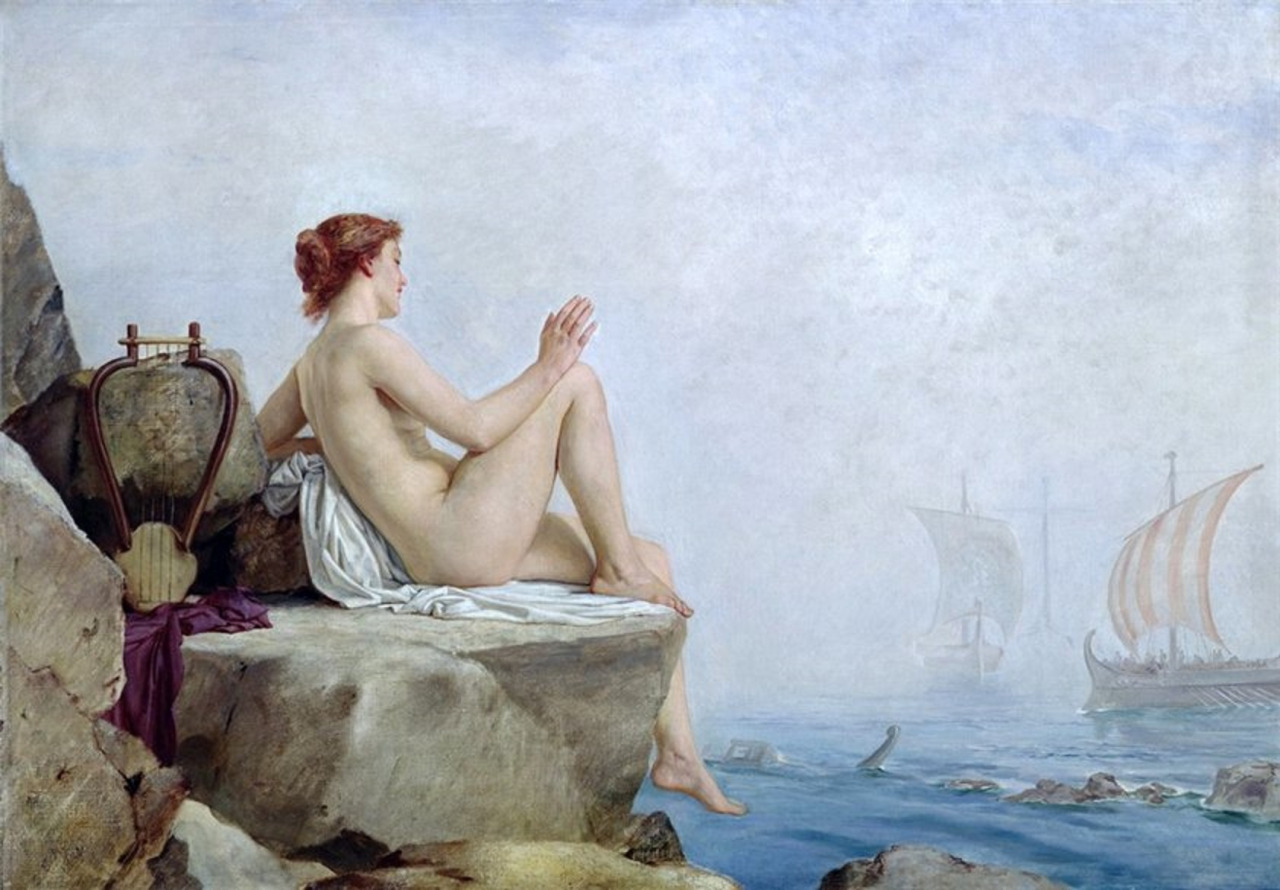
The Siren (1888) by Edward Armitage

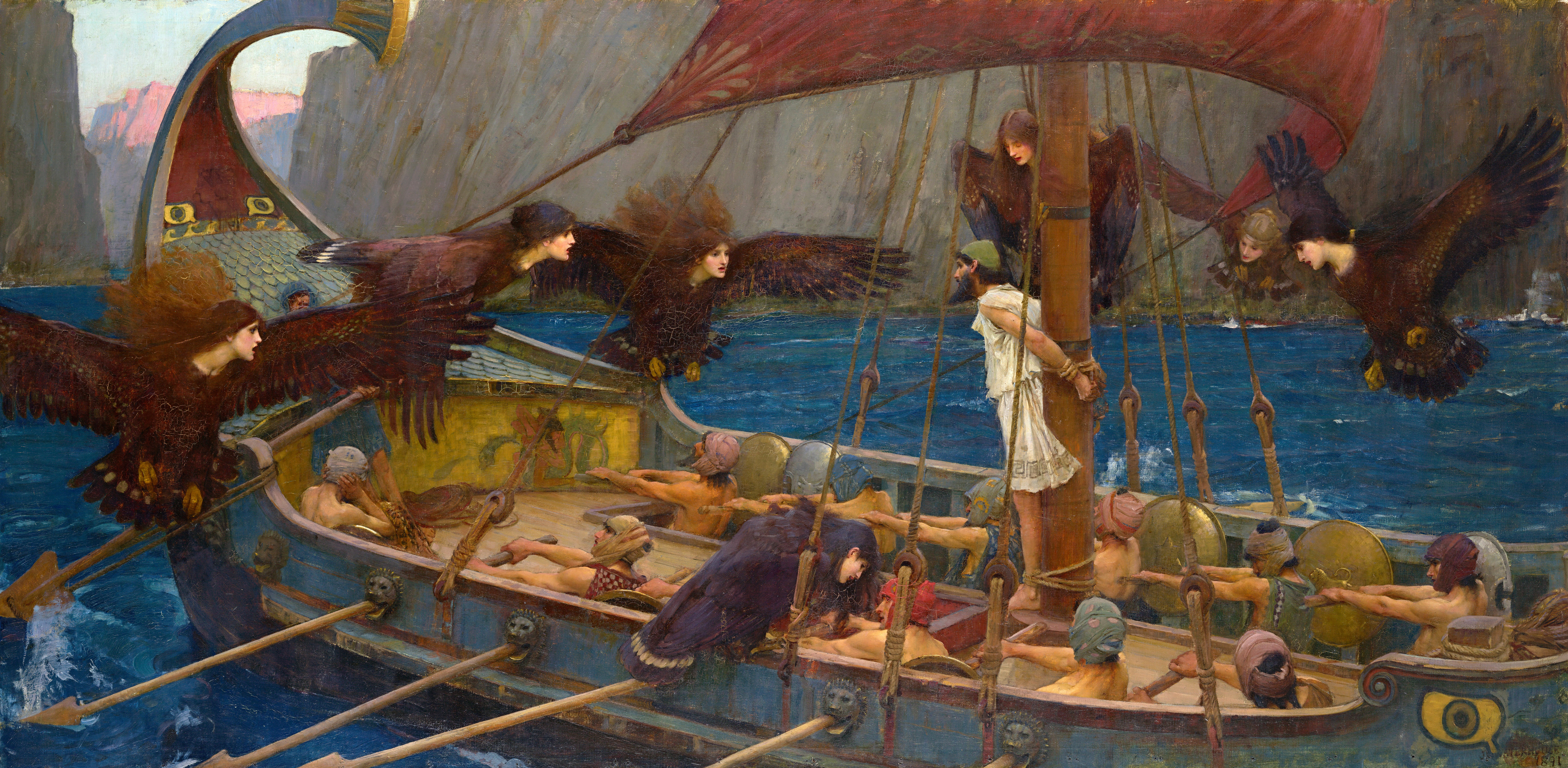
Ulysses and the Sirens (1891) by John William Waterhouse

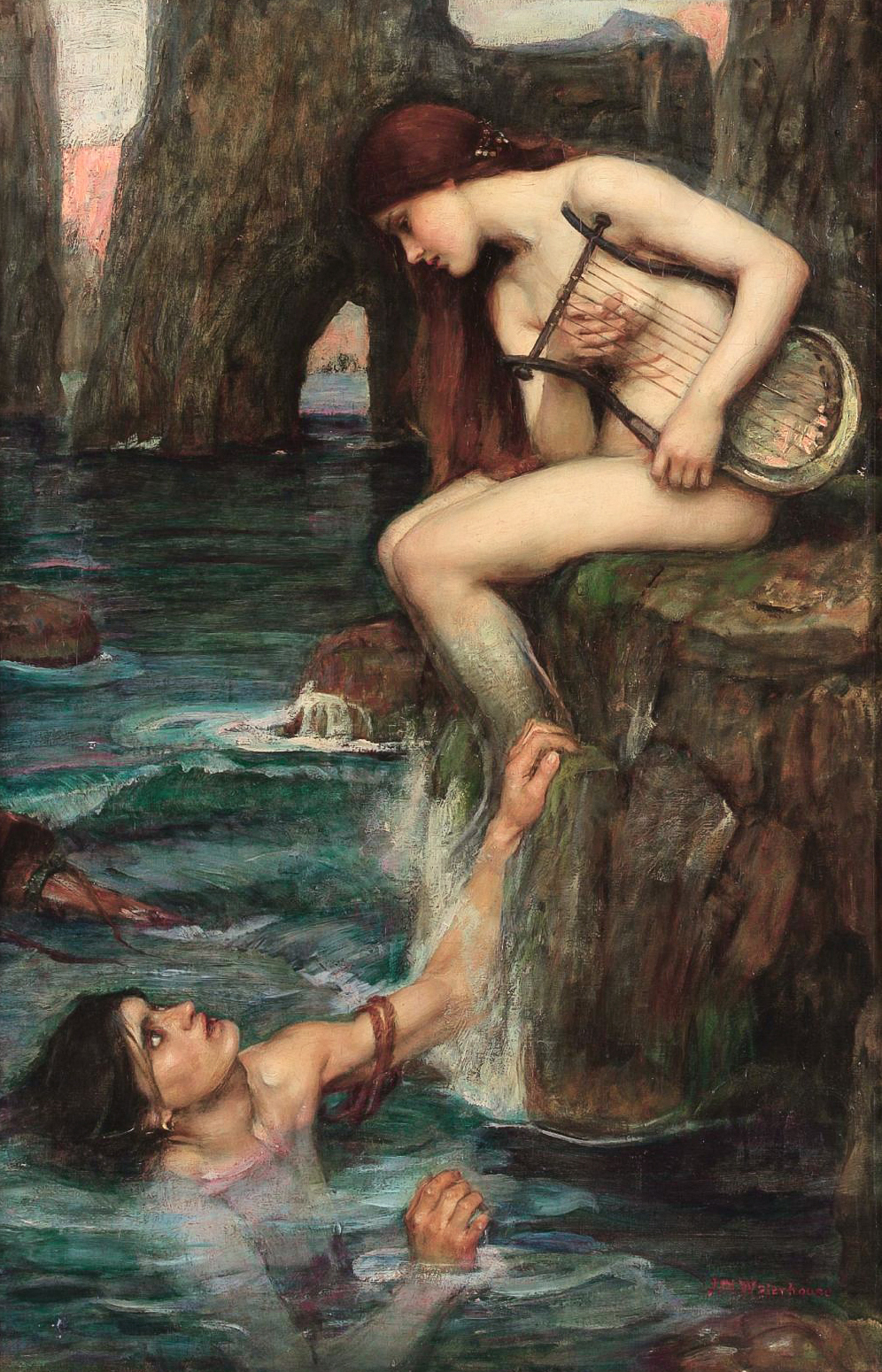
The Siren (c. 1900) by John William Waterhouse

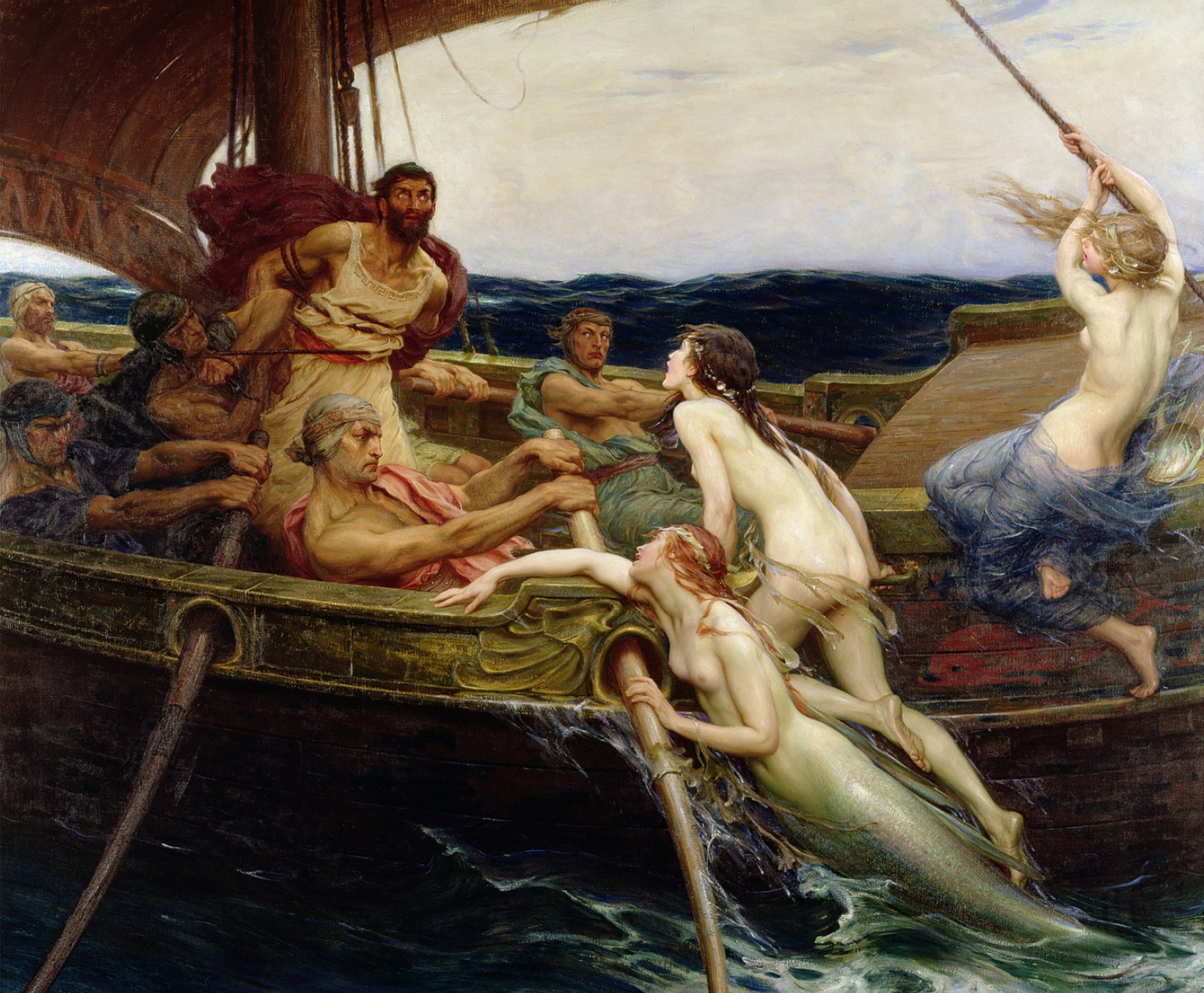
Ulysses and the Sirens (c. 1909) by Herbert James Draper

== See also ==
- Alkonost
- Banshee
- El Naddaha
- Enchanted moura
- Harpy
- Heloi
- Hulder
- Iara
- Kelpie
- La Llorona
- Lilith
- Melusine
- Merrow
- Morgen
- Naiad
- Nereid
- Nixie
- Nymph
- Oceanid
- Pincoya
- Rusalka
- Seraphim
- Sihuanaba
- Sirena
- Sirin
- Succubus
- Trauco
- List of avian humanoids
