= Ocalea (river) =

River of Boeotia, Greece

The Ocalea or Okalea (Ancient Greek: Ὠκαλέα) was a river of ancient Boeotia, flowing midway between Haliartus and Alalcomenae, with the town of Ocalea upon its banks. William Martin Leake who visited the area in the 19th century, describes it as rising in the eastern part of Mount Leibethrium, and issuing through a precipitous gorge lying between the eastern end of Mount Tilphossium and a rocky peak.
