= Istros =

Istros may refer to:

- Istros the Callimachean – Greek author, whose writings survive only in fragments

== Geography ==
- Istros (island), island in the Aegean Sea
- Histria or Istros, an ancient Greek colony on the western shore of the Black Sea, Romania
- The ancient Greek name for the lower section of the Danube, Europe's second longest river
- In Greek mythology, one of the river gods, descended from the Titans Oceanus and Tethys, associated with the Istros River (modern Danube).

== Culture ==
- Istros Books, a London-based publisher of books from the Balkans in English translation
