= Ligeia (mythology) =

Greek mythological figures

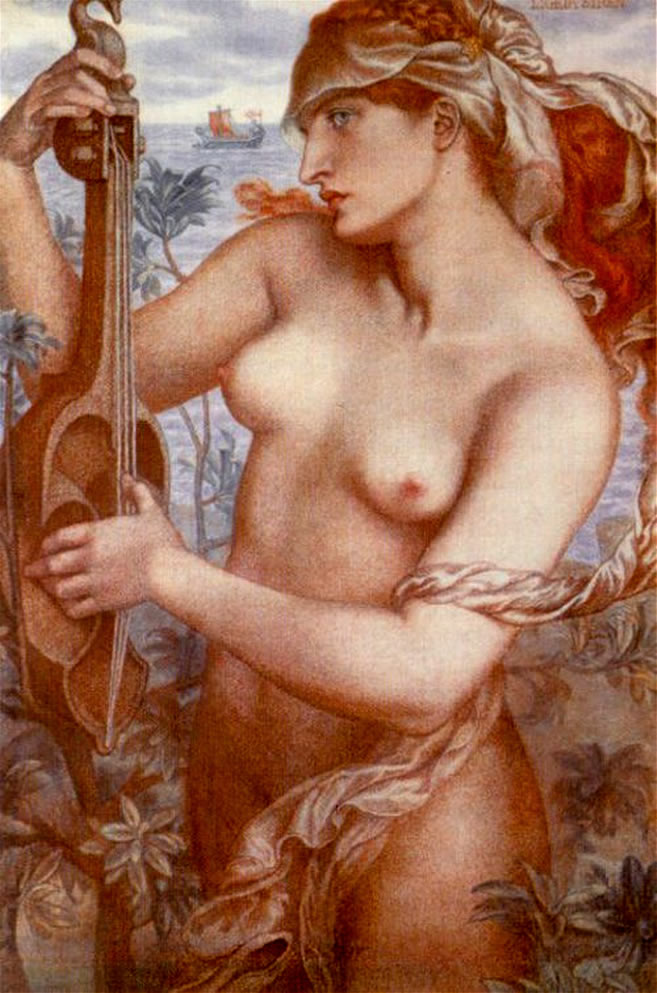
Ligeia Siren by Dante Gabriel Rossetti (1873)

In Greek mythology, Ligeia or Ligia (Ancient Greek: Λίγεια, romanized: Lígeia) may refer to two personages:

- Ligea, one of the 50 Nereids, sea-nymph daughters of the Old Man of the Sea, Nereus and the Oceanid Doris. She was one of the nymphs in the train of Cyrene. Ligeia was described to have bright, waving locks of hair and a slender pale neck.
- Ligeia, one of the Sirens. She was the daughter of the river-god Achelous and the Muse Melpomene or her sister Terpsichore. Ligeia's sisters were Parthenope and Leucosia or Thelxipeia and Peisinoe. She was found ashore of Terina in Bruttium (modern Calabria).
