= Alalcomeneis =

Ancient Greek mythological epithet

AlalcomeneÏs (Ancient Greek: Ἀλαλκομενηίς means 'guardian') was an epithet of the Greek goddess Athena, the origin of which was subject to several theories. Some derived it from the name of the hero Alalcomenes, or from the Boeotian village of Alalcomenae, where in some traditions she was said to have been born. In or near that town there was a temple of Athena Alalcomeneis that was plundered by the Roman general Sulla in the early 1st century BC. After he removed the temple's main icon, an ivory statue of the goddess, the place fell into disuse and disrepair. In the early 19th century, William Martin Leake claimed ruins of the temple could still be seen.

Others derive the name from the Greek verb alalkein (ἀλαλκεῖν, "to protect") so that it would signify the "powerful defender".
