= Calydnus =

In Greek mythology, Kalydnos (Ancient Greek: Κάλυδνος, Latinized as Calydnus) was a son of Uranus and the first king of Thebes, after whom the city was thought to have been called Calydna. He was believed to have built the first fortifications of the city, which was why Thebes were sometimes referred to as the "citadel of Calydnus". Calydnus was succeeded by Ogygus.

A certain Calydnus was also the mythical eponym of the island Calydna near Troy.
