= Sirenum Scopuli =

Home of the sirens in Greek mythology

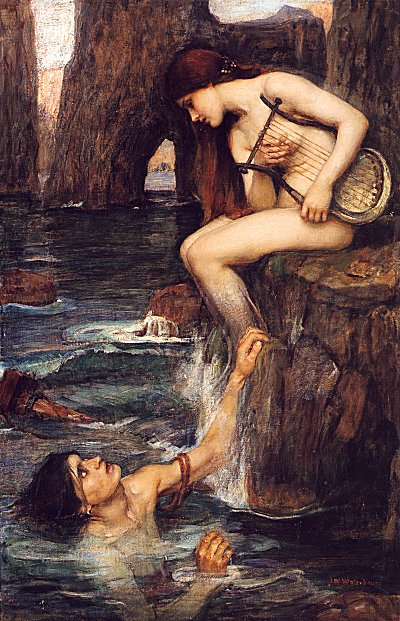
Painting of a siren (The Siren by John William Waterhouse)

According to the Roman poets Virgil (Aeneid, 5.864) and Ovid, the Sirenum Scopuli were three small rocky islands where the sirens of Greek mythology lived and lured sailors to their deaths. "The Sirenum Scopuli are sharp rocks that stand about a stone's throw from the south side of the island" of Capri, was Joseph Addison's confident identification.

Diverse locations were assigned to the isles of the sirens by various authorities. According to Homer's Odyssey, they were between Aeaea and the rock of Scylla. Often they have been placed in the Tyrrhenian Sea, off the coast of south-western Italy near Paestum or between Sorrento and Capri: "three small islands on the southwest coast of Campania, now Licosa, St. Pietro and La Galetta", reported George Richard Crooks and Christian Frederik Ingersley on the basis of Alexander Jacob Schem, A New Latin-English School-Lexicon (Philadelphia), 1861 s.v. "Siren".

Similarly, Anthemoessa (or Anthemusa) was the island home of the sirens in other versions of the myth. Although the name no longer exists, varying accounts attribute Anthemoessa to the island of Ischia or Capri, in the Gulf of Naples.

Further traditions place the sirens on Capo Peloro or the Sirenuse islands, near Paestum.

All locations were described to be surrounded by cliffs and rocks.
