= Pisinoe =

Set of mythological Greek characters

In Greek mythology, Pisinoe or Peisinoe (Ancient Greek: Πεισινόη, romanized: Peisinóē, lit. 'affecting-the-mind', from peisis and noos) may refer to two individuals:

- Pisinoe (Siren), also called Peisithoe (Πεισιθόη), one of the Sirens. She was attested as a daughter of the river-god Achelous and the Muse Melpomene or Sterope, daughter of King Porthaon of Calydon. She may have two sisters, variously named as Thelxiepeia and Aglaope or Molpe or Ligea.
- Pisinoe, a girl living in the neighbourhood of Harmonia, wife of Cadmus.
