= Aulis (mythology) =

Character in Greek mythology

In Greek mythology, Aulis (Ancient Greek: Αὐλίς, romanized: Aulís, lit. 'place to spend the night', 'resting place', 'encampment', 'tent' or 'roosting-place') was the eponym of the Boeotian town of Aulis.

== Mythology ==
Aulis was a daughter of King Ogyges of Boeotia. Her sisters were Alacomenia and Thelxinoea, collectively called Praxidicae, goddesses who watched over oaths.

Other traditions called Aulis a daughter of Euonymus, the son of the river-god Cephissus or of Gaea and Uranus.
