= Alistra (mythology) =

Character in Greek mythology

In Greek mythology, Alistra (Ancient Greek: Άλίστρα, romanized: Alístra) was one of Poseidon's lovers who bore him Ogyges, an ancient Boeotian king.
