= Cabeirus =

Set index article on Greek mythology

In Greek mythology, Cabeirus or Cabeiros (Ancient Greek: Κάβειρος, romanized: Kábeiros, Kabeiros or Cabirus) may refer to two distinct figures:

- Cabeirus, the "fair child of secret orgies" born from earth (Gaia, i.e. an autochthon) in Lemnos. He was said to the father of Sabazius, the third Dionysus, who reigned in Asia and established the Sabazian mysteries (Sabazia). Cabirus was often worshipped alongside a younger divine boy (Pais), representing an older deity comparable to Dionysus or a divine father figure. He was also honoured among Macedonians.
- Cabeirus, a friend of Paris who came from Sestos, a city in the Thracian Chersonesus, to fight at Troy against the Achaeans. He was killed by the Achaean leader Sthenelus from Argos.
