= Alalcomenia =

Ancient Greek mythological figure

Alalcomenia (Ancient Greek: Ἀλαλκομενία) was, in Greek mythology, one of the daughters of Ogyges and the eponym of Alalcomenae. She and her two sisters, Thelxionoea and Aulis, were regarded as supernatural beings who watched over oaths and saw that they were not taken rashly or thoughtlessly. Their name was the Praxidikai (Πραξιδίκαι), and they had a temple in common at the foot of the Telphusian mount in Boeotia.

These three were sometimes rendered as a single goddess, Praxidike, "she who exacts punishment". The representations of these divinities consisted of bodiless heads. Like other Greek deities, animals were sacrificed to them, but only the heads.
