= Ocalea (town) =

Coordinates: 38°21′05″N 23°02′16″E

Map of ancient Boeotia.

Ocalea or Okalea (Ancient Greek: Ὠκαλέα, romanized: Ōkalea, rarely Ὠκαλέαι), later Ocaleia or Okaleia (Ὠκάλεια), was a town in ancient Boeotia, Greece. It lay in the middle of a long narrow plain, situated upon a small stream of the same name, bounded on the east by the heights of Haliartus, on the west by the mountain Tilphossium, on the south by a range of low hills, and on the north by the Lake Copais.

Ocalea lay roughly halfway between Alalcomenae and Haliartus, about 30 stadia (5.5 km) from each. Ancient sources often mention it alongside Mantinea and Medeon, which suggests that they were close by. The short distance between Mantinea and Ocalea seems to be the reason why the mythical figure Aglaïa, daughter of Mantineus, was sometimes also known as Ocalea. This town was dependent upon Haliartus.

Its site is tentatively located near modern Evangelistria.

== Origins ==
Most sources that discuss the origin of the town's name explain it as coming from the Greek adjective ὠκύς, "quick". The early "D" scholia on the Iliad explain this as a reference to an unnamed river flowing past it; the geographical writer Stephanus of Byzantium explains it as a reference to the brief journey from the nearby town Thespiae to Thebes.

== Mythology ==
The Hymn to Apollo narrates how the god Apollo, in his search for a place to establish his oracle, passes by Ocalea and Haliartus after crossing the river Cephissus on his way to Telphousa. Ocalea and Haliartus are named in the wrong order, since Apollo is supposed to be travelling westwards. The poem describes Ocalea as πολύπυργος, "many-towered"; but the epithet is so common as to be almost meaningless.

The Library falsely attributed to Apollodorus of Athens tells the story of how when Heracles fought the Minyans of Orchomenus, his foster-father Amphitryon was killed. After this Zeus' son Rhadamanthys, who had been exiled from Crete, married Amphitryon's widow, Alcmene, and they settled in Ocalea. Tzetzes adds that in Ocalea Rhadamanthys taught the young Heracles to shoot a bow.

The Homeric Iliad mentions Ocalea in the Catalogue of Ships as one of the towns that contributed to the Boeotian contingent of the Greek army in the Trojan War.
