= Alalkomenes railway station =

Railway station in Greece

Αλαλκομενές Alalkomenes

General information
- Location: Alalkomenes, Livadeia; Greece
- Coordinates: 38°24′30″N 22°58′57″E
- Owner: GAIAOSE
- Operator: Hellenic Train
- Line: Piraeus–Platy railway
- Platforms: 2
- Tracks: 2
- Train operators: Hellenic Train

Construction
- Structure type: at-grade
- Platform levels: 1
- Parking: Yes
- Cycle facilities: No

Other information
- Status: Unstaffed
- Website: http://www.ose.gr/en/

History
- Opened: 8 March 1904; 122 years ago
- Electrified: 25 kV AC, 50 Hz
- Former names: Mamoura (Before 1928)

Services
Preceding station	Hellenic Train	Following station
Ypsilantis towards Athens	G1 Athens-Leianokladi via Bralos	Livadeia towards Leianokladi
Location
- Location within Greece

Alalkomenes railway station (Greek: Σιδηροδρομικός Σταθμός Αλαλκομενών, romanized: Sidirodromikós stathmós Alalkomenai) is a railway station situated just outside the Alalkomenes, Boeotia, Greece. The station also serves the town of Agios Georgios, which is 5 kilometres (3.1 mi) east of the station. The station opened on 8 March 1904 It is served by local trains to Athens and Leianokladi.

== History ==
The station opened on 8 March 1904., as (Greek: Σιδηροδρομικός Σταθμός Μαμούρα, romanized: Sidirodromikós stathmós Mamoura) The station was built by the "British Company of Lake Kopaida" (Lake Copais Co Ltd) which had undertaken the drainage of the lake in the 19th century. It is one of the few buildings constructed by the company and exists to this day, having been designated as a protected monument.

In 1920 Hellenic State Railways or SEK was established, and the line became part of the network. The station's name, along with the settlement, was changed around 1928. During the Axis occupation of Greece (1941–44), Athens was controlled by German military forces, and the line used for the transport of troops and weapons. During the occupation (and especially during the German withdrawal in 1944), the network was severely damaged by both the German army and Greek resistance groups. The track and rolling stock replacement took time following the civil war, with normal service levels resumed around 1948.

In 1970 OSE became the legal successor to the SEK, taking over responsibilities for most of Greece's rail infrastructure. On 1 January 1971, the station and most of the Greek rail infrastructure were transferred to the Hellenic Railways Organisation S.A., a state-owned corporation. Freight traffic declined sharply when the state-imposed monopoly of OSE for the transport of agricultural products and fertilisers ended in the early 1990s. Many small stations of the network with little passenger traffic were closed down. It was during this time that buslike shelters were installed on both platforms.

In 2001 the infrastructure element of OSE was created, known as GAIAOSE; it would henceforth be responsible for the maintenance of stations, bridges and other elements of the network, as well as the leasing and the sale of railway assists. In 2005, TrainOSE was created as a brand within OSE to concentrate on rail services and passenger interface. In 2009, with the Greek debt crisis unfolding, OSE's management was forced to reduce services across the network. Timetables were cutback and routes closed, as the government-run entity attempted to reduce overheads. In 2017 OSE's passenger transport sector was privatised as TrainOSE, currently a wholly owned subsidiary of Ferrovie dello Stato Italiane infrastructure, including stations, remained under the control of OSE. In July 2022, the station began being served by Hellenic Train, the rebranded TranOSE

In September 2023, due in part to storm Danial services were severely disrupted between Oinoi - Tithorea when power was disrupted on that section of line, which led to long delays thought the evening.

The station building is owned by GAIAOSE, which since 3 October 2001 owns most railway stations in Greece: the company was also in charge of rolling stock from December 2014 until October 2025, when Greek Railways (the owner of the Piraeus–Platy railway) took over that responsibility.

== Facilities ==
The station is still housed in a 20th-century brick-built station building, but this is now in disrepair. The Station is currently (2022) not equipped with toilets or a staffed ticket office. Access to the platforms is via crossing the lines. At platform level, there are sheltered seating but no Dot-matrix display departure or arrival screens or timetable poster boards on all platforms. Currently, there is no local bus stop connecting the station.

== Services ==
It is served by Regional services between Athens and Leianokladi. The station sees around 2 trains per-day.

== Station layout ==
Level; L1	Side platform, doors will open on the right
Level; L1	Platform 1	← towards Leianokladi (Livadia)
Level; L1	Platform 2	towards Athens (Ypsilantis) →
Level; L1	Side platform, doors will open on the right

== See also ==
- Railway stations in Greece
- Hellenic Railways Organization
- Hellenic Train
- Proastiakos
- P.A.Th.E./P.
