= Alalcomenae (Ithaca) =

Ancient town on Ithaca, Greece

Coordinates: 38°21′20″N 20°41′01″E

Alalcomenae or Alalkomenai (Ancient Greek: Ἀλαλκομ́εναι), or Alcomenae or Alkomenai (Ἀλκομεναί), was a town in Ithaca, or in the small island Asteris in the neighbourhood of Ithaca.

According to Istros the Callimachean, Anticlea gave birth to Odysseus near Alalcomenae in Boeotia; consequently, Odysseus named an Ithacan town Alalcomenae in commemoration of his birthplace.

Its site is located at the palaiokastro on modern Aëtos.

== See also ==
- List of ancient Greek cities
