= Molpe =

In Greek mythology, Molpe (Ancient Greek: Μολπή, romanized: Molpê, lit. 'song', 'melody' or 'dance') refers to the following characters:

- Molpe, one of three Sirens and sister to Thelxiope and Aglaophonos.
- Molpe, listed as one of the Maenads, female followers of Dionysus, according to various vase paintings.
