= Leucosia (mythology) =

One of the Sirens in Greek mythology

In Greek mythology, Leucosia (Ancient Greek: Λευκωσία, romanized: Leukōsía, lit. 'white-stuff', from λευκή, leukḗ, 'white') was one of the Sirens. She was the daughter of the river-god Achelous by either the Muses, Melpomene or Terpsichore. Leucosia's sisters were Parthenope and Ligeia. Leucosia's name was given to the island opposite to the Sirens' cape, the modern Licosa. Her body was found on the shore of Poseidonia.

Ancient scholiasts recorded several etymologies for the name Leucosia: she was said to be "the White One" (from the Greek leukos, "white"), to have white ears, to be the daughter of a certain Leucus, or to have the ears of Leucus.
