= Palaechthon =

Father of Pelasgus in Greek mythology

In Greek mythology, Palaechthon or Palaichthon (Ancient Greek: Παλαίχθονος, lit. 'long in the land') was the father of Pelasgus, king of Argos and eponym of the Pelasgians.

== Aeschylus ==
In The Suppliants, Aeschylus (5th century BC) writes that:

For I am Pelasgus, offspring of Palaechthon, whom the earth brought forth, and lord of this land; and after me, their king, is rightly named the race of the Pelasgi, who harvest the land.

Palaechthon is not mentioned outside of this passage by Aeschylus, who seems to have invented him.
