= Alalcomeneus (mythology) =

Ancient Greek mythological figure

Alalcomenes (Ancient Greek: Ἀλαλκομένης) or Alalcomeneus (Ancient Greek: Ἀλαλκομενεύς, lit. 'guardian' or 'powerful defender') was in Greek mythology, a Boeotian autochthon who was believed to have given the name to the Boeotian town of Alalcomenae.

== Mythology ==
Alalcomeneus was also said to have brought-up/ tutored Athena (under the epithet Athena Alalcomeneis), who was in some traditions said to have been born in that town, and to have been the first who introduced her worship. According to Plutarch, he advised Zeus to have a figure of oak-wood dressed in bridal attire, and carried about amidst hymnal songs, in order to change the anger of Hera into jealousy. The name of the wife of Alalcomenes was Athenaïs, and that of his son, Glaucopus, both of which refer to the goddess Athena. In another account, Alalcomeneus' spouse was called Niobe.

In some accounts, Alalcomenes was said to be the first man who appeared by Lake Copais before even the Moon was. He sprang spontaneously from the earth (Gaia) rather than being created by Prometheus and thus one of the men of the so-called golden race, subjects of Cronus.

Robert Graves interpreted Alalcomeneus as a patriarchal insertion derived from the epithet of Athena, as part of his theory of a suppressed pre-Greek matriarchal religion.
