= Tilphossaeum =

Coordinates: 38°22′16″N 22°59′40″E

Tilphossaeum or Tilphossaion (Ancient Greek: Τιλφώσσαιον), also Tilphosaeum or Tilphosaion (Τιλφώσαιον or ΤιλΦωσαΐον), or Tilphusium or Tilphousion (Τιλφούσιον), was a fortress in ancient Boeotia that commanded the narrow pass between Mount Tilphossium and Lake Copais, which pass was one of great importance in antiquity, as the high road from northern Greece to Thebes passed through it.

Its site is tentatively located near modern Palaiothiva.
