= Ectenes =

Ancient people in Boiotia

The Ectenes or Hectenes (Ancient Greek: Ἑκτῆνες) were, in Greek mythology, the autochthones or earliest inhabitants of Boeotia, where the city of Thebes would later be founded.

According to Pausanias, writing from his travels in Boeotia in the 2nd century CE, "The first to occupy the land of Thebes are said to have been the Ectenes, whose king was Ogygus, an aboriginal."
