= Ogyges =

Primeval mythological ruler in ancient Greece

- King of Boeotia
- Other names: Ogygus
- Predecessor: Calydnus
- Successor: ?Cadmus
- Abode: Boeotia

Genealogy
- Parents: ?autochthon; Poseidon and Alistra; Boeotus; ?Cadmus
- Siblings: unknown
- Consort: Thebe
- Offspring: Eleusis, ?Cadmus, Aulis, Alalcomenia, and Thelxinia

Ogyges, also spelled Ogygus (Ancient Greek: Ὠγύγης or Ὤγυγος, romanized: Ogygos; pronounced /ō-jij′ē-ēz/ or /əʊˈdʒɪdʒiːz/, oh-JIJ-eez; pronounced /ˈɒdʒɪɡəs/ or /ˈɒdʒɪdʒəs/, ODD-juh-jeez or ODD-juh-gus) is a primeval mythological ruler in ancient Greece, generally of Boeotia, but an alternative tradition makes him the first king of Attica.

== Etymology ==
Though the original etymology and meaning are uncertain, the name Ogyges may be related to the Greek Okeanos (Ὠκεανός), the Titan who personified the great world ocean. The Greek word Ogygios (Ὠγύγιος), meaning Ogygian, came to mean "primeval, primal," or "from earliest ages" and also "gigantic".

== Family ==
Stories of Ogyges's descent differs widely. Besides Ogyges being one of the aborigines of Boeotia, there are tales that regard him as the son of Poseidon (by Alistra), Boeotus or even Cadmus. In one account, Ogygias (a variant of Ogyges) was referred as the son of Zeus and Eurynome, daughter of Asopus. Theophilus, in the 2nd century (Apologia ad Autolycum), says he was one of the Titans.

Ogyges' children are listed variously as two sons: Eleusinus (for whom the city Eleusis was named) and Cadmus (noted above as his father in other traditions); and three daughters: Aulis, Alalcomenia, and Thelxinia.

== Mythology ==
=== Reign ===
Ogyges is also known as king of the Ectenes, who according to Pausanias were the first inhabitants of Boeotia, where the city of Thebes would later be founded. As such, he became the first ruler of Thebes, which was, in that early time, named Ogygia (Ὠγυγία) after him. Subsequently, poets referred to the Thebans as Ogygidae (Ὠγυγίδαι). Pausanias, writing from his travels in Boeotia in the 2nd century CE, said: "The first to occupy the land of Thebes are said to have been the Ectenes, whose king was Ogygus, an aboriginal. From his name is derived Ogygian, which is an epithet of Thebes used by most of the poets."

In yet another version of the story, the Boeotian tradition is combined with that of another part of Greece: Ogyges was king of the Ectenes, who were the first people to occupy Boeotia, but he and his people later settled the area then known as Acte (Akte). The land was subsequently called Ogygia in his honor but later known as Mount Athos. Sextus Julius Africanus, writing after 221 CE, adds that Ogyges founded Eleusis. In one account, his predecessor was called Kalydnos, son of Ouranos.

According to Africanus, Ogygus lived at the time of the Exodus of the House of Israel from Egypt.

Ogyges is possibly the namesake for the phantom island Ogygia, mentioned in Homer's Odyssey. A long-standing tradition begun by Euhemerus in the late 4th century BC and supported by Callimachus, endorsed by modern Maltese tradition, identifies Ogygia with the island of Gozo, the second largest island in the Maltese archipelago. Another possibility for the island is the Niobid named Ogygia.

The historian Josephus mentions Ogyges as the name of the oak by which the Hebrew patriarch Abram dwelt while he lived near Hebron. Furthermore, Og, also called "Ogias the Giant", who was king of Bashan in the Old Testament; was described as a giant in Deut 3:11, viewed by the Hebrews as having aided Noah in building the Ark, thus Noah allowed him to stay on the deck of the Ark.

=== The deluge of Ogyges ===
Map of ancient Boeotia. The area around the Lake Copais down to Attica is related with the Ogygian deluge

The first worldwide flood in Greek mythology, the Ogygian deluge occurred during his reign and derives its name from him, though some sources regard it as a local flood, such as an inundation of Lake Copais, a large lake once in the center of Boeotia. Other sources see it as a flood associated with Attica. This latter view was accepted by Africanus, who says "that great and first flood occurred in Attica, when Phoroneus was king of Argos, as Acusilaus relates."

When this deluge has been considered global, a similarity is noticed with Noah's flood in the Bible. Various dates have been assigned to the event, including 2136 BCE (Varro), and 1793 BCE (Africanus).

Ogyges survived the deluge but many people perished. After his death, the devastated Attica was without kings for 189 years, until the time of Cecrops (Cecrops Diphyes). Africanus says, "But after Ogyges, on account of the great destruction caused by the flood, what is now called Attica remained without a king one hundred and eighty-nine years until the time of Cecrops. For Philochorus asserts that that Actaeon who comes after Ogyges, and the fictitious names, never even existed."

It seems the deluge of Deucalion of Greek-mythology is the Greek version of the older legend. Deucalion and Pyrrha were the only survivors after the great deluge. Their son Hellen, who became ruler of Phthia in southern Thessaly, was the patriarch of the Hellenes.

== See also ==
- Mamre: the oak of Mamre is called Ogyges by Josephus Flavius
- Minyans
