= Tilphossium =

Ancient mountain of Boeotia, Greece

Coordinates: 38°22′16″N 22°59′40″E

Tilphossium or Tilphossion (Ancient Greek: Τιλφώσσιον or Τιλφωσσαῖον), or Tilphusium or Tilphousion (Τιλφούσιον), was a mountain on the southern side of Lake Copais, between the plains of Haliartus and Coroneia, maybe regarded as the furthest offshoot of Mount Helicon, with which it is connected using Mount Leibethrium. At the foot of the hill was the small fountain Tilphossa or Tilphussa, where the seer Tiresias is said to have died. Tilphusium was also the name of a town situated upon the Tilphossium mountain.

The hill bears the form of a letter T, with its foot turned towards the north. From its position between the lake and Leibethrium, there is a narrow pass on either side of the hill. The pass between Tilphossium and the lake was one of great importance in antiquity, as the high road from northern Greece to Thebes passed through it. This pass was very narrow, and was completely commanded by the fortress Tilphossaeum or Tilphusium, on the summit of the hill.
