= Alalkomenes, Boeotia =

Alalkomenes Αλαλκομενές
- Community
- Location within Greece
- Coordinates: 38°24′36″N 22°59′10″E
- Country: Greece
- Administrative region: Central Greece
- Regional unit: Boeotia
- Municipality: Livadeia
- Municipal unit: Koroneia

Population (2021)
  - Community: 116
- Time zone: UTC+2 (EET)
  - Summer (DST): UTC+3 (EEST)

Alalkomenes (Greek: Αλαλκομενές; before 1928: Μαμούρα Mamoura) is a village and a community in the municipality of Livadeia, Boeotia, central Greece. It is situated in a wide plain, 6 km northeast of Koroneia, 10 km east of Livadeia and 30 km west of Thebes. The community Alalkomenes consists of the villages Alalkomenes and Agios Athanasios. The population of the community was 116 in 2021.

== Population ==
Historical population

Year	Pop.	±% p.a.
1835	127	—
1861	183	+1.41%
1879	126	−2.05%
1889	143	+1.27%
1896	186	+3.83%
1907	154	−1.70%
1920	253	+3.89%
1928	310	+2.57%
1940	476	+3.64%

Year	Pop.	±% p.a.
1951	409	−1.37%
1961	435	+0.62%
1971	303	−3.55%
1981	296	−0.23%
1991	324	+0.91%
2001	191	−5.15%
2011	178	−0.70%
2021	116	−4.19%

Source: Censuses

== History ==
Map of ancient Boeotia

In 1928 the village Mamoura was renamed Alalkomenes after the nearby ancient town of Alalcomenae, that existed in the vicinity. The village became a separate community (together with Agios Athanasios) in 1928, when it was split from the community of Vrastamites. In 1997 it became part of the municipality of Koroneia, which merged into the municipality of Livadeia in 2010.

== Transport ==
The village is served by Alalkomenes railway station, with local stopping services to Leianokladi and Athens.
