= Koroneia, Boeotia =

Koroneia Κορώνεια
- Municipal unit
- Location within the regional unit

- Location within Greece
- Coordinates: 38°21′N 22°58′E
- Country: Greece
- Administrative region: Central Greece
- Regional unit: Boeotia
- Municipality: Livadeia

Area
  - Municipal unit: 190.535 km^{2} (73.566 sq mi)
  - Community: 32.178 km^{2} (12.424 sq mi)

Population (2021)
  - Municipal unit: 2,609
  - Municipal unit density: 13.69/km^{2} (35.46/sq mi)
  - Community: 277
  - Community density: 8.61/km^{2} (22.3/sq mi)
- Time zone: UTC+2 (EET)
  - Summer (DST): UTC+3 (EEST)
- Vehicle registration: ΒΙ

Koroneia (Greek: Κορώνεια, before 1915: Κουτουμουλάς - Koutoumoulas) is a village and a former municipality in Boeotia, Greece. Since the 2011 local government reform it is part of the municipality Livadeia, of which it is a municipal unit. The population of the municipal unit was 2,609 at the 2021 census.

== Geography ==
The municipal unit Koroneia consists of the following communities: Agios Georgios (the seat of the former municipality), Agia Anna, Agia Triada, Alalkomenes and Koroneia. The community Koroneia consists of the villages Koroneia and Agia Paraskevi. The municipal unit has an area of 190.535 km^{2}, the community 32.178 km^{2}.

The village Koroneia is situated at the northern foot of the Helicon Mountains. It is 11 km southeast of Livadeia.

== Population history ==
Year	Population community	Population municipal unit
1991	899	-
2001	597	4,625
2011	386	3,170
2021	277	2,609

== History ==
Koroneia was named after the ancient town Coronea or Coroneia (Ancient Greek: Κορώνεια). According to tradition, the ancient town was founded by Coronus, son of Thersander and brother of Haliartus. It was also said to have been founded by Boeotians from the town Arne in Thessaly.

In the Battle of Coronea (447 BC), Athenian forces under Tolmides were defeated by the Boeotians.

In the Battle of Coronea (394 BC) a force of Spartans and their allies under King Agesilaus II — Xenophon being with him — defeated a force of Thebans and Argives.

In the Third Sacred War (356 BC–346 BC) Coronea was twice taken by the Phocians under Onomarchus. Pausanias, who travelled through the area in the second century AD, found an altar of Hermes Epimelius and an altar to the winds in the market place of Coronea. A little lower down was a sanctuary of Hera.

The only historically identifiable bishops of Coronea are Agathocles, who took part in the Council of Ephesus in 431 BC, and Aphobius, who was a signatory of the joint letter sent by the bishops of the Roman province to which Coronea belonged to Byzantine Emperor Leo I the Thracian in 458 BC concerning the killing of Proterius of Alexandra. No longer a residential bishopric, Coronea is today listed by the Catholic Church as a titular see.

The village Koutoumoulas was first mentioned in 1756. After the Greek War of Independence, the village was the seat of a short-lived (1835-1840) municipality Koroneia. Between 1840 and 1912 it was the seat of the municipality Petra. In 1912, Koutoumoulas became an independent community, which was renamed to Koroneia in 1915. This community became part of the larger municipality Koroneia in 1997, which became part of the municipality of Livadeia in 2010.
