= Istros the Callimachean =

Ancient Greek historian

Istros the Callimachean (Ancient Greek: Ἴστρος ὁ Καλλιμάχειος) was a Greek writer, probably from Paphos. He was a pupil of Callimachus, and active in the Library of Alexandria. Seventy-seven fragments of his writings remain, mostly from his four-volume Attica, which discussed the cult, religion, and institutions of Attica in its mythical past, based largely on Atthides. According to the Suda, a 10th-century encyclopedia, he wrote both prose and verse.

== Works ==
Istros' works exist only in fragments (FGrHist 334). Among his attested works are:

- Attika (Ἀττικά)
- Atakta (Ἄτακτα)
- Attikai lexeis (Ἀττικαὶ λέξεις)
- Argolika (Ἀργολικά)
- Eliaka (Ἠλιακά)
- The colonies of the Egyptians (Αἰγυπτίων ἀποικίαι)
- On the city of Ptolemais (Περὶ Πτολεμαΐδος)
- Collection of Cretan feasts (Συναγωγὴ τῶν Κρητικῶν θυσιῶν)
- On the struggles of Helios (Περὶ τῶν Ἡλίου ἀγώνων)
- The manifestations of Apollo (Ἀπόλλωνος ἐπιφάνειαι)
- The manifestations of Hercules (Ἡρακλέους ἐπιφάνειαι)
- On the lyric poets (Περὶ μελοποιῶν)
- Symmikta (Σύμμικτα), "Miscellany"
- Hypomnemata (Ὑπομνήματα), "Commentary"
- Replies to Timeus (Πρὸς Τίμαιον ἀντιγραφαί)

== Other resources ==
- demo.fragmentarytexts.org - Istros
- The Digital Fragmenta Historicorum Graecorum (DFHG)
- The Digital Athenaeus
