= Thelxinoë =

Greek mythological figures

In Greek mythology, Thelxinoë (/θɛlkˈsɪnoʊ.iː/; Ancient Greek: Θελξινόη, romanized: Thelxinóē, lit. 'mind-charming') was a name attributed to the following four characters:

- Thelxinoë, one of the sirens. Also known as Thelxiopê (Θελξιόπη) or Thelxiepia/ Thelxiepeia (Θελξιέπεια).
- Thelxinoë, one of the four later recognized Muses in Greek tradition. She and her sisters Aoede, Arche and Melete were regarded as daughters of Zeus by Plusia. She was linked with the charming of the mind as a Muse. The moon of Jupiter Thelxinoe is named after her.
- Thelxinoë, one of Semele's attendants.
- Thelxinoëa, also Thelxionoea or Thelxineia, one of the so-called Praxidicae (the other two were Alacomenia and Aulis), daughters of King Ogyges of Boeotia.
