= Çaltılar =

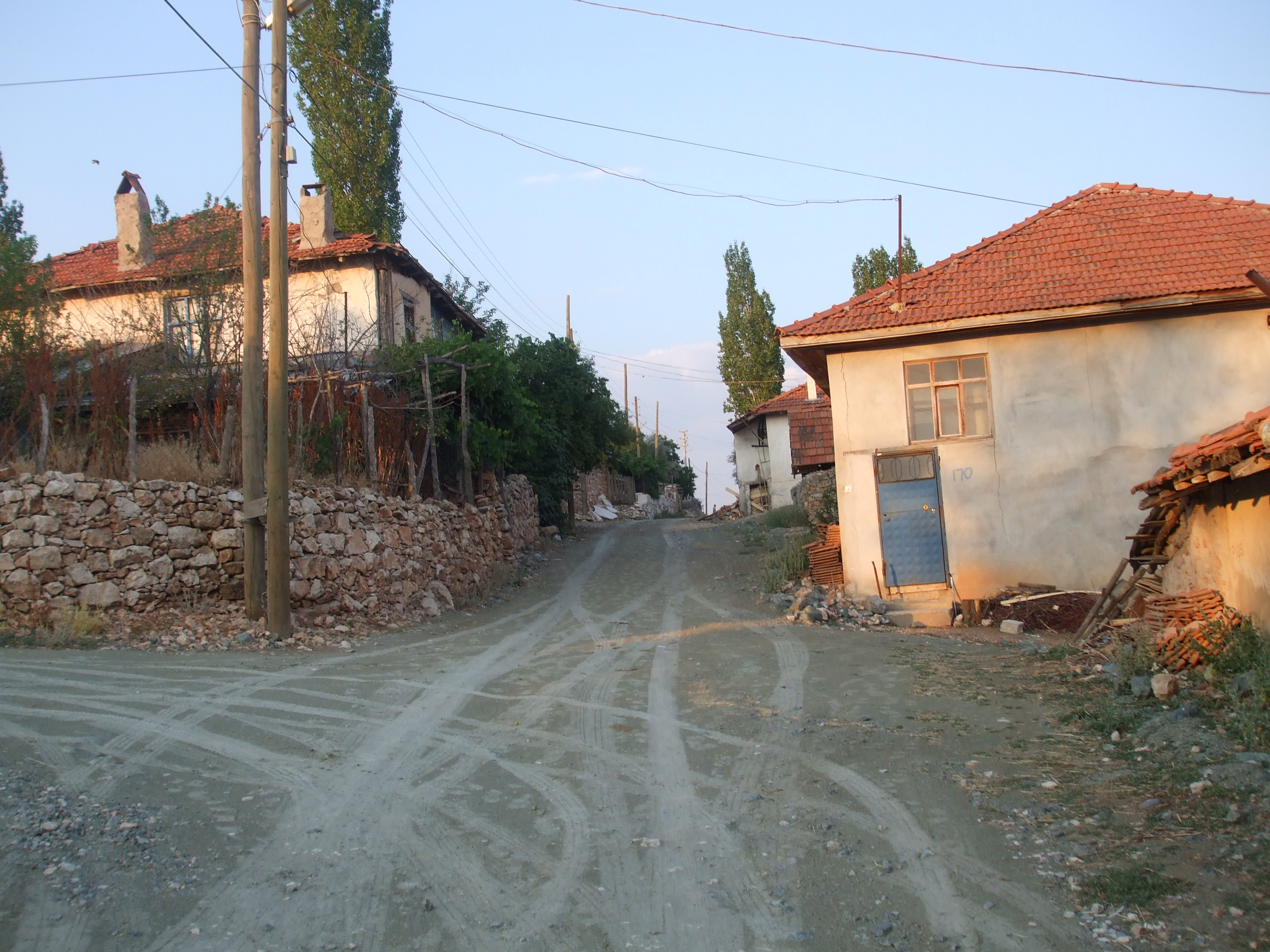
A photograph taken in Çaltılar in 2009

Çaltılar is a rural hamlet in the Seydikemer District of Muğla Province, Turkey (Anatolia), just off State road D.350. It is in the highland summer pastures on the Eşen river system and is the site of a prehistoric settlement known as Çaltılar Höyük.

== Çaltılar Höyük ==
Settlement at Çaltılar höyük goes back to the Chalcolithic, with layers of occupation extending until the early Iron Age. The earliest survey of the site was carried out in 1988 by the Balboura Survey directed by J. J. Coulton. Systematic excavations were carried out by an international team led by Nicoletta Momigliano in 2008–2010. Further excavations launched in 2021 under Professor Ayşegül Aykurt of Hacettepe University found material indicating Bronze Age trade links down river, along the coast and across the Aegean Sea.
