= Arsada =

Ancient Lycian city

Coordinates: 36°29′29″N 29°25′44″E

Arsada or Arsadus was a city of ancient Lycia, located over the valley of the Xanthus between the ancient cities of Tlos and Xanthus.

Its site is located near Arsaköy a neighborhood of the municipality and district of Seydikemer, Muğla Province, Turkey.

The site was visited by Thomas Abel Brimage Spratt in the 19th century, where he found rock tombs, on two of which were inscriptions. "There are several Greek inscriptions; in two of them mention is made of the name of the place." One inscription is given in Spratt's Lycia, from which it appears that the ancient name was not Arsa, as it is assumed in the work referred to, but Arsadus, or Arsada (like Arycanda), as the ethnic name, which occurs twice in the inscription, shows (Ἀρσαδέων ὁ δῆμος, and Ἀρσαδέα, in the accusative singular.) The inscription is on a sarcophagus, and records that the Demus honoured a certain person with a gold crown and a bronze statue for certain services to the community. The inscription shows that there was a temple of Apollo at this place.
