= Eşen River =

River in Turkey

Eşen Seki Çayı
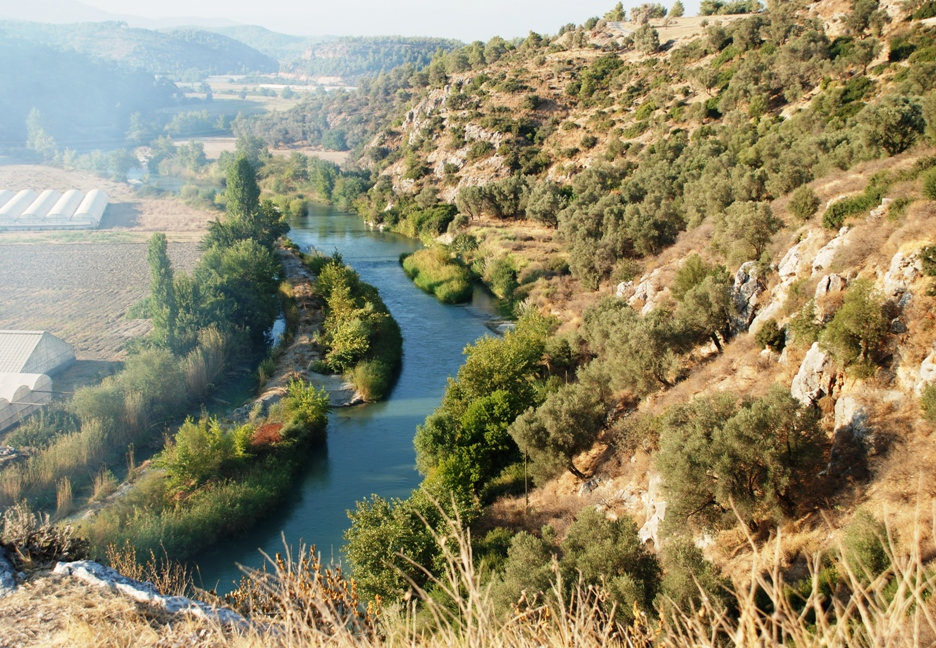
- Eşen River
- Native name: Xanthos (Lycian)

Location
- Country: Turkey
- Provinces: Antalya, Burdur, Muğla
- Districts (ilçe): Korkuteli, Seydikemer, Altınyayla, Fethiye, Kaş

Physical characteristics
- Source: At the west side of Kızılca Dağ, Taurus Mountains
  - elevation: 2000 m
- Mouth: Mediterranean Sea
  - location: Border between Muğla Province and Antalya Province
  - coordinates: 36°17′37″N 29°15′45″E
  - elevation: 0 m
- Length: 120 km (75 mi)

Basin features
- Tributaries
  - left: Karaçay
  - right: Akçay

Eşen River (Turkish: Eşen çeyı or Seki Çayı) is a river in south west Turkey. 120 kilometres (75 mi) - river flows mostly in Muğla Province. It flows in the middle of Seydikemer ilçe (district) of Muğla Province. The river although quite short is known for its touristic importance.

In the antiquity the river as well as the ancient city by the river was known as Xanthos. Both Patara and Letoon are nearby. Currently visitors enjoy rafting in the lower course of the river which draws the border line between Muğla and Antalya Provinces.

== Gallery ==
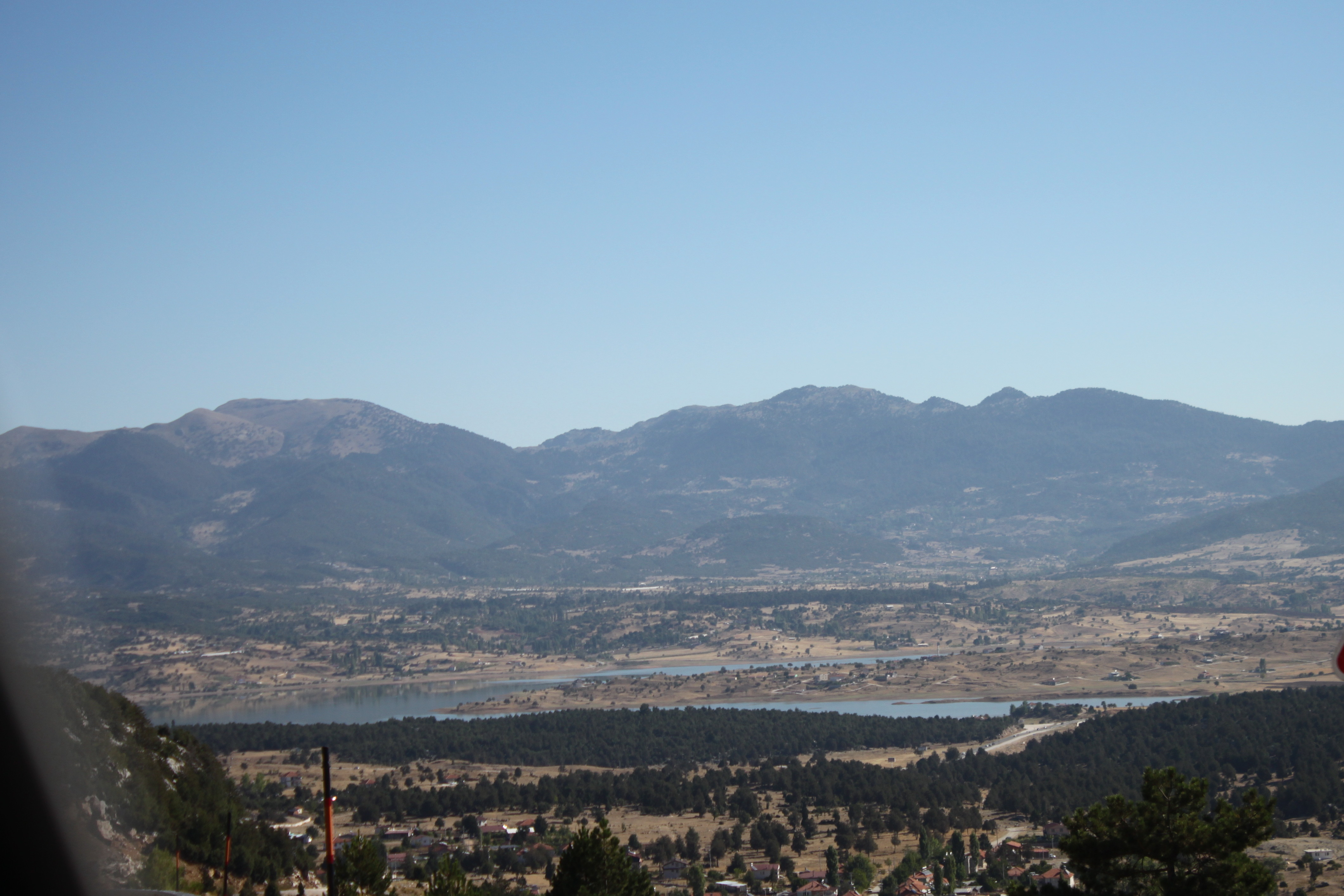
View to the north of the Eşen Dam near Yaylapatlangıç; Seydikemer District, Muğla Province, Turkey.

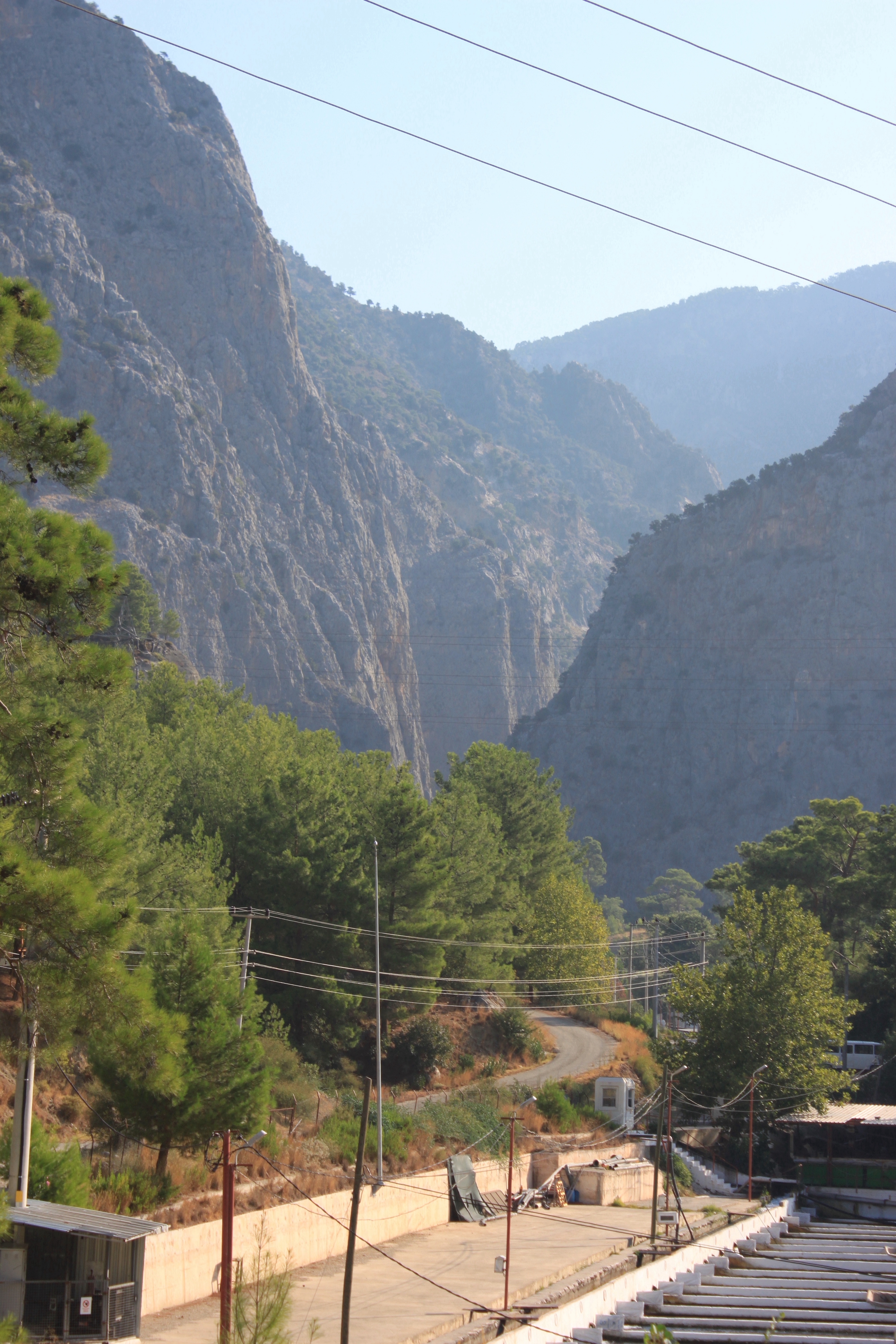
Ören Canyon near Ören, Seydikemer County, Muğla Province; looking north.

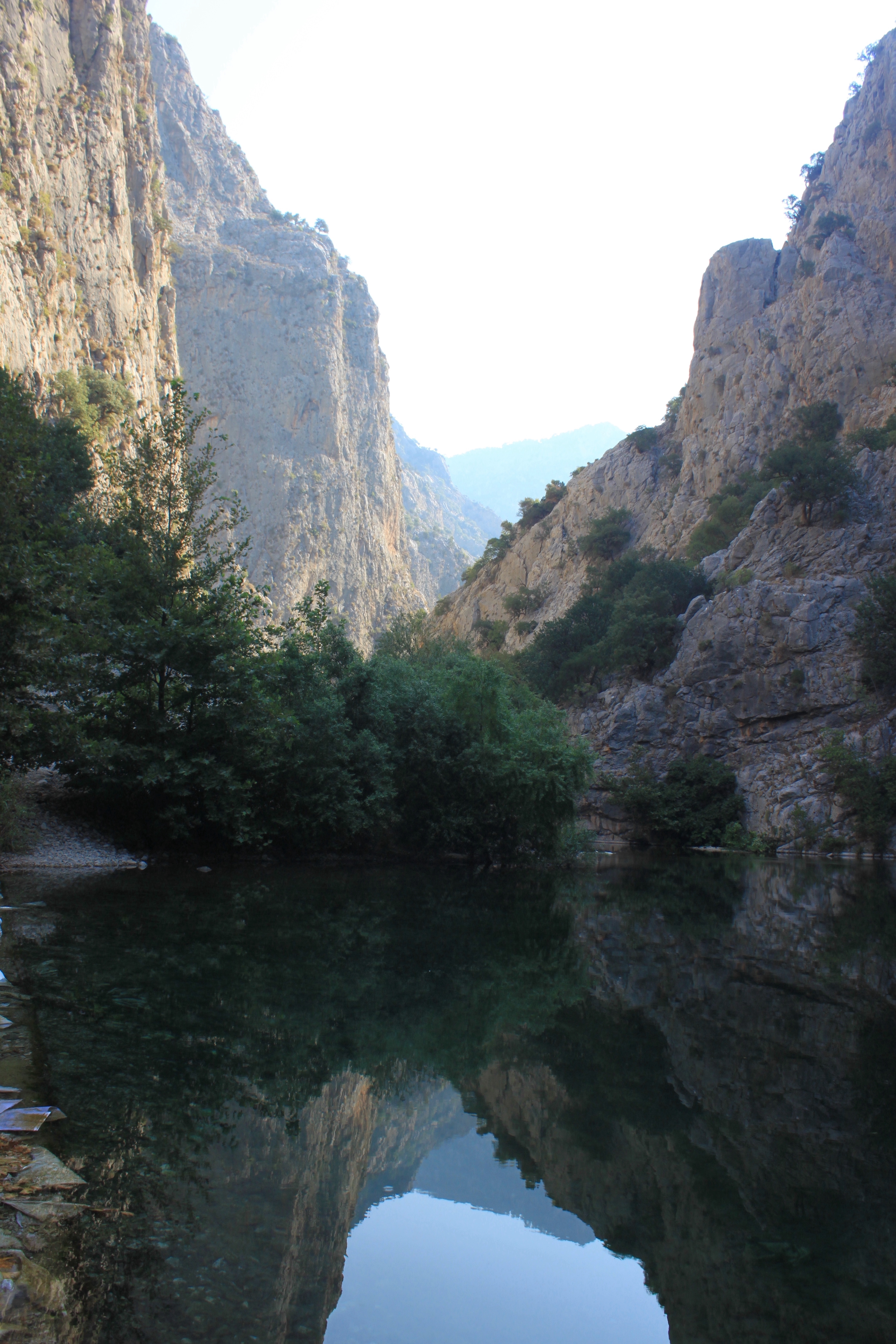
View of the Eşen Çayı (Xanthos) in the Ören Canyon; Seydikemer County, Muğla Province; towards the northeast.
