= Araxa =

City of ancient Lycia

Coordinates: 36°44′44″N 29°22′10″E

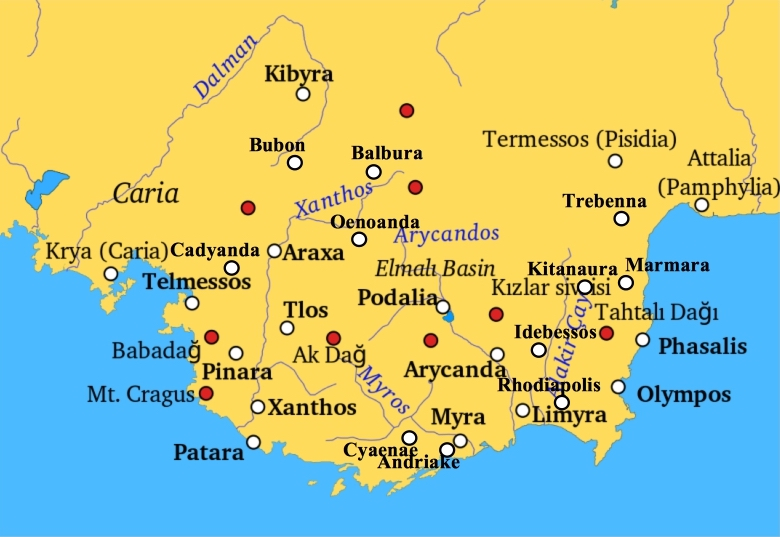
Cities of ancient Lycia

Araxa (Ancient Greek: Ἄραξα) was a city of ancient Lycia, according to Alexander Polyhistor, in the second book of his Lyciaca. Ptolemy places it near Sidyma. It is located at a place called Ören, near Fethiye, on the upper portion of the Xanthus River.

An inscription in honour of a local citizen, Orthagoras, provides the only details of its history in the 2nd century B.C.

== Bishopric ==
Since it was in the Roman province of Lycia, the bishopric of Araxa was a suffragan of the metropolitan see of Myra, the province's capital. The names of four of its bishops are preserved in extant records. Theotimus was at the First Council of Constantinople in 381, Leontius at the Council of Chalcedon in 451, Theodorus at the Trullan Council in 692, and Stephanus at the Second Council of Nicaea in 787.

No longer a residential bishopric, Araxa is today listed by the Catholic Church as a titular see.
