= Momigliano =

Momigliano is a surname of Italian origin. Notable people with this surname include:

- Arnaldo Dante Momigliano, KBE (1908–1987), Italian historian;
- Nicoletta Momigliano, FSA, Italian archaeologist specialising in Minoan Crete and its modern reception.
