= Henri Metzger =

French archaeologist and Hellenist

- Born: 1 August 1912; La Tronche
- Died: 2 November 2007 (aged 95); Vaison-la-Romaine
- Occupation: Archaeologist

Henri Metzger (French pronunciation: [ɑ̃ʁi mɛtz.ʒe]; 19 August 1912 – 2 October 2007) was a French archaeologist and Hellenist, a member of the Institut de France. He specialized in pottery of ancient Greece, particularly from Athens, and archaeology in Anatolia, specifically in Lycia.

== Biography ==
Henri Metzger comes from a family of Alsatian and Protestant origin. After studying at the École Normale Supérieure and passing an agrégation de lettres classiques, he became a member of the French School at Athens (1938–1939 interrupted by a military assignment in Syria (1940–1945) then at the French Institute of Archaeology in Istanbul (1945-1947).

A Doctor in 1950, he completed most of his career at the University of Lyon (Chair of History of ancient art) (from 1947) and as an associate professor of classical archaeology at the University of Geneva (1961–1968).

He was director of the French archaeological mission at Xanthos and Letoon, in Lycia (Turkey), from 1962 to 1978.

He headed the French Institute of Archaeology in Istanbul from 1975 to 1980 and was elected a member of the Académie des Inscriptions et Belles-Lettres in 1989 at the seat of Paul Imbs.

== Some works ==
- 1951: Les représentations dans la céramique attique du Ie, doctorate thesis
- 1952: Catalogue des monuments votifs du musée d'Adalia, complementary thesis
- 1964: La céramique grecque, PUF, coll. « Que sais-je ? », n°588, 112 p.
- 1965: Recherche sur l'imagerie athénienne
- 1972: Céramiques archaïques et classiques de l'acropole lycienne
