= Karadere, Seydikemer =

Karadere
- Neighbourhood
- Location in Turkey Karadere (Turkey Aegean)
- Coordinates: 36°20′N 29°16′E
- Country: Turkey
- Province: Muğla
- District: Seydikemer
- Elevation: 5 m (16 ft)
- Population (2022): 3,125
- Time zone: UTC+3 (TRT)
- Postal code: 48850
- Area code: 0252

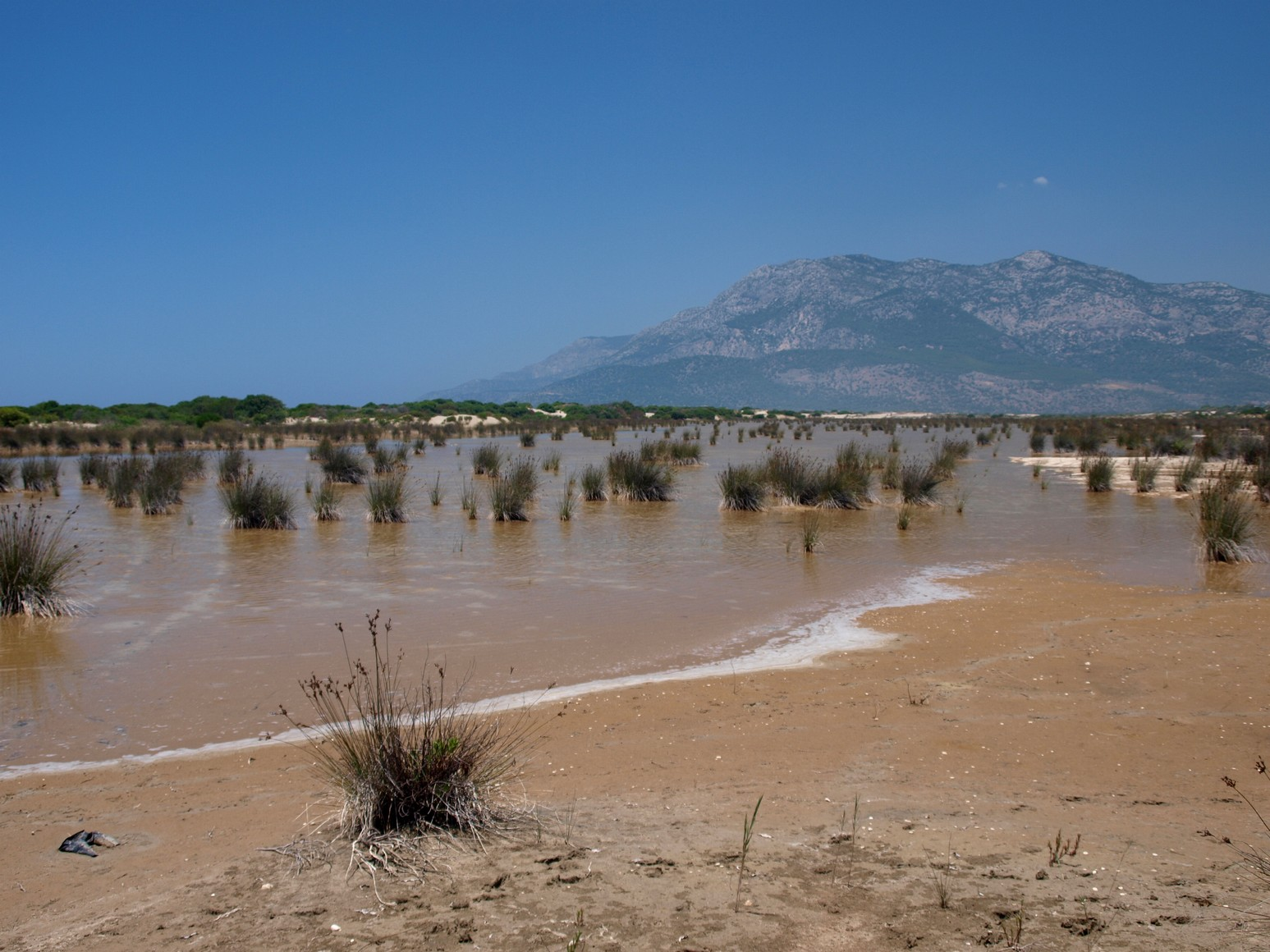
Coast of Karadere

Karadere is a neighbourhood of the municipality and district of Seydikemer, Muğla Province, Turkey. Its population is 3,125 (2022). Before the 2013 reorganisation, it was a town (belde). The town is situated a few kilometers inland from the coast of Mediterranean Sea. The distance to Fethiye is 55 kilometres (34 mi).

Karadere was a part of Lycian Kingdom and the ruins of the historical city of Xanthos is 6 kilometres (3.7 mi) east of Karadere. In 1998 Karadere was declared a seat of township. Previously part of the district of Fethiye, it was included in the newly established Seydikemer district in 2013.

Patara beaches are situated to the southeast of Karadere.
