= Ören, Seydikemer =

Ören
- Neighbourhood
- Location in Turkey Ören (Turkey Aegean)
- Coordinates: 36.7489°N 29.3847°E
- Country: Turkey
- Province: Muğla
- District: Seydikemer
- Population (2022): 1,641
- Time zone: UTC+3 (TRT)

Ören is a neighbourhood of the municipality and district of Seydikemer, Muğla Province, Turkey. Its population is 1,641 (2022). It is the site of the ancient city of Araxa.
