= Panhellenic Games =

Four distinct Ancient Greek sports festivals

Panhellenic Games is the collective term for four separate religious festivals held in Ancient Greece that became especially well known for the athletic competitions they included. The four festivals were: the Olympic Games, which were held at Olympia in honor of Zeus; the Pythian Games, which took place in Delphi and honored Apollo; the Nemean Games, occurring at Nemea and also honoring Zeus; and, finally, the Isthmian Games set in Isthmia and held in honor of Poseidon. The places at which these games were held were considered to be "the four great panhellenic sanctuaries." Each of these Games took place in turn every four years, starting with the Olympics. Along with the fame and notoriety of winning the ancient Games, the athletes earned different crowns of leaves from the different Games. From the Olympics, the victor won an olive wreath, from the Pythian Games a laurel wreath, from the Nemean Games a crown of wild celery leaves, and from the Isthmian Games a crown of pine.

== Description ==
Locations of the four Panhellenic Games in southern Greece.

The Olympiad, the four-year cycle starting with the Olympic Games, was one of the ways the Ancient Greeks measured time. The Games took place over a four-year cycle that began with the Olympic Games in the first year. The Nemean Games were held in year two, the Pythian Games in year three, and the Isthmian Games in year four. They were structured this way so that individual athletes could participate in all of the Games. The dial on the Antikythera mechanism, a mysterious artefact from ancient Greece that appears to have had calendar functions among other uses, was organized to track the Olympiad and suggests that four Games occurred on different years.

Participants could come from all over the Greek world, including the various Greek colonies from Asia Minor to Iberia. Substantial wealth was required to pay for training, transportation, lodging, and other expenses. However, competitors often were funded by their hometowns or private patrons, and many of them traveled together from one competition to another, winning cash awards as they went.

The main events at each of the Games were chariot racing, wrestling, boxing, pankration, stadion and various other foot races, and the pentathlon (made up of wrestling, stadion, long jump, javelin throw, and discus throw). Except for the chariot race, all the events were performed nude. Since the Olympic Games was the original and the pinnacle of all the games in the circuit, each festival might have had its own events but had to include all the events that took place at the Olympics, according to Young. This gave the athletes the opportunity to compete in the same core events at all the Games in the Panhellenic circuit.

The Games were hugely popular not only for their three-day sporting competitions but also because they brought many spectators from all over, according to classics historian Jason König. This allowed for people to partake in other activities like religious events, speeches, and even musical performances.

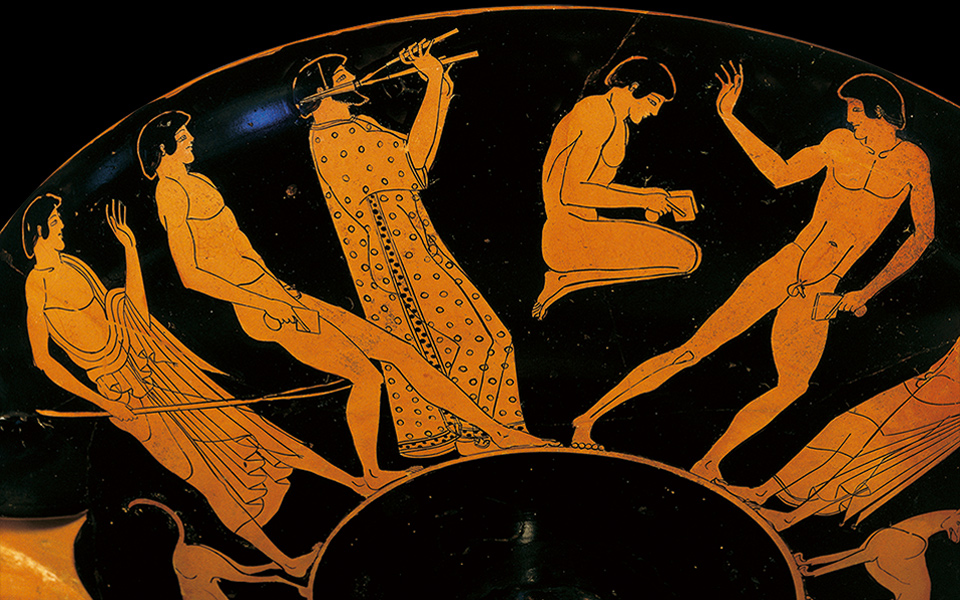
Ancient Greek long jump. Athlete preparing to jump, with one mid-jump.

The Olympic Games were the oldest of the four, said to have begun in 776 BC. It is more likely though that they were founded sometime in the late 7th century BC. They lasted until the Roman Emperor Theodosius, a Christian, abolished them as heathen in AD 393. The Pythian, Nemean, and Isthmian Games most likely began sometime in the first or second quarter of the 6th century BC.

The Olympic Games are described as stephanitic (derived from stephanos, the Attic Greek word for crown), because winners received a garland for victory. No other prizes were awarded, unlike at certain other ancient Greek athletic or artistic contests, such as the Panathenaic Games, at which winners were awarded amphorae of first-class Athenian olive-oil. Though victors received no material awards at the Games, they were often showered with gifts and honours on returning to their polis.

== The Four Games ==
=== Olympic Games ===
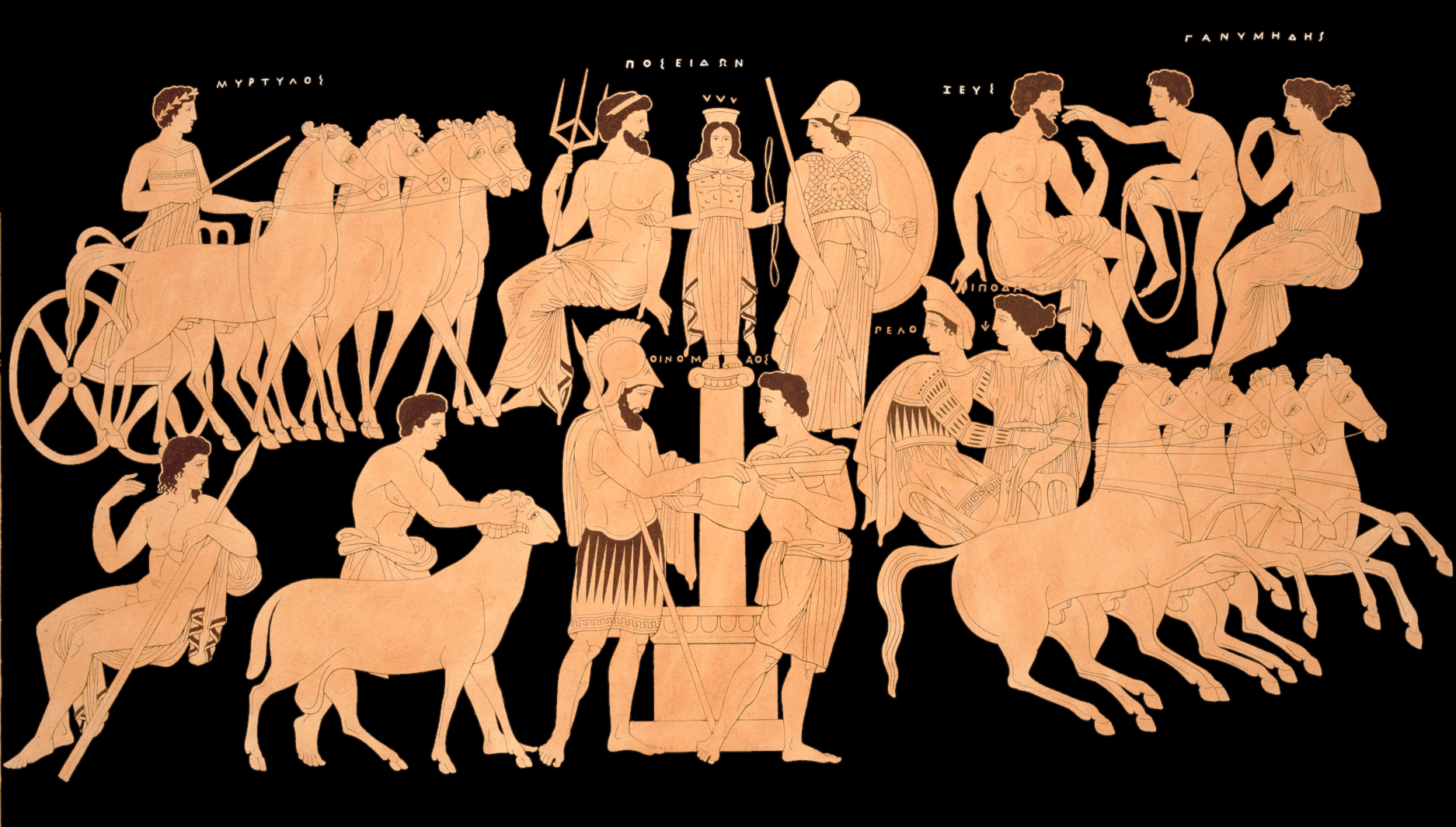
King Oenomaus, Hippodamia, and Olympian gods. Possibly refers to the establishment of the Olympic Games in honour of Oinomaos;

According to Pindar's Olympian 1, the origin of the Ancient Olympic Games can be traced to Pelops, son of Tantalus. Pelops seeks to win the hand of Hippodameia in marriage. King Oenomaus, Hippodameia's father, knows of a prophecy that declares his death to be at the hands of his son in law. King Oenomaus decides the only way for him to marry his daughter is to take part in a chariot race that has killed many other suitors. Pelops asks a favor of Poseidon to bestow upon him a chariot fast enough to bring him victory. Poseidon granted him a golden chariot and winged horses. With this chariot, Pelops won the race and was able to marry Hippodameia. It is also claimed that Pelops had Myrtilus sabotage King Oenomaus’ chariot which caused him to lose the race and die during the process. After his victory, Pelops organized a festival to take place at Olympia with chariot races and other Games in tribute to the gods and to honor King Oenomaus.

The Olympic Games took place every four years at the site of Olympia in Greece. It is thought that first recorded Games were in 776 BC but it is possible that they could have been around for many years before this according to scholar David C. Young. The Olympics were the first established Games for approximately 200 years before the remaining Panhellenic Games came into creation. Since the Games take place in Olympia, the festival held and sacrifices/offerings are in honor of Zeus, the winner of the Games receives an olive wreath. This comes from the myth (as told by Pausanias) that Heracles of Ida started the Olympic Games and planted an olive tree that became sacred to the Greeks and from which the Olympic victors' wreaths were cut.

In Pindar's version of the Olympics, the chariot race was the first of the events at creation. In Pausanias' versions, the foot race is the only event until the fourteenth Olympic Festival. Then another race is added that is longer than the original race. Since the Olympic Games was the original and the pinnacle of all the games in the Circuit, each Festival may have its own events but it must include all the events that took place at the Olympics, according to Young. This gives the athletes the opportunity to compete in the event at all the Games in the Panhellenic circuit.

==== Origin Myths ====
Another origin story from Pausanias was that the Idaean Heracles challenged his younger brothers to a foot race. The winner of the race would receive an olive branch as a reward since they were in such high supply. Pausanias attributes another origin myth to Zeus. It is thought he started the Olympic Games in honor of his victory defeating his father, Cronus.

=== Pythian Games ===
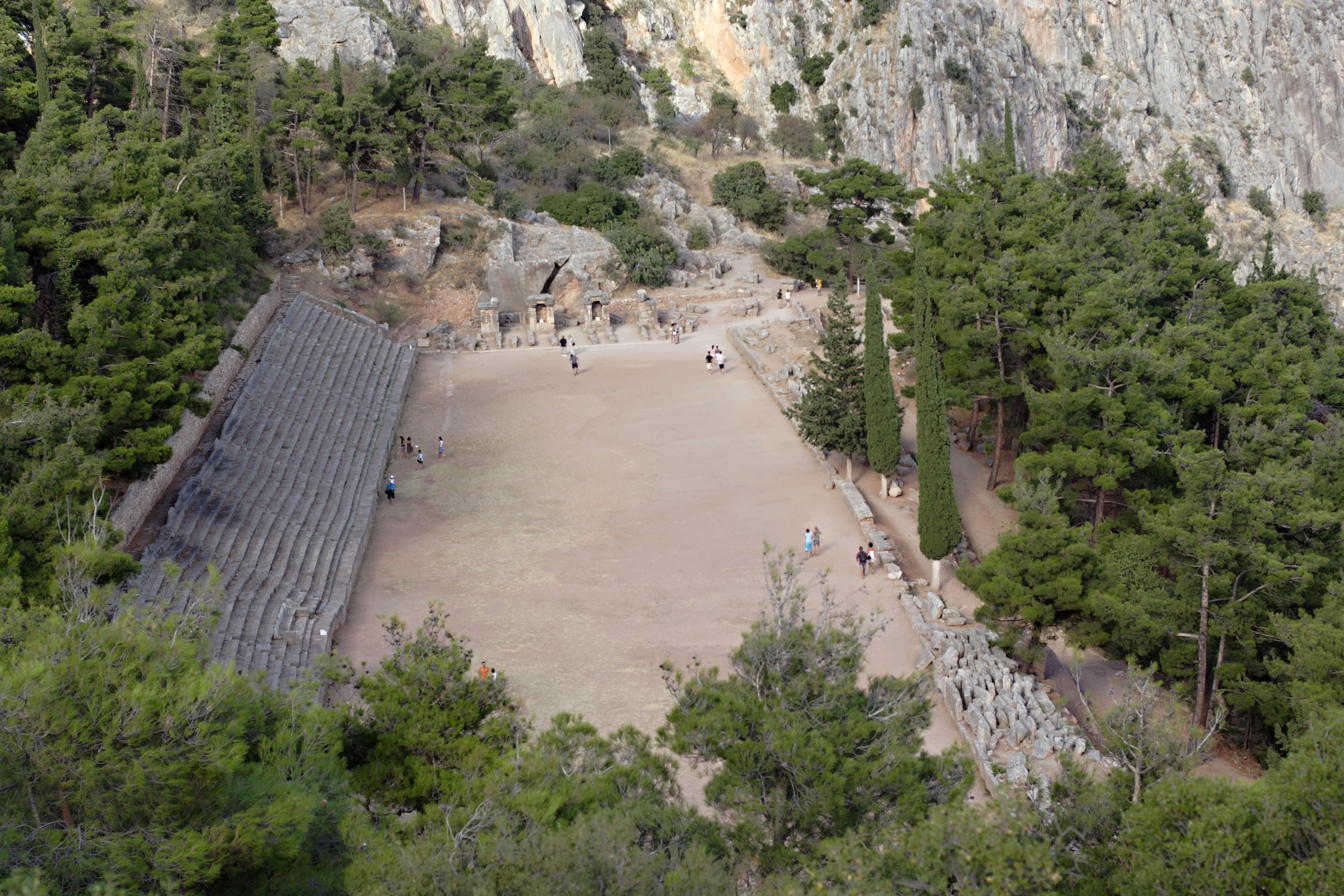
Stadium of the Pythian Games at Delphi

The Pythian Games were established in 582 BC in Delphi to honor the god Apollo. Originally, these games occurred every eight years and there was just one contest—the singing of a hymn to Apollo, accompanied on the cithara. The Pythian Games were the second most important of the Panhellenic Games and took place in late August of the third year of every Olympiad. However, there is some debate about the start of the Pythian Festival amongst historians. Some historians believe Pausanias who dates the first Pythian festival to 586 BC. This argument is because there are few references to the date in Pindar's poems whereas Pausanias more clearly articulates numbered festivals. These Games include a mix of athletic events that took place at the previous Olympic Games, and musical events. The prize to the winner of the Pythian Games is a laurel wreath (also known as bay laurel, Laurus nobilis).

In Pausanias' Description of Greece, he lists Cleisthenes of Sicyon as the winner of the first Pythian Games chariot race. Cleisthenes is also credited with the creation of the Pythian Games. He sought after a suitor for to wed his daughter, Agariste. He organized a competition for those who thought of themselves as worthy to compete in athletic competitions. These competitions evolved into the Pythian Festival.

=== Nemean Games ===
The Nemean Games were established at the sanctuary of Zeus in Nemea in 573 BC. These Games are held every other year, every second and fourth year, in the same years that the Isthmian Games are held, though at different times during the years. The Nemean Games were held in July, whereas the Isthmian were held in April or May.

The Nemean Games have two origination stories. Pausanias tells of the most recognized myth that the Games were originally funeral Games to honor the death of baby Opheltes, the infant son of Lykourgos and Eurydike. Lykourgos was told of a prophecy that his son could not touch the ground until he walked. Lykourgos appointed a slave to take care of his son and prevent him from being set down. One day the Seven Against Thebes came across the slave and baby Opheltes and asked for a drink. The slave set the babe on the ground amongst wild celery to assist the Seven. Opheltes was attacked by a snake and killed, thus fulfilling the prophecy. The Nemean Games were held in his honor with the prize to the victor being a wreath of wild celery.

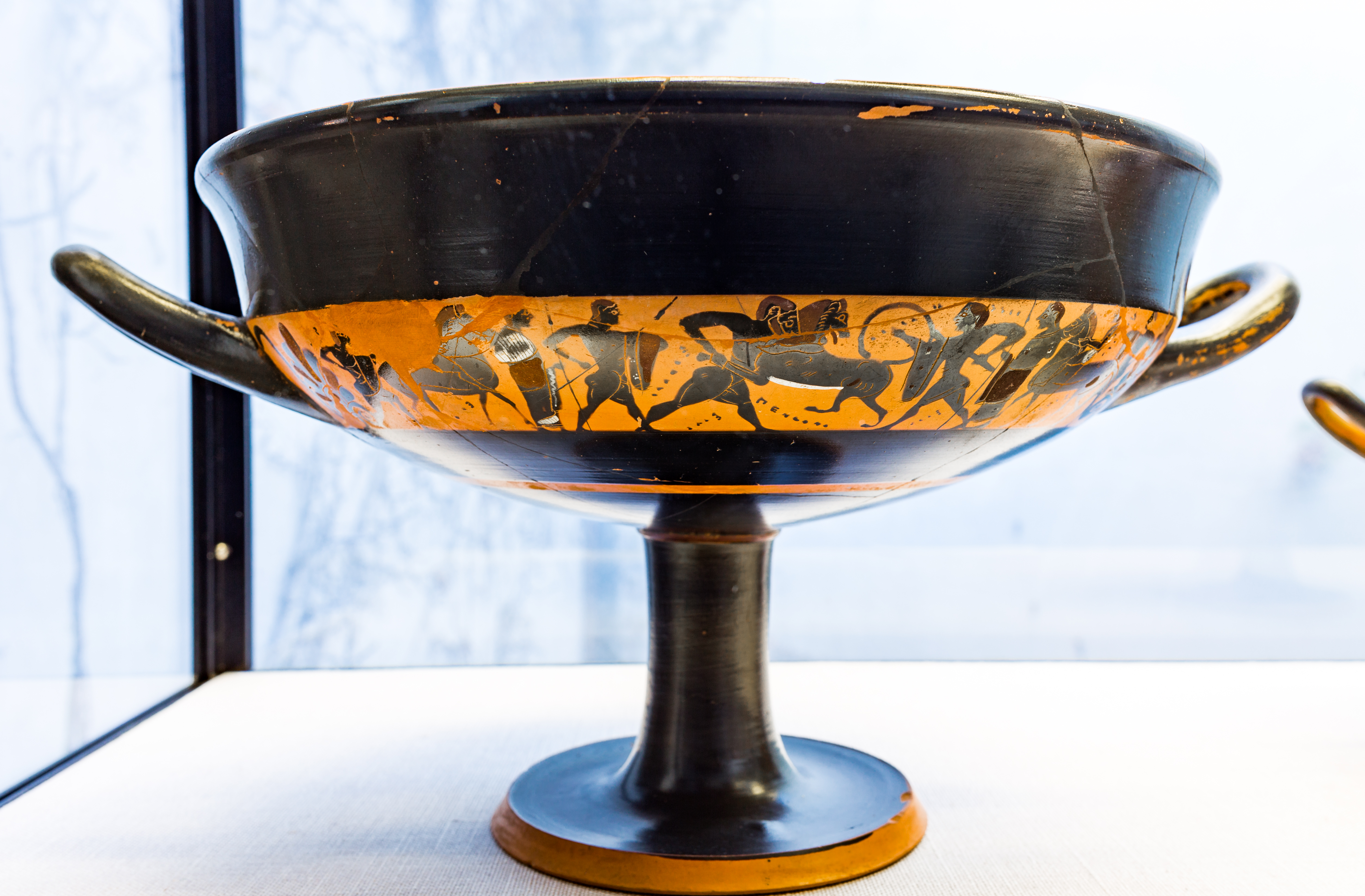
Herakles wrestling the Nemean lion vase

The second origination is that of Heracles first of ten labors by King Eurystheus. He was tasked with bringing back the skin of the lion that stalked the hills of Nemea. Heracles came to a village, Cleonae where he met Molorchus. Molorchus agreed to make a sacrifice to Heracles if he did not return after 30 days, and Zeus if he did. Heracles found the lion and followed him to his cave. He blocked on entrances then went in after the lion and attacked. Heracles returned to Molorchus' home on the 30th day and they made a sacrifice to Zeus. The Games are said to be in honor of both Zeus and Heracles each year.

=== Isthmian Games ===
The Isthmian Games started near Corinth in 582 B.C., the same year as the Pythian Games began in Delphi. They are held every second and fourth year, just like the Nemean Games, but in the spring (April or May). The winner of the Isthmian Games originally received a pine crown, but in the Classical era dry celery was substituted.

Pausanias attributes the origin of the Games to King Sisyphus of Corinth. Sisyphus held the Games at a funeral in honor of Melikertes (later changed to Palaimon), a boy who drowned in the gulf. According to Pausanias, Palaimon was killed because Hera found out his parents were raising baby Dionysus which brought down her wrath.

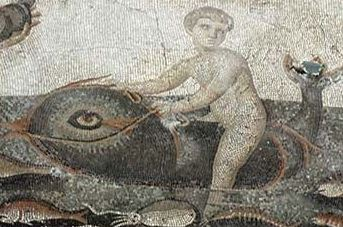
Palaimon shown riding a dolphin after his mother jumps into the sea while holding him to save him from Hera

Plutarch and Apollodorus credit the origin of the Isthmian Games with Theseus. Theseus was travelling to Athens when he heard of Sinis. Sinis was a conqueror and a thief. He would kill his victims by tying them to the top of fir trees that he pulled down, then letting them spring back which caused the victim to launched into the air and fall back down to the ground. Theseus killed Sinis in the same manner. He then held the funerary Games in honor of the deceased. Plutarch also credits Theseus with holding the Games in honor of Poseidon, since they were typically held in his sanctuary in Corinth.

== Athletes ==
According to archaeologist, H.W. Pleket, in the early days of the Olympic Games, before the formation of local or the remaining "Big Four" festivals, the athletes mostly came from the wealthy class of Greek male athletes. This is because the cost training and traveling would be too great for those of low birth to participate. Pleket and historian David Stone Potter describe a view from Alcibiades saying how he would rather breed horses for racing than take part in the gymnastic events because it was "not to be pursued by one of low estate." However, as the games progressed, less wealthy athletes were able to eventually take part in the Festival by being sponsored by their home towns or wealthy backers. Many of the less wealthy had to work their way up through the local festivals in order to prove themselves.

Young describes how the men were divided into different groups for the Games, however the division differed from one festival to another. These groups consisted of boys, youths and men but sometimes may just be broken into men and boys.

Edward Norman Gardiner makes the point that physical fitness and athletics is incredibly important in the Ancient Greek world because every male is required to take part in the Greek military. Because of the environment of warfare, physical fitness was essential to men's life.

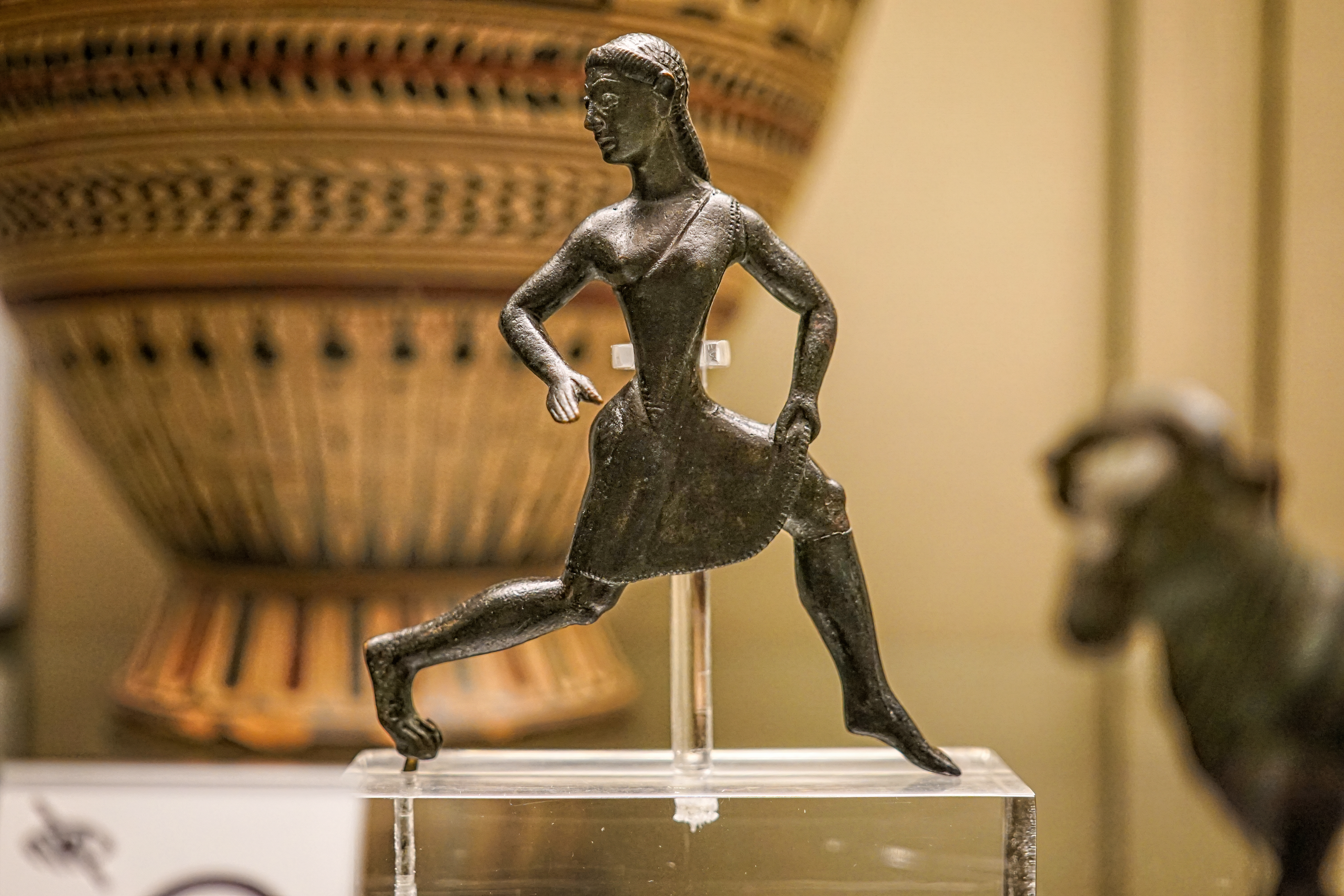
Bronze figure of a running girl. Spartan. The short chiton baring one breast matches the outfit that Pausanias says was worn by athletes competing in the Heraean Games.

While the overwhelming majority of those that participated in the Panhellenic Games were free Greek men, there is evidence that female athletes also participated in the Games, often as chariot horse owners. Historian Georgia Tsouvala gives three examples of inscriptions from lesser polis festivals that provide evidence of female athletes that were members of the gymnasia. Tsouvala also points out that, while it was not common for women to be able to partake in any form of physical education in ancient Greece, there are some states where it was encouraged, such as Sparta. In works by Vergil, Plutarch and Ovid there are references to Spartan women taking part in traditionally male activities like boar hunting, pancration and discus throwing.

Tsouvala points out that other than as chariot horse owners, it was likely that girls and women would take part in footraces in the festivals in honor of Artemis and Iphigenia. Inscriptions were discovered in Naples detailing young women who participated in the stadion and dolichos foot races.

The male athletes that participated in the Panhellenic Games did so in the nude. This was common and not viewed as something shameful or indecent because Ancient Greek attituded toward male nudity differed from those of Western Judeo-Christian society, according to David Young. The word gymnasium comes from gymnos, meaning naked. While there was nothing indecent about the nude form, women were not allowed to be nude because it led to promiscuity. However, Plutarch's Life of Lycurgus describes how Spartan women were encouraged to participate naked in all their activities except for some festivals where singing and dancing with men was permitted.

== See also ==
- Agonothetes
- Ancient Olympic Games
- Hermogenes of Xanthos
- Running in Ancient Greece
- Theorodokoi
- Theoroi
