= AD 90 =

AD 90 in various calendars
- Gregorian calendar: AD 90; XC
- Ab urbe condita: 843
- Assyrian calendar: 4840
- Balinese saka calendar: 11–12
- Bengali calendar: −504 – −503
- Berber calendar: 1040
- Buddhist calendar: 634
- Burmese calendar: −548
- Byzantine calendar: 5598–5599
- Chinese calendar: 己丑年 (Earth Ox); 2787 or 2580 — to — 庚寅年 (Metal Tiger); 2788 or 2581
- Coptic calendar: −194 – −193
- Discordian calendar: 1256
- Ethiopian calendar: 82–83
- Hebrew calendar: 3850–3851
- Hindu calendars
- Vikram Samvat: 146–147
- Shaka Samvat: 11–12
- Kali Yuga: 3190–3191
- Holocene calendar: 10090
- Iranian calendar: 532 BP – 531 BP
- Islamic calendar: 548 BH – 547 BH
- Javanese calendar: N/A
- Julian calendar: AD 90; XC
- Korean calendar: 2423
- Minguo calendar: 1822 before ROC 民前1822年
- Nanakshahi calendar: −1378
- Seleucid era: 401/402 AG
- Thai solar calendar: 632–633
- Tibetan calendar: ས་མོ་གླང་ལོ་ (female Earth-Ox); 216 or −165 or −937 — to — ལྕགས་ཕོ་སྟག་ལོ་ (male Iron-Tiger); 217 or −164 or −936

AD 90 (XC) was a common year starting on Friday of the Julian calendar. At the time, it was known as the Year of the Consulship of Domitian and Nerva (or, less frequently, year 843 Ab urbe condita). The denomination AD 90 for this year has been used since the early medieval period, when the Anno Domini calendar era became the prevalent method in Europe for naming years.

== Events ==
=== By place ===
==== Roman Empire ====
- An epidemic afflicts Rome.

=== By topic ===
==== Art ====
- The Young Flavian Woman is made. It is now kept at Musei Capitolini, Rome (approximate date).

== Births ==
- Ishmael ben Elishha, Jewish rabbi (approximate date)
- Quintus Tuneius Rufus, Roman politician (approximate date)

== Deaths ==
- Gaius Valerius Flaccus, Roman poet (approximate date)
- Pedanius Dioscorides, Greek physician (approximate date)
- Tiberius Julius Rhescuporis I, Roman client king
