= Nicoletta Momigliano =

Nicoletta Momigliano is an archaeologist specialising in Minoan Crete and its modern reception.

== Early life and education ==
Momigliano was born in Milan, Italy, in 1960, where she attended primary and secondary school. She read Classics (Letteratura Classica) at the University of Pisa, where she graduated in 1982. She obtained her MA (1984) from the Institute of Archaeology of the University of London (now part of University College London), and her PhD from University College London (1989), under the supervision of John Nicolas Coldstream. From 1990 to 1993 she was a non-stipendiary Junior Research Fellow at Wolfson College, Oxford and a Research Assistant to Ann Brown, who was responsible for the Sir Arthur Evans Archive and the Aegean collections at the Ashmolean Museum, Oxford. From 1993 to 1996 she was the Richard Bradford McConnell Research Fellow in Aegean Archaeology at Balliol College, Oxford. She is the widow of Roger H. Lonsdale.

== Career ==
From 1996 to 1998, Momigliano was a lecturer in Archaeology at the Department of Archaeological Sciences, University of Bradford. She has been teaching at the University of Bristol since September 1998, where she is Professor of Aegean Studies in the Department of Classics and Ancient History.

In 1991, she received the Michael Ventris Award for Mycenaean Studies, for her research on Duncan Mackenzie. In 2003, she was elected Fellow of the Society of Antiquaries of London. She has directed and co-directed archaeological projects in Crete (Knossos, Palaikastro) and Turkey (Iasos, Çaltılar). Her publications include many articles and books on Aegean prehistory, especially Minoan archaeology. From 2007 to 2010 she was the Editor of the Annual of the British School at Athens. She was the Director of the Institute of Greece, Rome, and the Classical Tradition at the University of Bristol from 2015 to 2017.

== Selected publications ==
- In Search of the Labyrinth: The Cultural Legacy of the Minoans (London: Bloomsbury 2020) (https://www.bloomsbury.com/uk/in-search-of-the-labyrinth-9781350156715/). Longlisted for the Runciman Award for 2021 (https://runcimanaward.org/)
- Cretomania. Desiring the Minoan Past in the Present (Abingdon, Oxon: Routledge 2017, publ. September 2016) Co-edited with A. Farnoux.
- The Excavations of Shemesh, November December 1912 (Abingdon, Oxon: Routledge, 2016 (publ. Dec 2015) (Co-authored with D. Mackenzie†, S. Bunimovitz and Z. Lederman).
- Bronze Age Carian Iasos: Structures and Finds From The Area of The Roman Agora (ca. 3000–1500 BC) (Rome: G. Bretschneider, June 2012). With contributions by P. Belli, M. Bichler, J. Hilditch, C. J. Knappett, D. Pirrie, M. Power, and J. H. Sterba.
- Knossos Pottery Handbook: Neolithic and Bronze Age (Minoan)(London: British School at Athens, BSA Studies vol. 14, 2007). Editor.
- Archaeology and European Modernity: Producing and Consuming the ‘Minoans’ (Padua: Ausilio, Bottega d'Erasmo). Co-edited with Y. Hamilakis.
- Duncan Mackenzie: a Cautious Canny Highlander and the Palace of Minos at Knossos (Bulletin of the Institute of Classical Studies, Suppl. Vol. 72; London: University of London 1999).
- Knossos: A Labyrinth of History. Papers in Honour of Sinclair Hood (Oxford: British School at Athens & Oxbow Books, 1994). Co-edited with H. Hughes-Brock and D. Evely.
