= Seydikemer =

- District and municipality
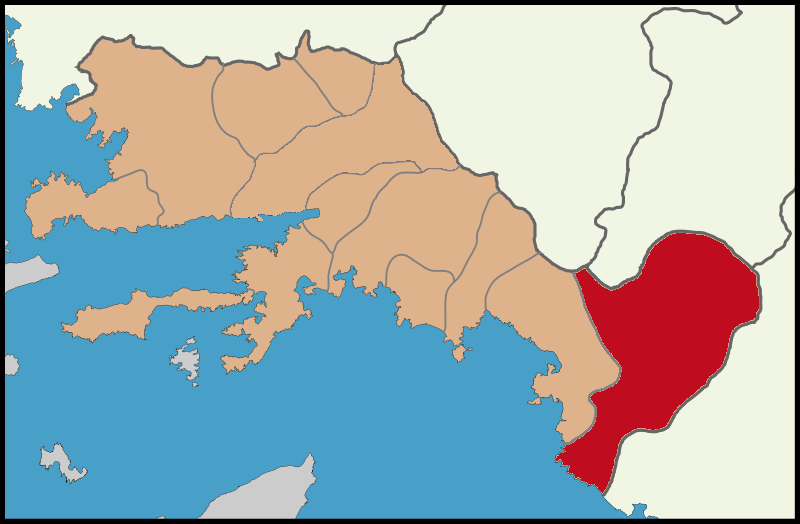
- Map showing Seydikemer District in Muğla Province

- Location in Turkey Seydikemer (Turkey Aegean)
- Coordinates: 36°38′53″N 29°21′42″E
- Country: Turkey
- Province: Muğla
- Area: 2,208 km^{2} (853 sq mi)
- Population (2022): 62,622
  - Density: 28.36/km^{2} (73.46/sq mi)
- Time zone: UTC+3 (TRT)
- Area code: 0252
- Website: www.seydikemer.bel.tr

Seydikemer is a municipality and district of Muğla Province, Turkey. Its area is 2,208 km^{2}, and its population is 62,622 (2022).

The district and municipality Seydikemer was created at the 2013 Turkish local government reorganisation from part of the district of Fethiye, including the former municipality Kemer. The name refers to Kemer and the adjacent village Seydiler.

Located some 30 kilometres (19 mi) inland from Fethiye, this remains very much a traditional Turkish town. There are nevertheless a few expats living here.

== Archaeology ==
In 2025, archaeologists announced the discovery of an ornately carved Roman-era funerary stele after it was found by a goat herder near Kayacik. The limestone stele, estimated at around 300 kilograms, features relief carvings including a central human bust framed by decorative motifs and Greek inscriptions.

== Composition ==
There are 65 neighbourhoods in Seydikemer District:

- Alaçat
- Arifler
- Arsaköy
- Atlıdere
- Bağlıağaç
- Bayırköy
- Bekçiler
- Belen
- Boğalar
- Boğaziçi
- Çaltılar
- Çaltıözü
- Çamurköy
- Çatak
- Çayan
- Çaykenarı
- Ceylan
- Çobanisa
- Çobanlar
- Çökek
- Çukurincir
- Cumhuriyet
- Demirler
- Dereköy
- Dodurga
- Doğanlar
- Dont
- Düğer
- Eşen
- Gerişburnu
- Girmeler
- Gölbent
- Güneşli
- Hacıosmanlar
- İzzetinköy
- Kabaağaç
- Kadıköy
- Karadere
- Karaköy
- Kayabaşı
- Kayacık
- Kayadibi
- Kıncılar
- Kınık
- Korubükü
- Kumluova
- Menekşe
- Minare
- Ören
- Ortaköy
- Paşalı
- Sahil Ceylan
- Sarıyer
- Seki
- Seydiler
- Söğütlüdere
- Temel
- Uğurlu
- Yakabağ
- Yakaköy
- Yayla Eldirek
- Yayla Gökben
- Yayla Karaçulha
- Yaylapatlangıç
- Zorlar

== Attractions ==
Popular places are Saklıkent National Park, Tlos, Letoon, Pinara, Sidyma, Erendag and Oenoanda.
