= Letoon =

Lycian sanctuary settlement on the Mediterranean coast of Turkey

Coordinates: 36°19′55″N 29°17′23″E

- Letoon (Turkish); Λητῷον (Ancient Greek)
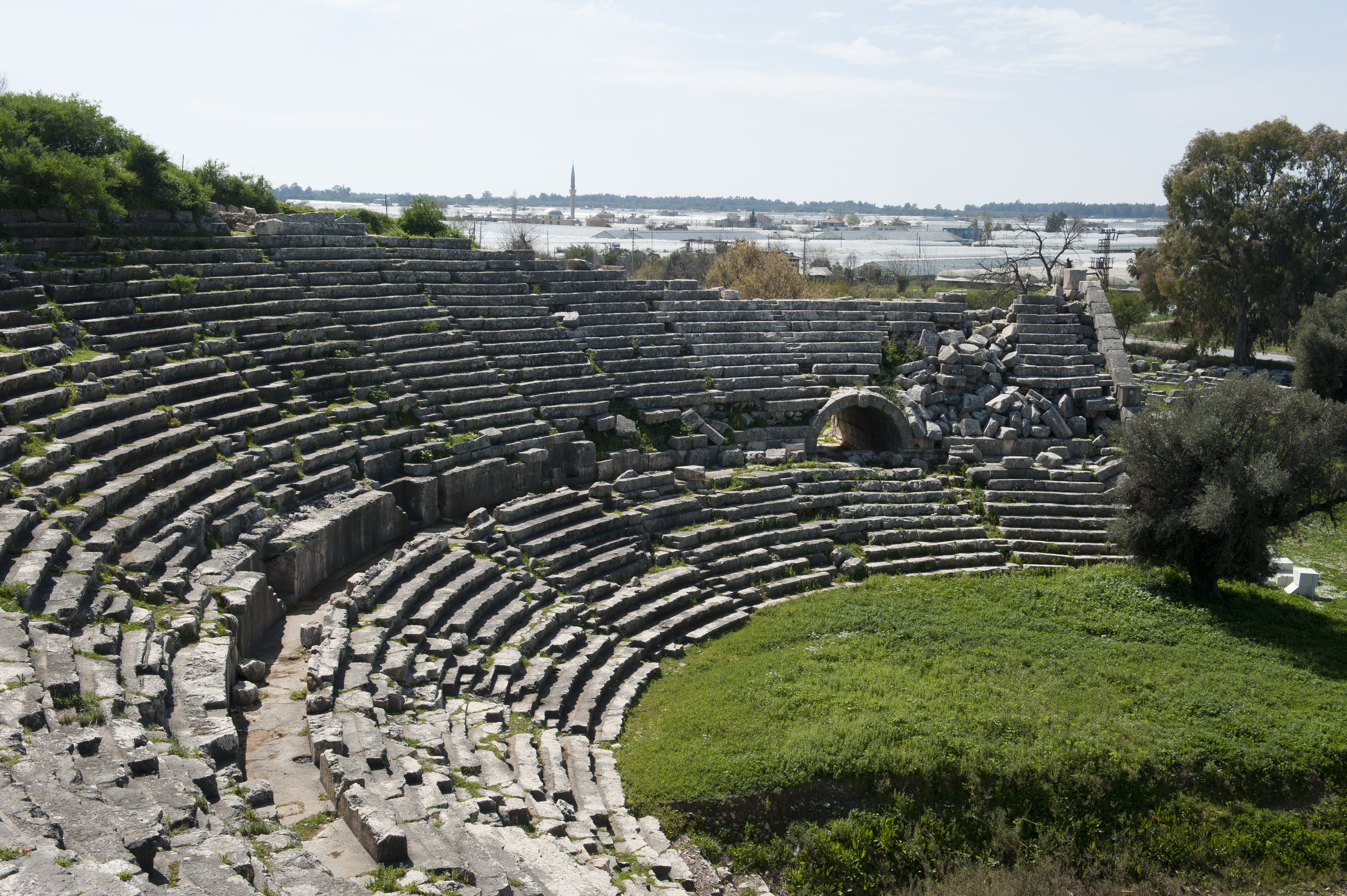
- Hellenistic theatre
- Interactive map of Letoon
- Type: Sanctuary complex
- Location: Kumluova
- Region: Muğla Province, Turkey

History
- Built: Late 6th century BC
- Abandoned: 7th century

Site notes
- Website: turkishmuseums.com

UNESCO World Heritage Site
- Type: Cultural
- Criteria: ii, iii
- Designated: 1988 (12th session)
- Reference no.: 484-003
- Part of: Xanthos-Letoon

Letoon or Letoum (Turkish: Letoon, Ancient Greek: Λητῷον) in the Fethiye district of Muğla Province, Turkey, was a sanctuary of Leto located 4 kilometres (2.5 mi) south of the ancient city of Xanthos, to which it was closely associated, and along the Xanthos River. It was one of the most important religious centres in the region though never a fully-occupied settlement.

Letoon was added as a UNESCO World Heritage Site in 1988.

== History ==
Letoon was the religious centre of Xanthos and the Lycian League. Inscriptions found at the site indicate that it was where Lycian rulers declared their decisions to the public. It was continuously occupied from the 8th century BC to the end of the Roman period of occupation.

The site was dedicated to the worship of the Letoids—the Greek goddess Leto, and her twin offspring, Artemis and Apollo. According to a myth, Leto was drinking at a lake in Lycia whilst fleeing with her children Apollo and Artemis from the anger of the goddess Hera. When local peasants tried to drive her away, she rebuked them and transformed them into frogs. Leto may have been identified with an early Luwian goddess whose cult was located with Letoon. The Letoids were designated as the Lycians' national gods. (Note: A claim for an early Lycian cult of Apollo centred in the plain of the River Xanthus was provided by two Greek myths connected to an eponymous hero, Lycus. One myth originated from the Telchines, the autochthonous inhabitants of Rhodes, who may have colonized the region at the time of Deucalion's flood; The other involved an Athenian brother of Aegeus who introduced the cult of Lycaean Apollo. Folk etymology made Lycus the Athenian colonizer of ancient Lycia.)

The sanctity of the site is the purport of an anecdote related by the 2nd century Greek historian Appian concerning Mithridates VI of Pontus, who was planning to cut down the trees in the sacred grove for his own purposes during his siege of Patara, but was warned against this sacrilege in a nightmare.

The site remained active through the Roman period. It was Christianised by the construction of an basilical church.

== Archaeology ==
Archaeological finds at Letoon date to at least the 6th century BCE, and pre-date the Greek cultural hegemony in Lycia. The sanctuary was connected to Xanthos by a road that led up from Patara to the south.

The foundations of the three Hellenistic temples dedicated to Leto and her children have been excavated since 1962, under the successive direction of the French archaeologists Henri Metzger, Jacques Des Courtils and Emmanuel Laroche. Since then, excavations have uncovered most of the site's ruins, most of which are located under the water table of the River Xanthos.

The temple of Leto was successfully reconstructed in its original setting between 2000 and 2007 using original pieces found during excavations carried out since 1950s. As of 2004, the stadium has not been located.

=== Letoon trilingual ===
In 1973, a stele was discovered at the site. The stele's inscription, dated to 337 BCE, features texts in the Lycian language, Ancient Greek and Aramaic. The so-called Letoon trilingual is now conserved in the Fethiye Museum. It contains regulations for the establishment of a cult at Letoon. The text has contributed greatly to a greater understanding of the Lycian language. The text is unusual in not being an epitaph unlike most Lycian texts.

== Description ==
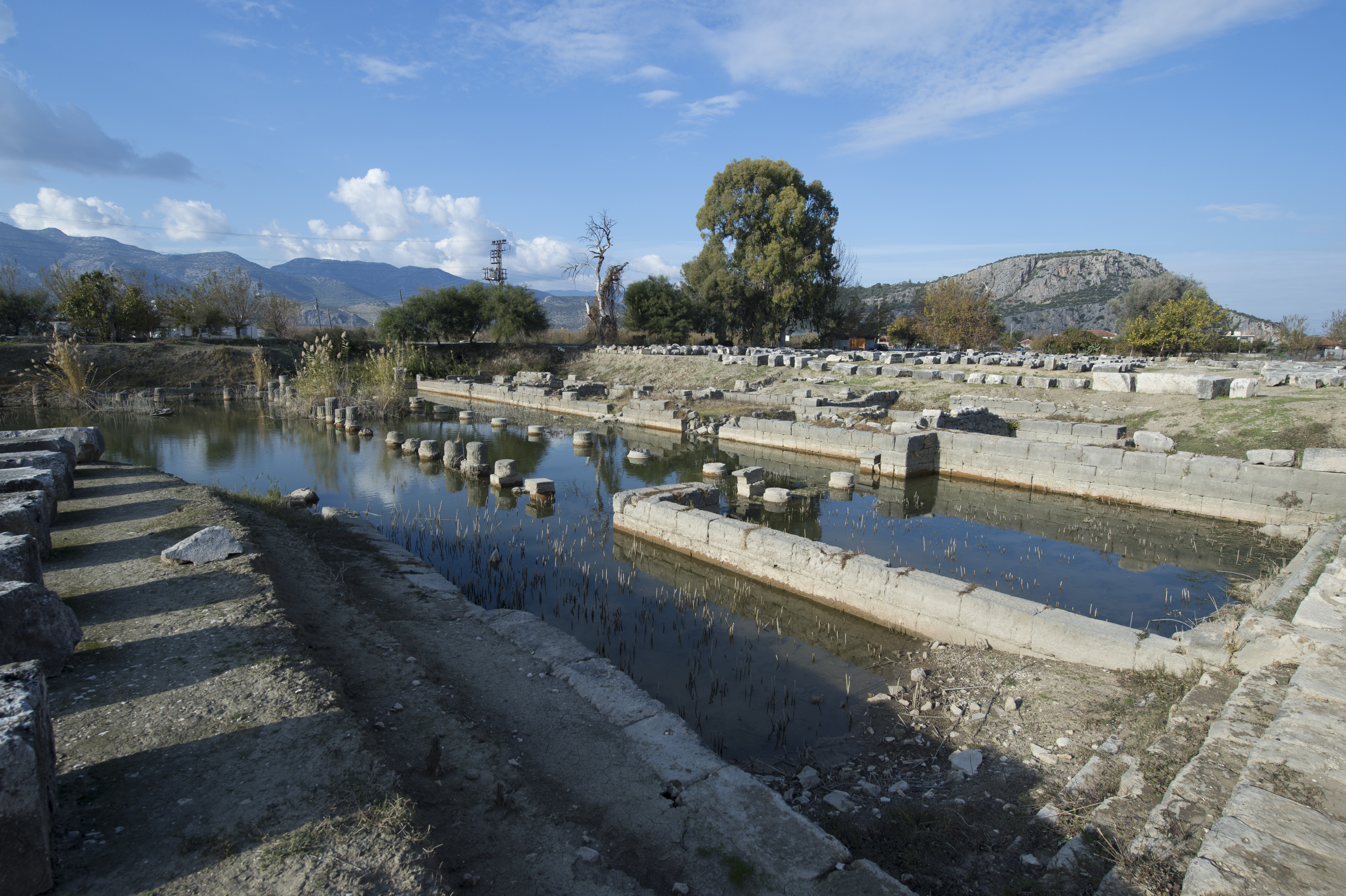
The north portico

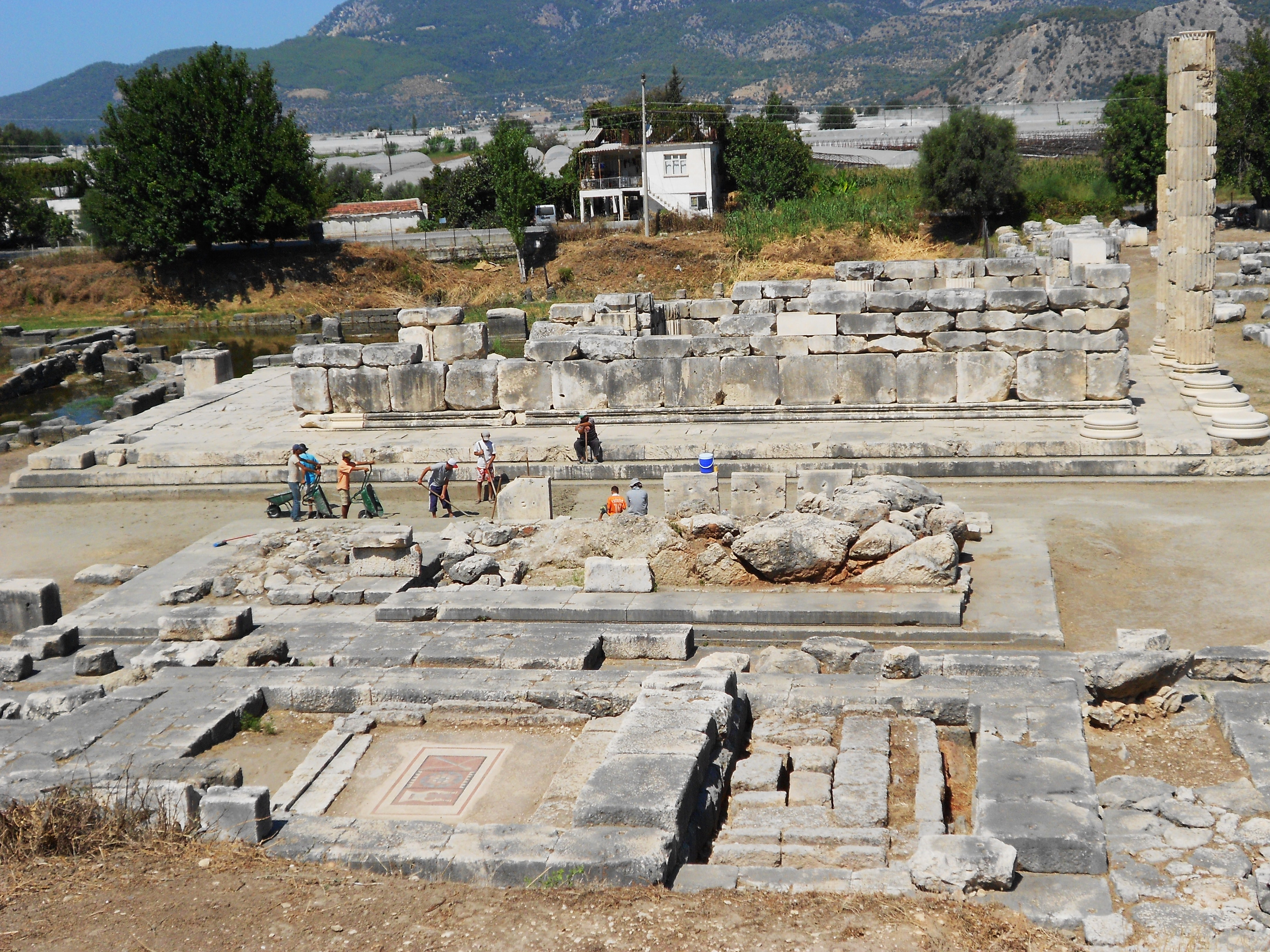
The three temples

Letoon is located south of the village of Kumluova (previously known as Botisullu), in the Fethiye district of Muğla Province, Turkey. The site is 4 kilometres (2.5 mi) southwest of the site of Lycia's most important city, Xanthos. The Greek geographer Strabo located Letoon ten stades—more than one mile (1.6 km)—from the coast, a figure considered by the English archaeologist George Ewart Bean to be correct, considering the probable change in the position of the coast line since Classical antiquity.

The complex is dominated by three 4/5th century BC temples. The central temple was dedicated to Artemis. The other two temples, which are Greek, were dedicated to at least one of the other Letoids.

The nymphaeum (which supplied a source of fresh water), is early 2nd century or later. It occupied the site of a Hellenistic structure built over a spring. Spring water used to emerge from the nymphaeum, flanked by a pair of exedras; of the remains, only those dating from the 3rd century are visible.

The remaining ruins remain largely intact and unaffected by tourism or modern building.

== Historical importance ==
The River Xanthos estuary

Letoon was added as a UNESCO World Heritage Site, along with Xanthos, in 1988. According to UNESCO, the archaeological sites at Xanthos and Letoon represent "the most unique extant architectural example of the ancient Lycian Civilization". UNESCO has acknowledged that the Lycian rock inscriptions are the language's most important texts, and have a crucial role in helping to understand both the ancient Lycian people, their civilization, and their long-lost language.

Letoon is a 1st degree archaeological site and so subject to conservation legislation. It is within an Environment Protection Zone under the responsibility of the Turkish Ministry of Environment and Urbanization. The Regional Conservation Council approved a Conservation Plan in 2006.

The architecture influenced that of other Lycian cities such as Patara, Pınara, and Myra.

Visually affected by greenhouses which surround it, Letton is also threatened by seasonal rising of the water table. The construction of water channels in 2006 acted to mitigate the effect during excavation works. The Turkish government has begun to control the surrounding environment and address issues relating to the preservation of the monuments, such as the management of visitors to the site, and to raise local awareness of its importance.

== Sources ==
- Bayburtluoğlu, Cevdet (2004). Lycia. Antalya: Suna & İnan Kıraç Research Institute on Mediterranean Civilizations. ISBN 978-97570-7-820-3.
- Bean, George Ewart (1978). Lycian Turkey: An Archaeological Guide. London: Benn. ISBN 978-05100-3-205-0.
- Bryce, Trevor (2009). "Letoum". The Routledge Handbook of the Peoples and Places of Ancient Western Asia. New York: Routledge. ISBN 978-0-415-39485-7.
- Clow, Kate (2000). The Lycian Way. Ankara: Upcountry (Turkey) Ltd. ISBN 978-09539-2-180-5.
- Dusinberre, Elspeth R. M. (2013). Empire, Authority, and Autonomy in Achaemenid Anatolia. Cambridge: Cambridge University Press. ISBN 978-11070-1-826-6.
- Greenhalgh, Michael (2009). Marble Past, Monumental Present: Building with Antiquities in the Mediaeval Mediterranean. Brill Publishers. ISBN 978-90041-7-083-4.
- Grimal, Pierre (1996) [1951]. The Dictionary of Classical Mythology. Oxford, New York: Blackwell. ISBN 978-06312-0-102-1.
