= Xanthos =

Ancient Lycian city in southwest Turkey

- Ksantos (Turkish)
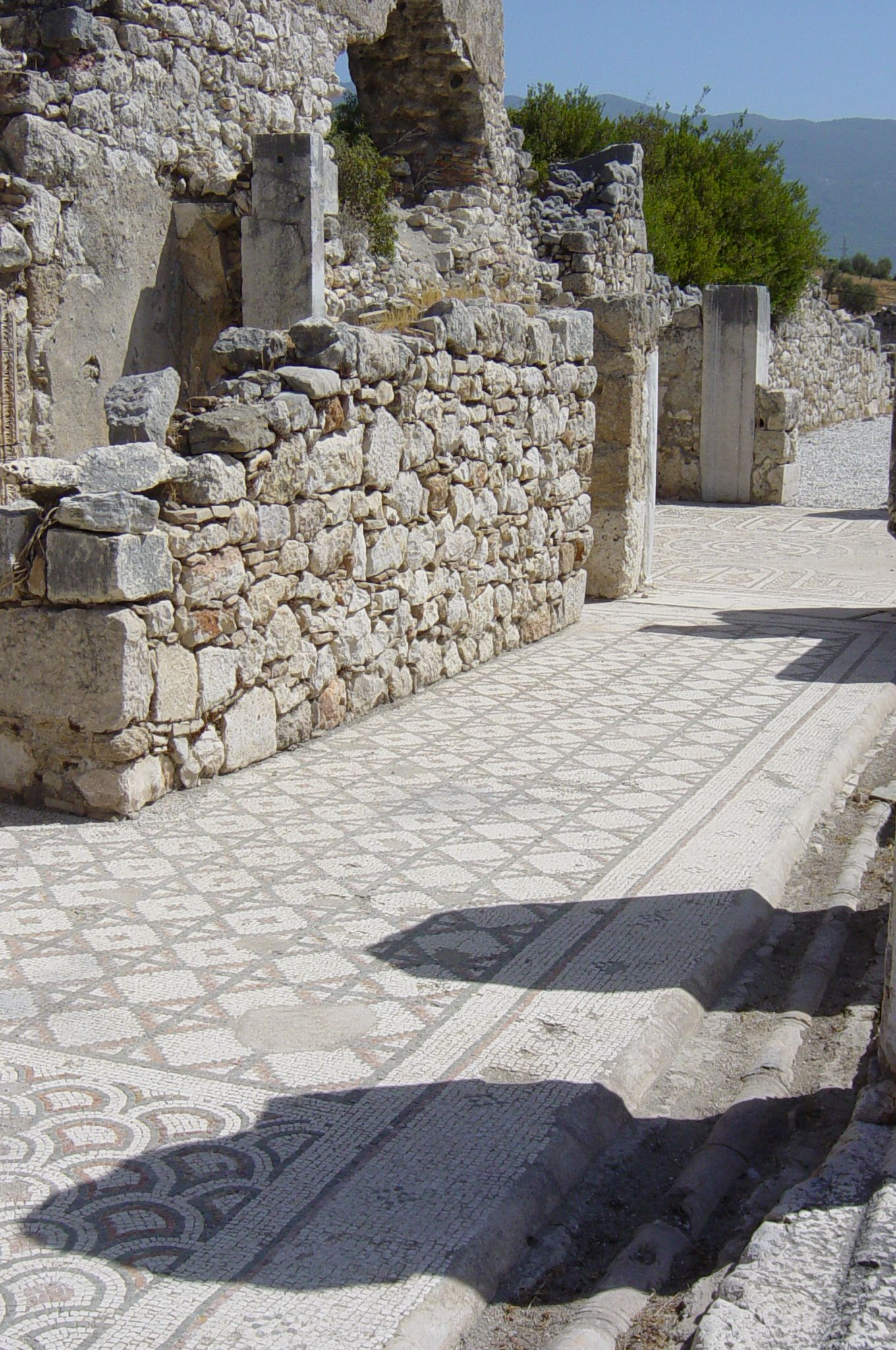
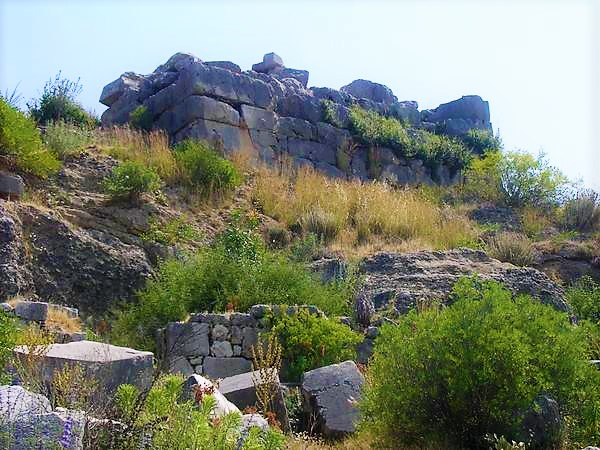
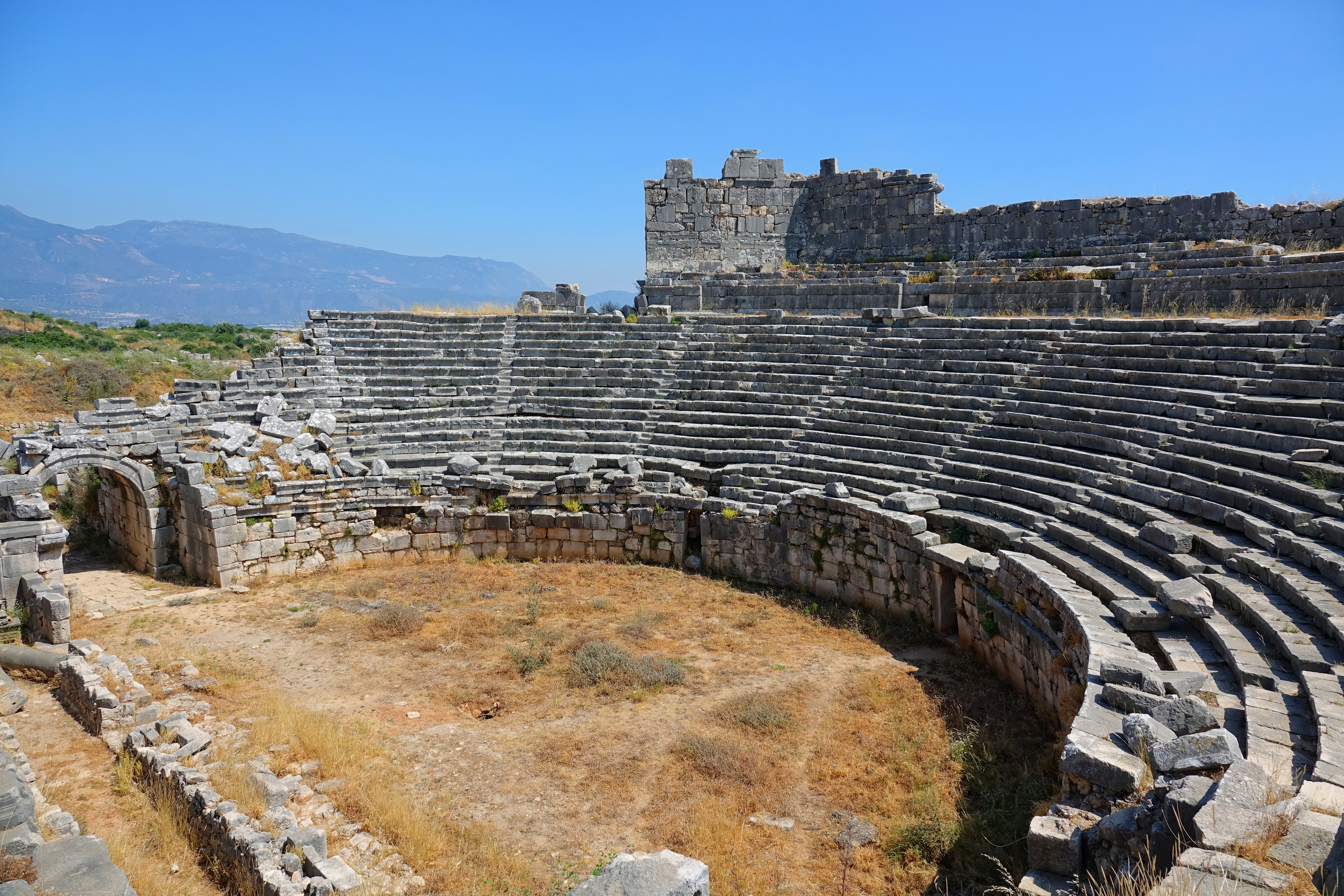
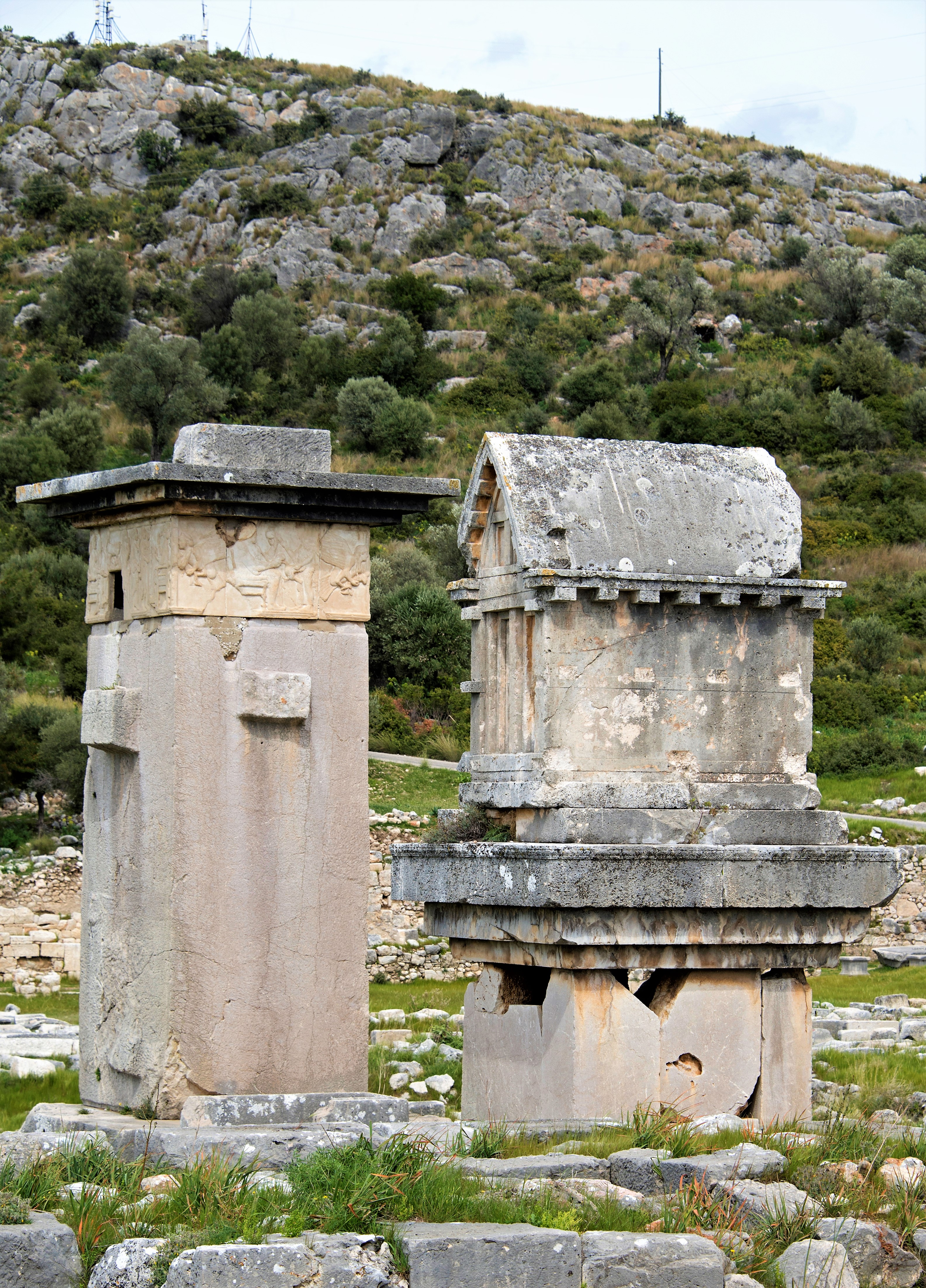
- Interactive map of Xanthos
- 36°21′22″N 29°19′7″E
- Type: Settlement
- Location: Kınık, Antalya Province, Turkey
- Region: Lycia

Site notes
- Area: 126 ha (310 acres)
- Website: turkishmuseums.com

UNESCO World Heritage Site
- Official name: Xanthos-Letoon
- Designated: 1988 (12th session)
- Reference no.: 484
- Europe and North America

Xanthos or Xanthus, also referred to by scholars as Arna, its Lycian name, (Turkish: Ksantos, Lycian: 𐊀𐊕𐊑𐊏𐊀 Arñna, Greek: Ξάνθος, Latin: Xanthus) was an ancient city near the present-day village of Kınık, in Antalya Province, Turkey. The ruins are located on a hill on the left bank of the River Xanthos. The number and quality of the surviving tombs at Xanthos are a notable feature of the site, which, together with nearby Letoon, was declared to be a UNESCO World Heritage Site in 1988.

The city of Xanthos was a centre of culture and commerce for the Lycians, and later for the Persians, Greeks and Romans who in turn conquered the region. Xanthos influenced its neighbours architecturally; the Nereid Monument directly inspired the Mausoleum at Halicarnassus in the region of Caria.

== History ==
The acropolis of Xanthos dates from the 8th century BCE. The city was mentioned by ancient Greek and Roman writers. The Greek historian Strabo noted that Xanthos was the largest city in Lycia. The important religious sanctuary of Leto at Letoon, 4 kilometres (2.5 mi) south of Xanthos, dates from the late 6th century BC, and was closely associated with the city and linked by a sacred road.

=== Under the Persian Empire ===
The Greek historians Herodotus and Appian both described the conquest of the city by the Median general Harpagus on behalf of the Persian Empire. According to Herodotus, the Persians defeated a small Lycian army in the flatlands to the north of the city in c. 540 BC. The Lycians retreated into the city, which Harpagus then besieged. The Lycians destroyed their acropolis, and killed their wives, children and slaves, before engaging the enemy in a suicidal attack.

During the Persian occupation, a local leadership was installed and by 520 BC it was minting coins. By 516 BC Xanthos had been included in the first Nomos of Darius I in the tribute list.

=== Conquest by Alexander the Great ===
From Telmessos the army of Alexander the Great marched over the mountains to Xanthos. There representatives from each of the cities of the Lycian League, including the port of Phaselis, personally offered the Lycians' submission, which was accepted. Alexander was encouraged when he found a sacred spring close to the River Xanthus, and obtained from there an inscribed bronze tablet that predicted that the Greeks would destroy the Persian Empire.

Reports differ on Xanthos's surrender to Alexander: Arrian describes a peaceful submission, but Appian claims that the city was sacked. After Alexander's death, Xanthos was captured by Ptolemy I Soter from Antigonus I Monophthalmus.

=== Roman period ===
Xanthus was in the Roman province of Lycia. In 42 BC, during the Liberators' civil war, Brutus came to Lycia to obtain funds before the Battle of Philippi. He besieged Xanthos after the Lycian League refused to contribute. The city was once again destroyed, and only 150 Xanthian men survived the carnage. Plutarch claims that the population of Xanthos deliberately set fire to their city in an act of mass suicide, comparable to their behavior during the Persian conquest generations earlier. Brutus and his Romans attempted rescue operations, and, in Plutarch's words, 150 men "did not escape having their lives saved". The city was rebuilt under Mark Antony.

Most of the buildings visible today were built during the later Empire. The town took on a grid plan. A large piazza with porticoes was built in the west, probably where the classical agora was. There was also a triple-naved building which may have started as a pagan basilica and then become a church. There was probably a large porticoed avenue terminated with a gateway.

=== Byzantine period ===
Xanthos, like the rest of Lycia, prospered in the later Roman period. Luxury houses were built on the Lycian acropolis. Several churches were also built, including a large basilica (74m x 29m), a small chapel, and another large basilica on the acropolis. In the sixth century, earthquakes damaged many buildings, and they were repaired. The city wall was also reinforced because of the Arab threat. The city was subsequently destroyed and deserted.

=== Ecclesiastical history ===
Xanthus was a suffragan of the Metropolitan Archbishopric of Myra.

In the Eastern Orthodox Church, Xanthoupolis was a titular diocese under the Ecumenical Patriarchate of Constantinople, whose bishop assisted the Metropolitan Province of Smyrna, part of the larger Province of Asia Minor. Its last known bishop was Father Ignatios, later Metropolitan of Libya under the Patriarchate of Alexandria, who presided over this diocese from 1863 to 1884.

In the Catholic Church, the diocese was nominally restored in 1933 as the Titular bishopric of Xanthus.

== Archaeology ==
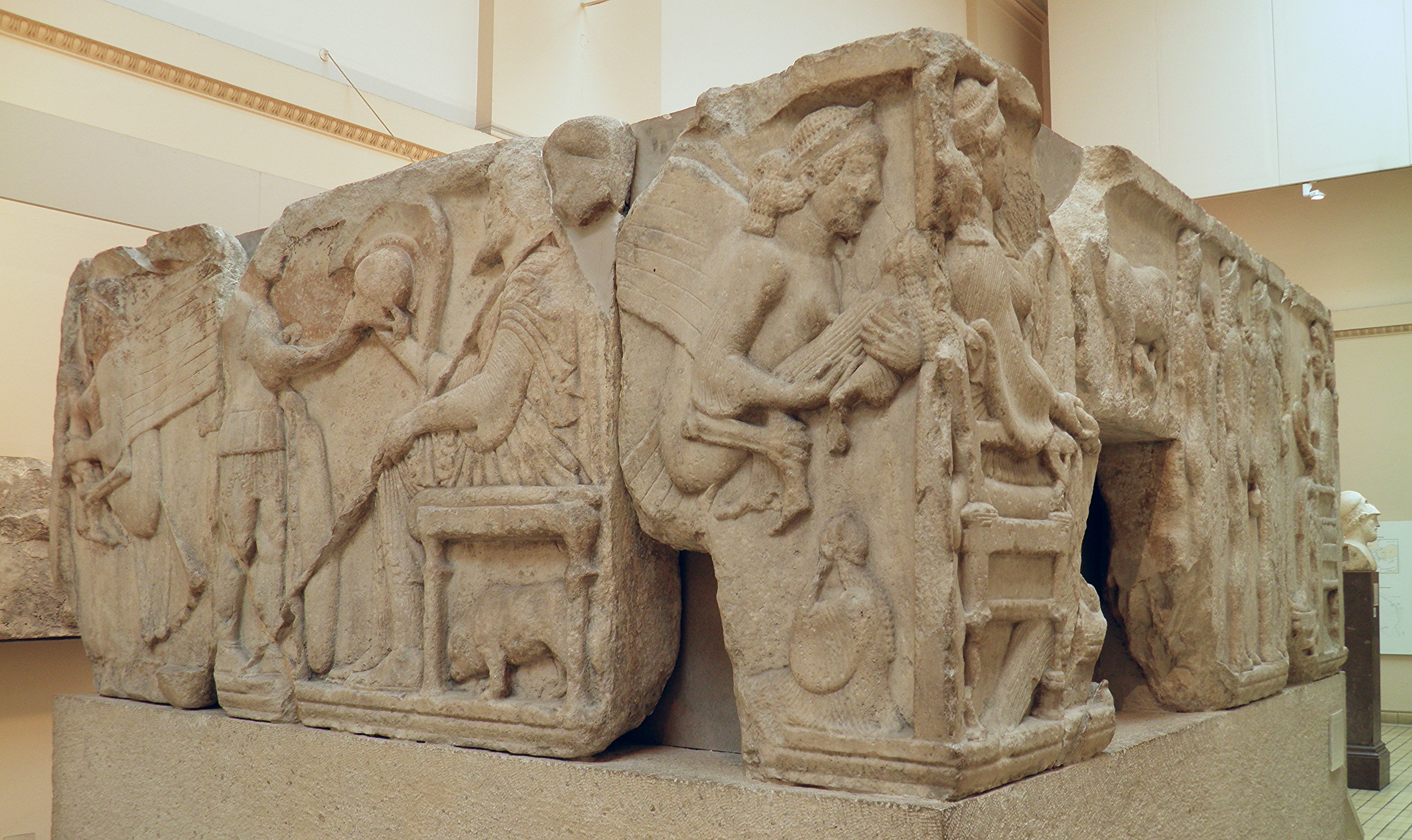
The Harpy Tomb sculptures in the British Museum

Excavations at Xanthos have shown that wooden structures were destroyed in c. 470 BC, probably by the Athenian Kimon. Xanthos was later rebuilt in stone.

The Nereid Monument, the Tomb of Payava, and the original sculptures of the Harpy Tomb are exhibited in the British Museum. The Harpy Tomb itself is located in its original location at Xanthos, now with replica reliefs.

The archeological excavations and surface investigations at Xanthos have yielded inscriptions in both the Lycian language and Greek, including bilingual texts that are useful in the understanding of Lycian. The Xanthian Obelisk, otherwise known as the Inscribed Pillar, is a trilingual stele which was found in the city; it records an older Anatolian language conventionally known as the Milyan.

== Location ==
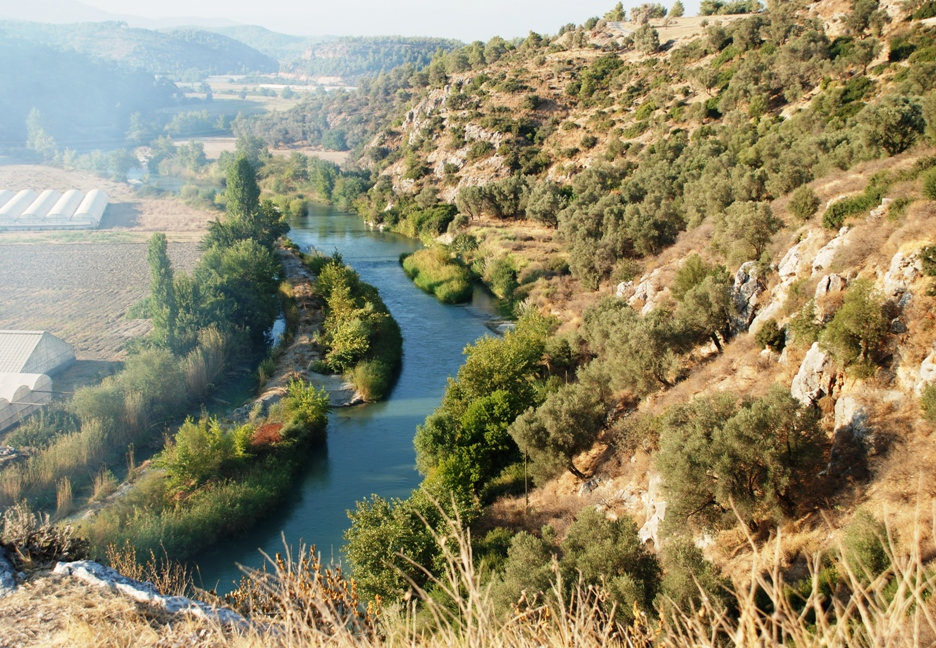
The River Xanthos, as seen from the ruins

Xanthos is located near to the modern village of Kınık.

== World Heritage Site ==
Xanthos was added as a UNESCO World Heritage Site, along with nearby Letoon, in 1988.

== See also ==
- Hermogenes of Xanthos

== Sources ==
- Akşit, İlhan (2006). Kline, Stuart (ed.). Lycia: The Land of Light. Istanbul: Aksit Kultur Turizm Sanat Ajans Lt. ISBN 975-7039-11-X.
- Bunson, Matthew (2014). Encyclopedia of the Roman Empire (Revised ed.). New York: Facts on File, Inc. ISBN 978-14381-1-027-1.
- Dusinberre, Elspeth R. M. (2013). Empire, Authority, and Autonomy in Achaemenid Anatolia. Cambridge: Cambridge University Press. ISBN 978-11070-1-826-6.
- Fitzpatrick-McKinley, Anne (2015). Empire, Power and Indigenous Elites: A Case Study of the Nehemiah Memoir. Leiden: Brill Publishers. ISBN 978-90042-9-222-2.
- Freeman, Philip (2011). Alexander the Great. New York: Simon & Schuster. ISBN 978-14391-9-328-0.
- Fried, Lisbeth S. (2004). The Priest and the Great King: Temple-palace Relations in the Persian Empire. Eisenbrauns. ISBN 978-15750-6-090-3.
- Jenkins, Ian (2006). Greek Architecture and its Sculpture. Cambridge, Massachusetts: Harvard University Press. ISBN 978-06740-2-388-8.
- Keen, Antony G. (1992). "The Dynastic Tombs of Xanthos: Who Was Buried Where?". Anatolian Studies. 42: 53–63. doi:10.2307/3642950. JSTOR 3642950. S2CID 161228800.
- Kinsey, Brian, ed. (2012). Gods and Goddesses of Greece and Rome. Tarrytown, New York: Marshall Cavendish Reference. ISBN 978-07614-9-980-0.
- Pius Bonifacius Gams, Series episcoporum Ecclesiae Catholicae, Leipzig 1931, p. 450
- Tempest, Kathryn (2017). Brutus: The Noble Conspirator. London: Yale University Press. ISBN 978-0-300-18009-1.
