= Cragus =

Cragus (Greek: Κράγος) may refer to:

== Places ==
- Mount Cragus, a peak in ancient Lycia
- Mount Cragus (Cilicia), a peak in ancient Cilicia
- Cragus (Lycia), a city near the first Mount Cragus
- Cragus (Cilicia), a city near the second Mount Cragus

== Other uses ==
- Cragus (mythology), in Greek mythology a Lycian god
- Cragus, a synonym for Wulfila, a genus of New World spiders
