= Chelidon (mythology) =

Greek mythological figures

In Greek mythology, Chelidon (Ancient Greek: Χελιδών, romanized: Khelidṓn, lit. 'swallow') may refer to the following women:

- Chelidon, a Lycian royalty as the daughter of prince Cragus, presumed eponym of the city Cragus or Mount Cragus. Her mother could be identified as Milye, eponym of the Milyae and sister-wife of Solymus, the eponym of the Solymi. By her uncle Tlous (eponym of Tlos), Chelidon bore Sidymos, the eponymous founder of the city of Sidyma.
- Chelidon, daughter of Pandareus, sister to Aëdon, and doublet of Philomela.
