= Sidymos =

In Greek mythology, Sidymos or Sidymus (Ancient Greek: Σίδυμος) was the eponymous founder of Sidyma, a town in Lycia. He was the son of Tloos, eponym of Tlos, by his niece Chelidon, daughter of Cragus, namesake of the city of Cragus or Mount Cragus.
