= Babadağ (mountain, Muğla) =

Mountain in Muğla Province, Turkey

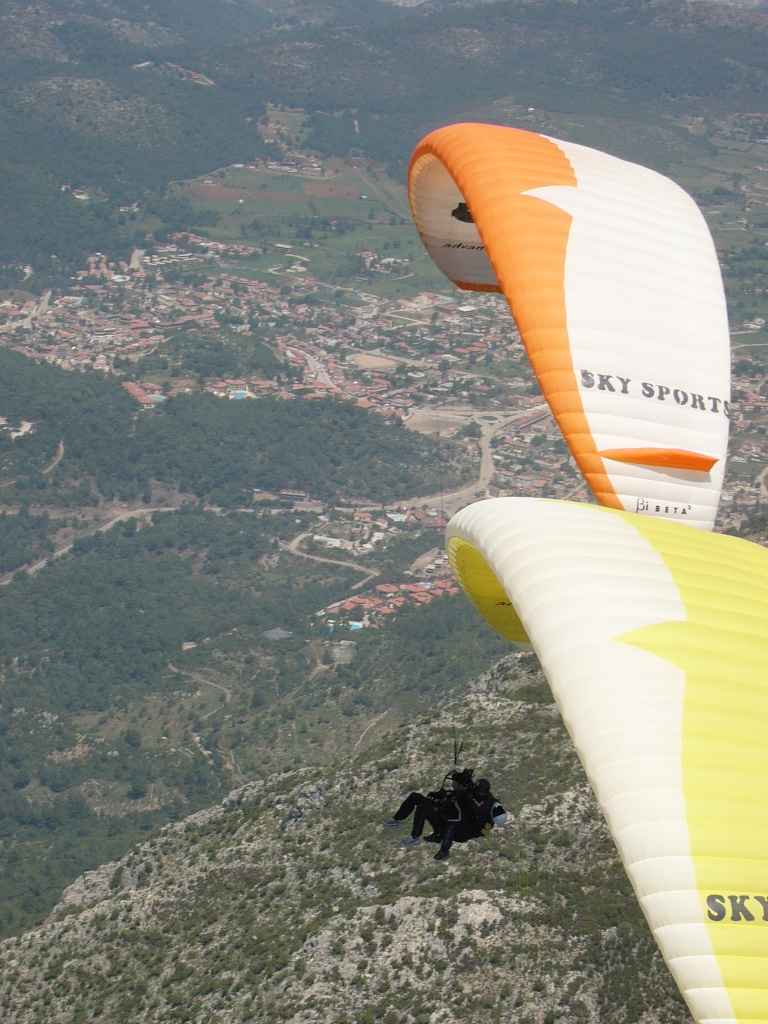

Highest point
- Elevation: 1,969 m (6,460 ft)
- Prominence: 1,763 m (5,784 ft)
- Listing: Ultra
- Coordinates: 36°31′42″N 29°11′06″E

Geography
- Location within Turkey
- Location: Fethiye, Muğla Province, Turkey

Babadağ is a mountain near Fethiye, in Muğla Province, southwest Turkey.

The mountain has a principal summit at an elevation of 1,969 metres (6,460 ft) and a second one called "Karatepe" at an elevation of 1,400 metres (4,593 ft). These two summits face each other and are separated by a flood valley, which led to the term "mountain range" to be used in some sources in association with Babadağ. The mass is composed mainly of limestone. It is noted for its rich flora, including the endemic Acer undulatum, and forests of Lebanon cedar (Cedrus libani).

It is also notable for the proximity of its summit to the sea (less than 5 km) which is one of the factors that make it particularly suitable and popular for paragliding.

== Babadağ, Mount Cragus and Anticragus ==
In ancient times, Mount Cragus (Ancient Greek: Κράγος), also spelled Mount Cragos or Mount Kragus, was a principal mountain of ancient Lycia, although ancient names are sometimes difficult to match with the features observed today.

Strabo (p. 665), whose description proceeds from west to east, after the promontory Telmissus, mentions Anticragus (Ancient Greek: Αντίκραγος), on which is Carmylessus, and then Cragus, which has eight "summits" (or he may have meant "capes"), and a city of the same name; Cragus (Lycia). Another city, Pinara, in the interior, was at the base of Cragus.

There are coins of the town Cragus of the Roman imperial period, with the epigraph Λυκιων Κρ. or Κρα. or Κραγ. The range of Anticragus and Cragus is represented in the map in Spratt and Forbes as running south from the neighbourhood of Telmissus, and forming the western boundary of the lower basin of the river Xanthus. The southern part is Cragus. The direction of the range shows that it must abut on the sea in bold headlands. In Francis Beaufort's map of the coast of Karamania, the Anticragus is marked 6000 feet high. Beaufort's examination of this coast began at Yediburun, which means "the Seven Capes", a knot of high and rugged mountains that appear to have been the ancient Mount Cragus of Lycia. The ruins of Pinara are where Strabo describes them, on the east side of this range, about halfway between Telmissus and the termination of the range on the south coast. There is a pass leading between the summits of Cragus and Anticragus. Between the two chief peaks is a plain 4000 feet above the sea; and above it rises the highest peak of Cragus, more than 2500 feet above this elevated plain. The first half of the ascent from the plain is through a thick forest, and the remainder over bare rock. From the summit there is a view of the whole plain of Xanthus, and of the gorges of the Massicytus, which lies east of it. The side towards the sea is so steep, that from this lofty summit the waves are seen breaking white against the base of this precipitous mountain mass. It appears that Strabo is right when he describes a valley or depression as separating Anticragus and Cragus; and the highest part, which towers above the sea at the Seven Capes, seems to be the eight summits that Strabo speaks of. There was a promontory Cragus, according to Scylax and Pliny the Elder (v. 27), which must be the Seven Capes. The Hiera Acra of the Stadiasmus seems also to be the Seven Capes. The position of the Cragus between Xanthus and Telmissus is mentioned by Pomponius Mela (i. 15), and he also probably means the same striking part of the range.

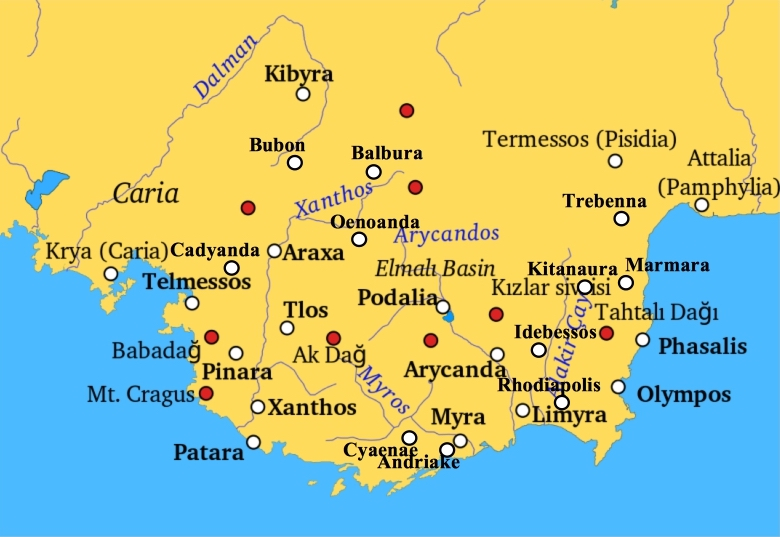
Map of Lycia showing significant major cities, mountains and rivers. Red dots are mountain peaks, white dots are ancient cities.

The rocks and forests of Cragus were embellished by poetic fictions as the occasional residence of Diana. Here, according to the authority quoted by Stephanus of Byzantium (s. v. Κράγος), were the so-called θεῶν ἀγρίων ἄντρα.

== Cycling ==
Stage three of the 2023 Presidential Cycling Tour of Türkiye took a 104.1 kilometre route from Fethiye to the highest point on the road up Babadağ. It was described as "one of the hardest climbs ever featured in a professional bike race". The stage was won by Alexey Lutsenko, and the final 18.12 km of the route took 1:12:32.

== See also ==
- Mount Cragus
- Cragus (Lycia)
- Telmissus
- Pinara
- Patara (Lycia)
- List of ultras of West Asia
- Butterfly Valley, Fethiye
- Paragliding

== Other sources ==
- Hiking Babadağ: Index
