= Antiochia ad Cragum =

Human settlement

- Antiochetta, Antiocheta, Antiochia Parva, Antiocheta in Rufine
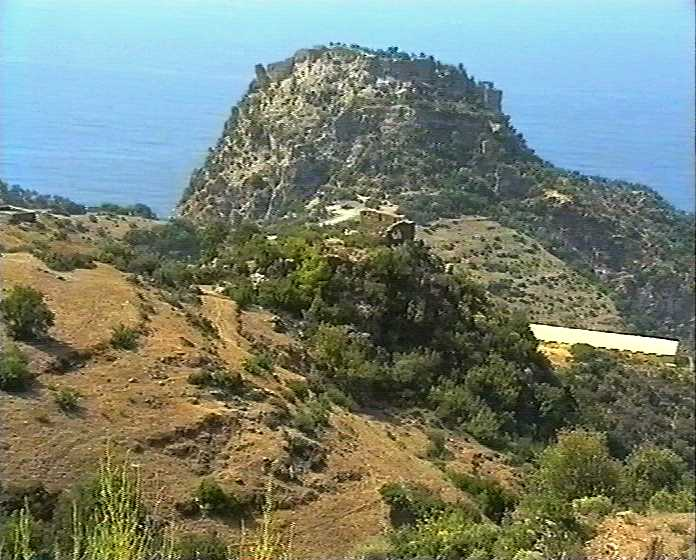
- Some ruins at Antiochia ad Cragum

- Location within Turkey
- 36°09′26″N 32°24′56″E
- Type: Settlement
- Cultures: Hellenistic, Roman, Armenian, Byzantine, Medieval
- Location: Antalya Province, Turkey
- Region: Cilicia

History
- Built: 170 BC

Site notes
- Excavation dates: 2005-2019
- Archaeologists: Michael Hoff, Timothy Howe, Rhys Townsend, Ece Erdoğmuş, Birol Can
- Condition: In ruins
- Management: University of Nebraska–Lincoln

Antiochia ad Cragum (Greek: Αντιόχεια του Κράγου; Ἀντιόχεια ἐπὶ Κράγῳ) also known as Antiochetta or Latin: Antiochia Parva (meaning "Little Antiochia") is an ancient Hellenistic city on Mount Cragus overlooking the Mediterranean coast, in the region of Cilicia, in Anatolia. In modern-day Turkey the site is encompassed in the village of Güneyköy, District of Gazipaşa, Antalya Province.

== History ==
The city was founded by Antiochus IV Epiphanes around 170 BC. It minted coins from the mid-first to the mid-third centuries, the last known of which were issued under Roman Emperor Valerian. The city became part of the kingdom of Lesser Armenia in the 12th century. In 1332, the Knights Hospitallers took the city, after which it was known variously as Antiochetta, Antiocheta, Antiocheta in Rufine (Papal bull of Pope John XXII), and Antiochia Parva.

Some scholars claim an identity of Antiochia ad Cragum with the city Cragus (Kragos), or although it lies more than 100 km away, with Sidyma, which some scholars assert was the Lycian Cragus (Kragos).

== Archaeology ==
Ruins of the city remain, and include fortifications, baths, chapels, the Roman necropolis, a wine press, and some roman mosaics found.

In 2018, latrine mosaics with dirty jokes about Narcissus and Ganymede were discovered in Antiochia ad Cragum, and in 2019, a large pool mosaic was discovered near the city.

== Bishopric ==
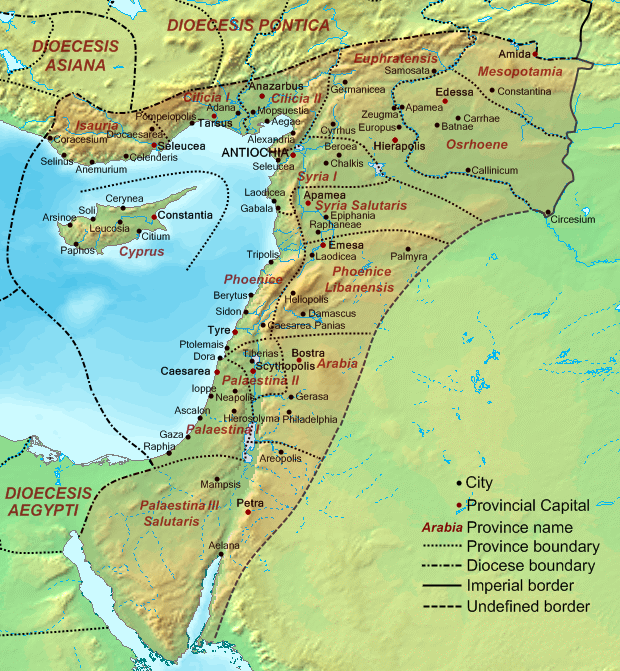
Dioecesis Orientis 400 AD

In Byzantine times, Antiochia Parva was the seat of an episcopal see of the Roman province of Isauria in the Diocese of the East. It was part of the Patriarchate of Antioch and was suffragan of the Archbishopric of Seleucia.

The five known ancient bishops of this diocese were:

- Antonius took part in the First Council of Nicaea in 325.
- Theodosius in the First Council of Constantinople in 381.
- Acacius was among the fathers of the Council of Chalcedon in 451.
- Zacharias took part in the Trullan Council of 692
- Theophanes finally witnessed the council held in Constantinople in 879–880 that rehabilitated the patriarch Photius of Constantinople.

The Roman Catholic Diocese of Antiochia Parva is no longer a residential bishopric. It is today listed as a suppressed and titular see of the Roman Catholic Church. The seat is vacant since April 11, 1964. It was held previously by:

- Jacques-Eugène Louis Ménager (June 23, 1955 – December 7, 1961)
- André-Jean-Marie Charles de la Brousse (January 26, 1962 – April 11, 1964) (Note: Lequien gives Bishop Theophan, episcopus Antiochiae parvae, both home to Antioch in Isauria, and namesake in Caria.)
