= Cragus (mythology) =

Lycian god

In Greek mythology, Cragus (Ancient Greek: Κράγος, romanized: Krágos) was a Lycian god identified with Zeus, and humanized into a son of Tremiles, eponym of Tremile which was afterwards named Lycia.

== Family ==
Cragus' mother was the nymph Praxidice, daughter of Ogygus, and brother of Tlos, Pinarus and Xanthus. Cragus may be identical with the figure of the same name mentioned as the husband of Milye, sister-wife of Solymus, eponym of the Solymi. Possibly by Milye, he became the father of Chelidon, mother of Sidymus (eponym of Sidyma).

== Mythology ==
It was after Cragus that Mount Cragus and/or the city of Cragus were named. He was worshipped as the god of victory and strength.
