= Tloos =

In Greek mythology, Tloos (Ancient Greek: Τλῶος) or Tlos (Τλῶς) was the eponym of Tlos, a Lycian city.

== Family ==
Tlos was the son of Tremilus who named after himself the land he settled, Tremile, which later became Lycia. His mother was the nymph Praxidice, daughter of Ogygus, and was brother of Pinarus, Cragus and Xanthus. Tlos married his niece Chelidon, Cragus' daughter, and fathered by her Sidymos, eponymous founder of the town of Sidyma in Lycia.
