= Praxidice =

Goddess of judicial punishment

In Greek mythology, Praxidice or Praxidike (Ancient Greek: Πραξιδίκη, [praksidíkɛː], lit. "Applied Justice") may refer to the following characters:

- Praxidice was a goddess of enforced justice, responsible for ensuring that justice was carried out among mortals, and was sometimes identified with Dike.
- Praxidice, according to the Orphic Hymn to Persephone, was an epithet of Persephone: "Praxidike, subterranean queen. The Eumenides' source [mother], fair-haired, whose frame proceeds from Zeus' ineffable and secret seeds." As praxis "practice, application" of dike "justice", she is sometimes identified with Dike, goddess of justice.
- Praxidice, according to Stephanus of Byzantium, a daughter of Ogygus named Praxidike, married to Tremiles (after whom Lycia had been previously named Tremile) and had by him four sons: Tlos, Xanthus, Pinarus and Cragus. In one account, all sons were mentioned except Xanthus to be the progeny of Praxidice and Tremilus. Of them, Tlos had a Lycian city named Tlos after himself. Cragus may be identical with the figure of the same name mentioned as the husband of Milye, sister of Solymus.

The plural Praxidicae (Ancient Greek: Πραξιδίκαι, Praxidikai) refers to the following groups of mythological figures who presided over exacting of justice:

- Arete and Homonoia, daughters of Praxidice and Soter, sisters to Ktesios.
- Alalcomenia, Thelxionoea and Aulis, daughters of the early Boeotian king Ogyges. At Haliartos in Boeotia, Pausanias saw the open-air "sanctuary of the goddesses whom they call Praxidikae. Here the Haliartians swear, but the oath is not one they take lightly". Their images only portrayed their heads, and only heads of animals were sacrificed to them.

== See also ==
=== Goddesses of Justice and related concepts ===
- (Goddesses of Justice): Astraea, Dike, Themis, Eunomia, Prudentia, Praxidice.
- (Goddesses of Injustice): Adikia
- (Aspects of Justice):
  - (Justice) Themis/Dike/Eunomia/Justitia (Lady Justice), Raguel (the Angel of Justice)
  - (Retribution) Nemesis/Rhamnousia/Rhamnusia/Adrasteia/Adrestia/Invidia, Kushiel (Angel of Punishment)
  - (Redemption) Eleos/Soteria/Clementia, Zadkiel/Zachariel (the Angel of Mercy)
- Durga, Hindu goddess of justice.
- Lady Justice.

=== Gods of Justice ===
- Shani, Hindu god of justice.
- Yama and Chitragupta duo, Brekyirihunuade
- Forseti (Norse God of Justice)
- Takhar (God of justice and vengeance in Serer religion)

=== Astronomy ===
- 5 Astraea, 24 Themis, 99 Dike, 269 Justitia and 547 Praxedis, main belt asteroids all named for Astraea, Themis, Dike and Justitia, Classical goddesses of justice.
  - Praxidike (moon), a moon of Jupiter.
