= Kalabantia =

Town of ancient Lycia

Kalabantia (Ancient Greek: Καλαβαντία) or Kalabatia (Καλαβατία) was a town of ancient Lycia, which per the Stadiasmus Patarensis was 24 stadia by road from Sidyma.

Its site is located approximately 4 kilometers west of Boğaziçi village, which is part of the Seydikemer district in Muğla Province, Asiatic Turkey.
