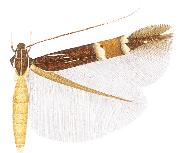

Scientific classification
- Kingdom: Animalia
- Phylum: Arthropoda
- Clade: Pancrustacea
- Class: Insecta
- Order: Lepidoptera
- Family: Cosmopterigidae
- Genus: Cosmopterix
- Species: C. chaldene

Binomial name
- Cosmopterix chaldene Koster, 2010

= Cosmopterix chaldene =

Species of moth

Cosmopterix chaldene is a moth of the family Cosmopterigidae. It is known from the Federal District of Brazil.

Adults were collected in September.

== Description ==
Male. Forewing length 3.3 mm. Head: frons shining grey with greenish and reddish reflections, vertex shining bronze brown, neck tufts shining dark bronze brown with reddish reflection, laterally and medially lined white, collar shining dark bronze brown; labial palpus first segment very short, white, second segment four-fifths of the length of third, dark brown with white longitudinal lines laterally and ventrally, third segment white, lined dark brown laterally; scape dorsally shining dark brown with white anterior and dorsal lines, ventrally shining white, antenna shining dark brown with a short white line from base changing to an interrupted line to beyond one-half, remaining part of antenna missing. Thorax and tegulae shining bronze brown with reddish gloss, thorax with a white median line, tegulae narrowly lined white inwardly. Legs: shining greyish brown, femora of hindleg ochreous-grey, foreleg with a white line on tibia and tarsal segments, except segment four, midlegs missing, tibia of hindleg with white oblique basal and medial lines and a white apical ring, tarsal segments one and two with white apical rings, segment five dorsally white, spurs white, ventrally greyish brown. Forewing shining dark bronze brown with reddish gloss, three white lines of about equal length in the basal area, a subcostal from one-tenth to one fifth, bending from costa distally, a medial above fold, its centre under the distal end of the subcostal, a subdorsal slightly further from base than the medial, a few white scales on dorsum beyond base, a yellowish brown transverse fascia beyond the middle, only slightly paler than the ground colour of the forewing, bordered at the inner edge by a tubercular pale golden metallic fascia, slightly narrowing at costa and with a subcostal patch of blackish brown scales on outside, bordered at the outer edge by two tubercular pale golden metallic costal and dorsal spots, the dorsal spot a little larger and slightly more towards base, both spots very close to each other or connected in the middle, forming a fascia, a small white costal streak connected to the costal spot, the apical line as a pale golden spot in the middle on dorsum of the apical area and a white streak in the cilia at apex, cilia bronze brown at apex, paler towards dorsum. Hindwing shining greyish brown, cilia pale brown. Underside: forewing shining greyish brown, the white costal and apical streak distinctly visible, hindwing shining brownish grey. Abdomen dorsally yellowish brown, ventrally brownish grey, segments banded shining white posteriorly, anal tuft yellowish white.

== Etymology ==
The species is named after Chaldene, a moon of Jupiter. To be treated as a noun in apposition.
