= Milye =

In Greek mythology: local eponymous heroine

In Greek mythology, Milye (Ancient Greek: Μιλύη, romanized: Milúē) was a local eponymous heroine and sister of Solymus, thus possible daughter of Zeus and Chaldene or Calchedonia. Her first husband was her own brother and later on Cragus, son of Tremilus and the nymph Praxidice.
