= Chaldene (mythology) =

Mythological woman

In Greek mythology, Chaldene (Ancient Greek: Χαλδήνη or Χαλδηνή) was the daughter of Pisidus, the eponymous founder of Pisidia. Other variations of her name were Caldene (Ancient Greek: Καλδήνη) or Calchedonia.

== Family ==
Caldene bore to Zeus the ancestral hero of the Solymi, Solymus, and possibly of his sister, Milye, the local eponymous heroine of the Milyae. In another version, Caldene has Solymus by Ares, the god of war.

== Legacy ==
Chaldene, one of the moons of the planet Jupiter was named after her.
