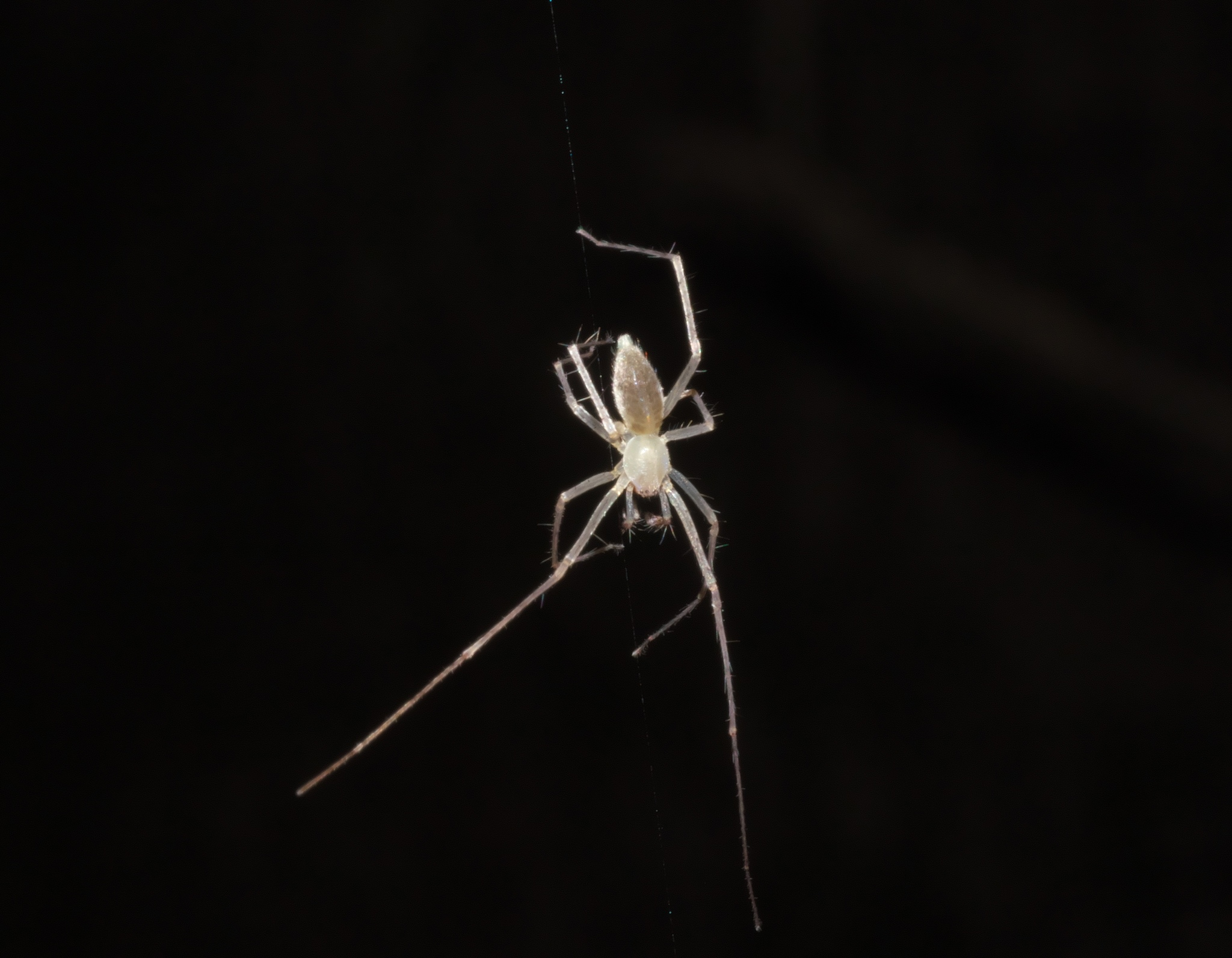
- Wulfila albens, Oklahoma

Scientific classification
- Domain: Eukaryota
- Kingdom: Animalia
- Phylum: Arthropoda
- Subphylum: Chelicerata
- Class: Arachnida
- Order: Araneae
- Infraorder: Araneomorphae
- Family: Anyphaenidae
- Genus: Wulfila
- Species: W. albens

Binomial name
- Wulfila albens (Hentz, 1847)

= Wulfila albens =

Species of spider

Wulfila albens is a species of ghost spider in the family Anyphaenidae. It is found in the United States.
