= Chaldene =

Moon of Jupiter

- Chaldene imaged by the Canada-France-Hawaii Telescope in December 2001

Discovery
- Discovered by: Scott S. Sheppard; David C. Jewitt; Yanga R. Fernandez; Eugene A. Magnier
- Discovery site: Mauna Kea Observatory
- Discovery date: 23 November 2000

Designations
- Designation: Jupiter XXI
- Pronunciation: /kælˈdiːniː/
- Named after: Χαλδηνή Chaldēnē
- Alternative names: S/2000 J 10
- Adjectives: Chaldenean /kældɪˈniːən/

Orbital characteristics
- Epoch 27 April 2019 (JD 2458600.5)
- Observation arc: 25 years 2025-12-21 (last obs)
- Semi-major axis: 0.1604721 AU (24,006,280 km)
- Eccentricity: 0.1500864
- Orbital period (sidereal): –759.88 d
- Mean anomaly: 159.35152°
- Mean motion: 0° 28^{m} 25.54^{s} / day
- Inclination: 164.25379° (to ecliptic)
- Longitude of ascending node: 215.26817°
- Argument of perihelion: 340.66981°
- Satellite of: Jupiter
- Group: Carme group

Physical characteristics
- Mean diameter: 4 km
- Albedo: 0.04 (assumed)
- Spectral type: B–V = 0.82 ± 0.05, V–R = 0.50 ± 0.05
- Apparent magnitude: 22.5
- Absolute magnitude (H): 16.0

Chaldene /kælˈdiːniː/, also known as Jupiter XXI, is a retrograde irregular satellite of Jupiter. It was discovered by a team of astronomers from the University of Hawaiʻi led by Scott S. Sheppard, in 2000, and given the temporary designation S/2000 J 10.

Chaldene is about 3.8 kilometres in diameter, and orbits Jupiter at an average distance of 22,713,000 km in 759.88 days, at an inclination of 167° to the ecliptic (169° to Jupiter's equator), in a retrograde direction and with an eccentricity of 0.2916.

It was named in October 2002 after Chaldene, the mother of Solymos by Zeus in Greek mythology.

It belongs to the Carme group, made up of irregular retrograde moons orbiting Jupiter at a distance ranging between 23 and 24 million km and at an inclination of about 165°.
