= Herippe =

Greek folktale heroine

In a Greek folktale told by Parthenius, Herippe (Ancient Greek: Ἡρίππη, romanized: Hēríppē), also known as Euthymia (Ancient Greek: Εὐθυμία, romanized: Euthumía, lit. 'good-spirited'), was a woman from Miletus, wife of Xanthus and mother of an unnamed two-year-old child. Herippe was carried off by invading Gauls, prompting her husband to go on a long journey to retrieve her back.

== Family ==
Herippe was of unknown lineage. She married Xanthus and they lived in Miletus, an ancient Greek city on the western coast of Asia Minor. They had a child who was two years old at the time of its mother's abduction.

== Mythology ==
During the celebration of Thesmophoria, Herippe and many other women were carried off by the invading Gauls. Some of the captives were ransomed by their relatives, but Herippe was among those who were not, and thus was taken to Gaul. Xanthus, deeply missing his wife, turned most of his possessions into gold and headed on to the land of Celts, hoping to find and ransom Herippe. The Gaul who had abducted Herippe, in some versions called Caravas, received Xanthus in a most hospitable manner; when Xanthus offered him one thousand pieces of gold for his wife, the host bade his guest to give only one quarter of the sum as ransom, and leave the other three quarters for himself and his family.

When Xanthus had a chance to talk to Herippe, she scolded him for having promised to the barbarian a sum of money he did not possess, but Xanthus assured her that he had another two thousand to spare, hidden in his servant's shoes. Herippe then told the Gaul of the total sum of gold Xanthus had with him, and suggested that they kill him and take the money; she further confessed that she liked the Gaul and his land far more than Greece and Xanthus, and wished to stay with the Celts. The Gaul was disgusted at her words; in his eyes, such disloyalty deserved punishment by death.

The next morning he announced that a sacrifice must be made before he would let Xanthus and Herippe go; a sacrificial animal was brought, and the Gaul asked Herippe to hold it. She took the animal, as she was already accustomed to participate in Gaulish sacrificial rites. The Gaul then raised his sword and, instead of slaying the animal, beheaded Herippe. He then explained her treachery to Xanthus and let him go, telling him to leave all the gold for himself.

== Legacy ==
The story of Herippe has been interpreted by later scholars and storytellers as a moral and cultural allegory reflecting Greek attitudes toward virtue, loyalty, and foreign peoples. Her betrayal of Xanthus, juxtaposed with the Gaul’s unexpected sense of justice and honour, was often seen as a reversal of expected moral roles — showing that integrity and righteousness could be found even among those deemed “barbarians.” The tale also underscores the fragility of human devotion when tested by desire and circumstance. In literary analysis, Herippe’s character has been discussed as a tragic example of moral weakness and the consequences of unfaithfulness, while the Gaul’s actions embody an ideal of noble conduct that transcends national or ethnic boundaries. Over time, the myth came to symbolise the triumph of moral virtue over deceit and the enduring human fascination with loyalty and retribution across cultural divides.
