= Pinara =

Large ancient city of Lycia

- τὰ Πίναρα (Greek)
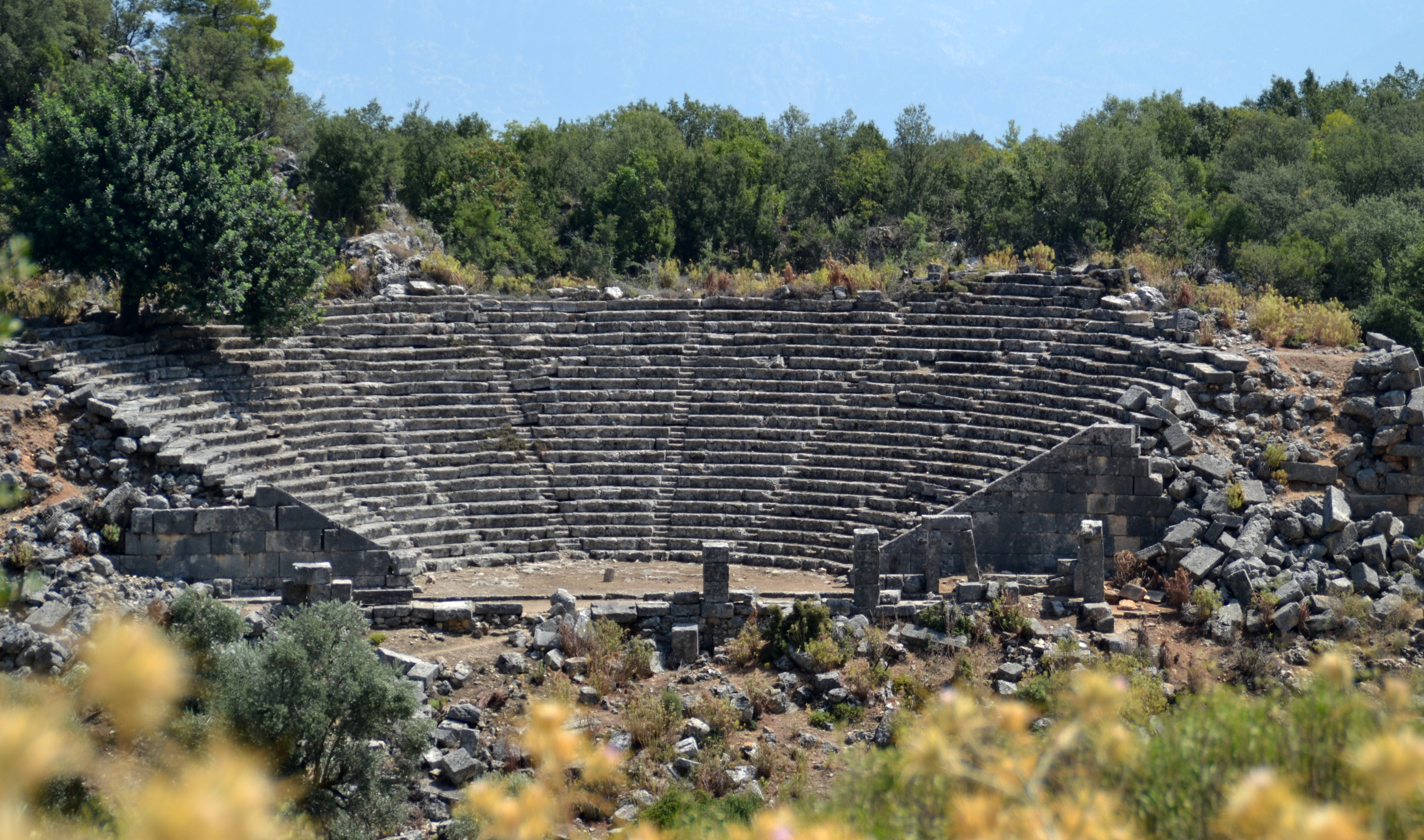
- The theatre of Pinara.

- Location within Turkey
- 36°29′19″N 29°15′07″E
- Type: Settlement
- Location: Minare, Muğla Province, Turkey
- Region: Lycia

Site notes
- Website: turkishmuseums.com

Pinara (Lycian: 𐊓𐊆𐊍𐊍𐊁𐊑𐊏𐊆 Pilleñni, presumably from the adjective "round"; Greek: τὰ Πίναρα, formerly Artymnesus or Artymnesos according to one account) was a large city of ancient Lycia at the foot of Mount Cragus (now Mount Babadağ), and not far from the western bank of the River Xanthos, homonymous with the ancient city of Xanthos (now Eşen River).

The remains of several ancient temples can be seen in Pinara, as well as rock tombs including one "royal tomb", an upper and a lower acropolis, a theatre, an odeon, an agora and a church. The name Pinara has somewhat been assimilated to the name of the present-day village of Minare, half an hour below the ruins and depending Fethiye district of Muğla Province, Turkey.

== Name ==
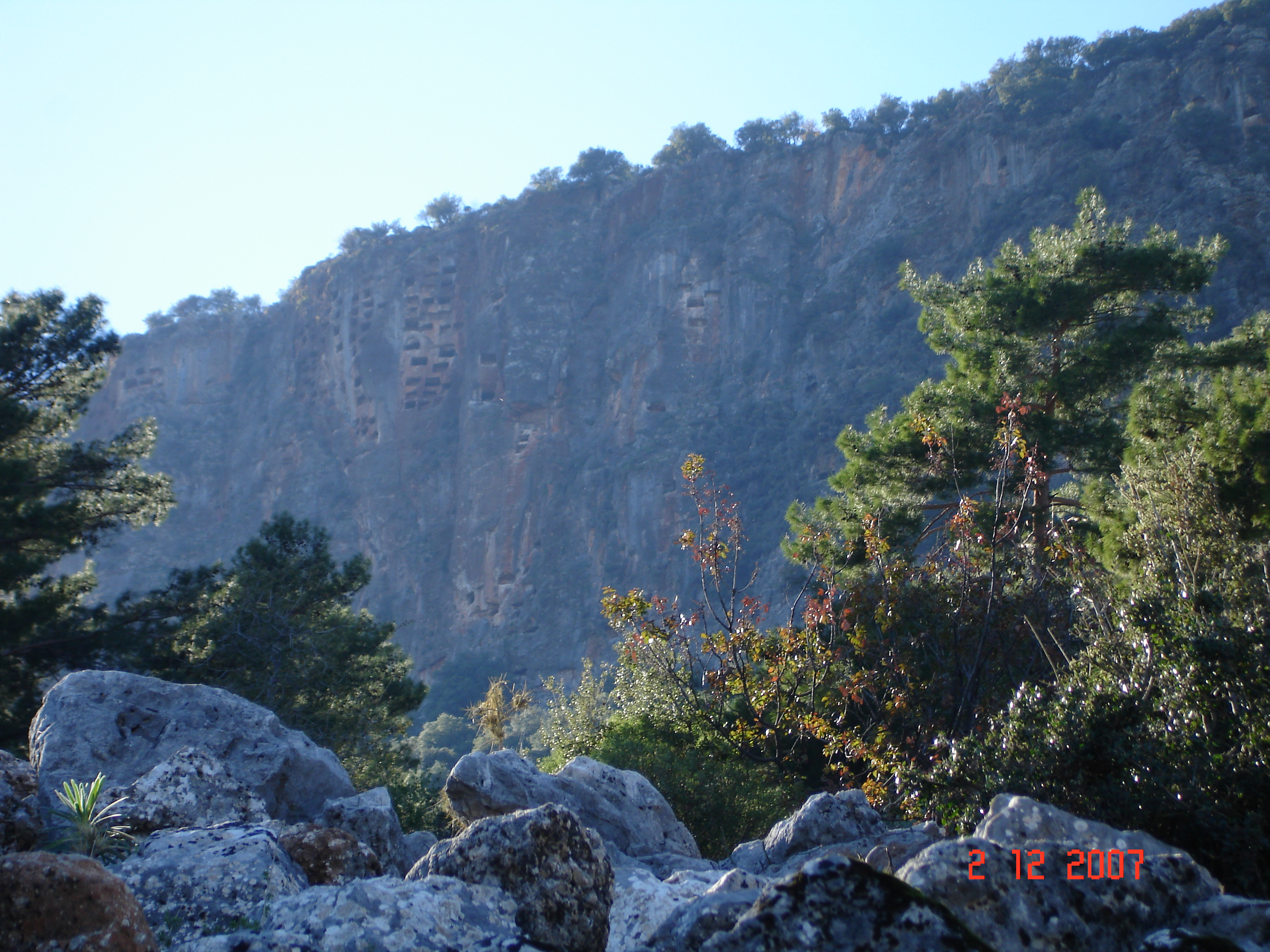
Crag with rock-cut tombs towering over Pinara situated on a "round" mass of rock, believed to have given the ancient city its name.

There was a cult of Pandarus, the Lycian hero of the Trojan War, in Pinara, which led some sources to conclude that he was a native of the city.

According to the Lycian history of Menecrates, quoted by Stephanus of Byzantium the city was a colony of Xanthos, its original name would be Artymnesos (Ancient Greek: Ἀρτύμνησος). This name would have preceded the Lycian language name Pinara, derived from the form "Pilleñni" or "Pinale" meaning a "round hill" or simply "round", based on a hypothesis of interchange of liquid consonants. The town is indeed situated on such a great round mass of rock and a more or less circular crag towers over the ruins. Another source, Panyassis, also mentions an eponymous founder by name Pinarus, son of Tremiles or Termilus, and this account is viewed by some sources as unsubstantial as the rest relating to the precedence of names.

== History ==
The city, though not often mentioned by ancient writers, appears from its vast and beautiful ruins to have been, as Strabo asserts, one of Lycia's largest, its chief port city until the harbor silted up to form the reed-filled wetlands of today.

Yet another rare mention of the city in ancient sources is in connection with the help it provided, along with several other Lycian cities, to Pixodarus of Caria.

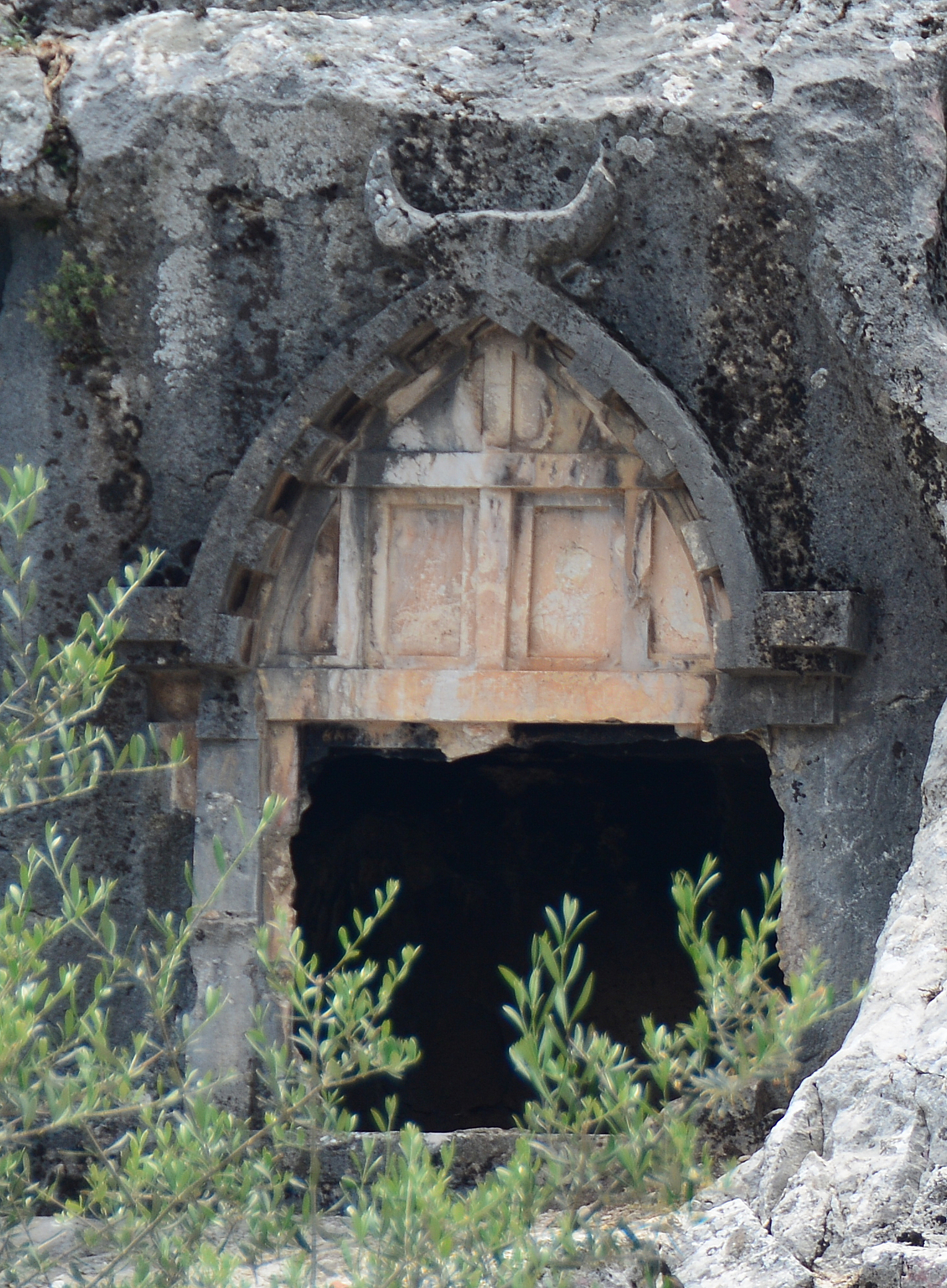
Ogival rock-cut tomb at Pinara, 4th century BC.

Pinara was a member of the Lycian League, in which it held three votes. The city surrendered to Alexander the Great in 334 BCE. After Alexander's death, the city fell to the kingdom of Pergamum. Pinara became a Roman city when Pergamum was willed by its last king Attalus III to the Roman Republic in 133 BCE. The city enjoyed prosperity during Roman rule, but was badly damaged by earthquakes in 141 and 240 CE. In the first occurrence, the city is recorded to have received a contribution from Opramoas for the repair of public buildings.

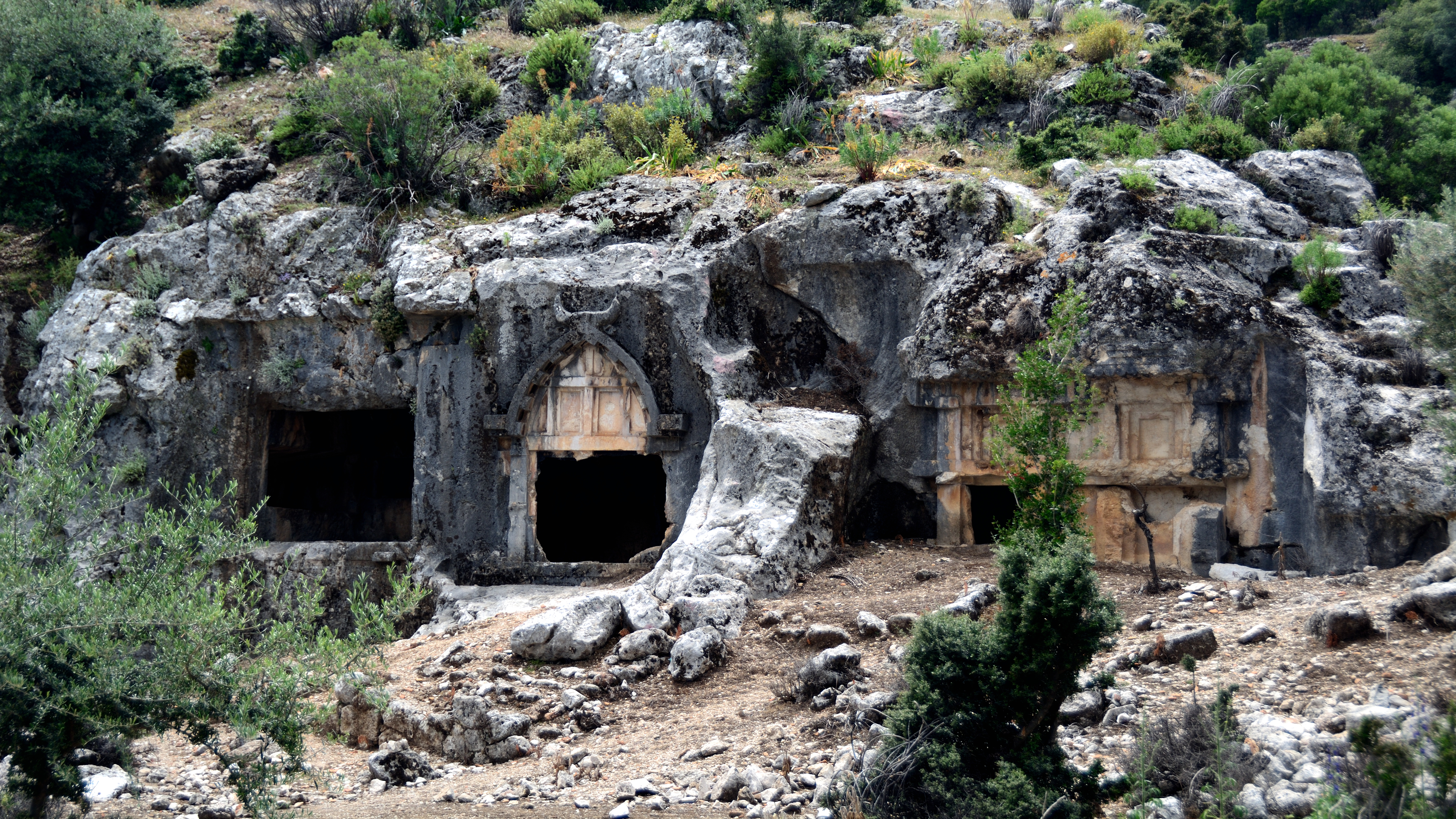
Rock-cut tombs in Pinara.

Pinara was Christianized early. Five bishops are known: Eustathius, who signed the formula of Acacius of Cæsarea at the Council of Seleucia in 359; Heliodorus, who signed the letter from the bishops of Lycia to the emperor Leo I the Thracian (458); Zenas, present at the Trullan Council (692); Theodore, at the Second Council of Nicaea (787); Athanasius, at the synod that reinstated Patriarch Photius I of Constantinople (the Photian Council) in 879. Pinara was the birthplace of Nicolas of Myra. Under repeated pressure from invading forces, the city lost its inhabitants in the ninth century.

== Scientific discovery ==
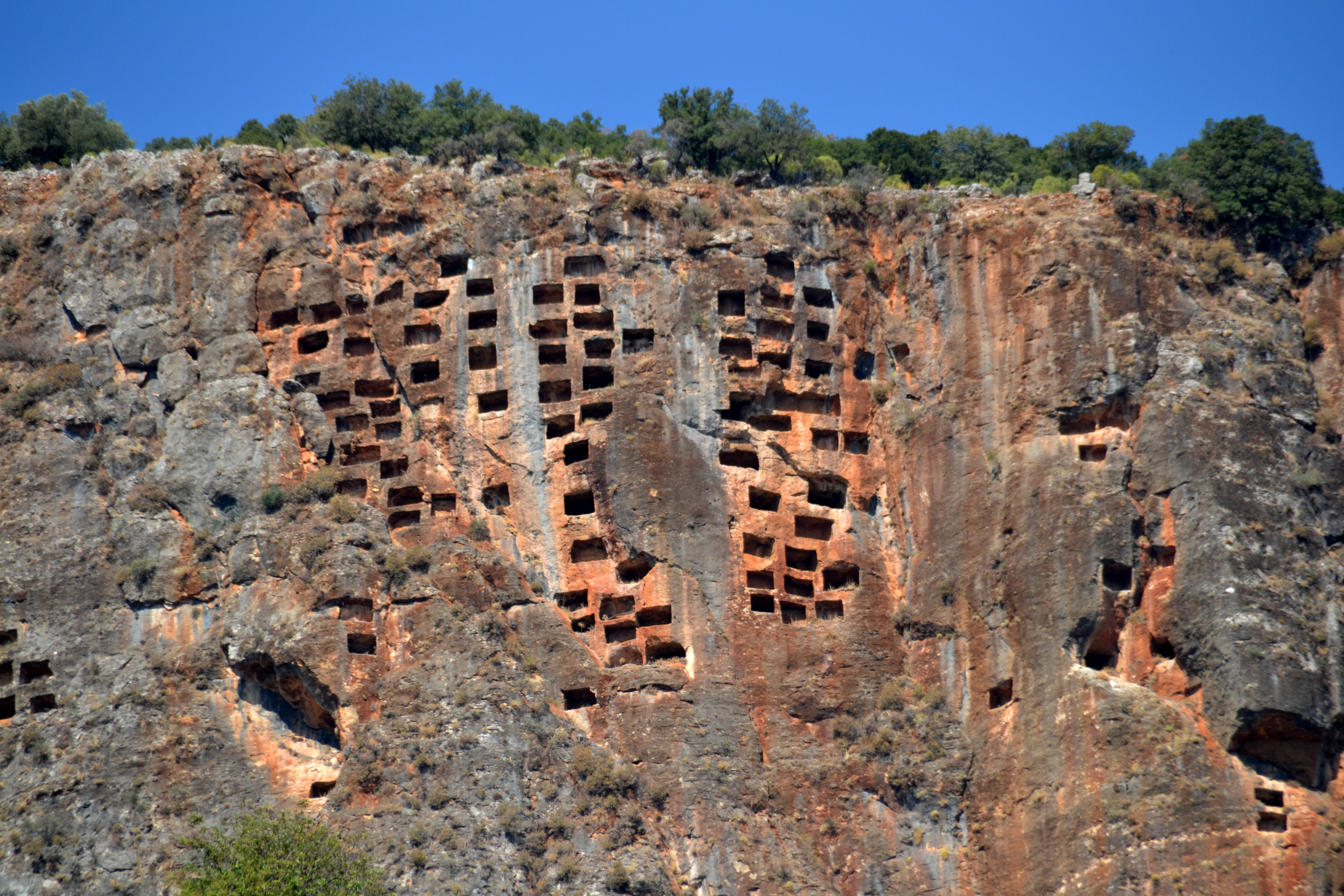
Tombs cut into a cliff-face, Pinara

Pinara's ruins were identified by Sir Charles Fellows. From amidst the ancient city, he says, rises a singular round rocky cliff (the pinara of the Lycians), literally speckled all over with tombs. Beneath this cliff lie the ruins of the extensive and splendid city. The theater is in a very perfect state; all the seats are remaining, with the slanting sides towards the proscenium, as well as several of its doorways. The walls and several of the buildings are of the Cyclopean masonry, with massive gateways formed of three immense stones. The tombs are innumerable, and the inscriptions are in the Lycian characters, but Greek also occurs often on the same tombs. Some of these rock-tombs are adorned with fine and rich sculptures.

The Christian bishopric of Pinara, no longer a residential see, is included in the Catholic Church' list of titular sees.

== See also ==
- List of ancient Greek cities
