= Xanthus (mythology) =

Greek mythological figures

In Greek mythology, the name Xanthus or Xanthos (/ˈzænθəs/; Ancient Greek: Ξάνθος means "yellow" or "fair hair") may refer to:

- Divine
  - Xanthus, the gods' name for Scamander, the great river of Troy and its patron god.
  - Xanthus, one of the twelve sons of the god Pan who were allies of Dionysus during the latter's Indian campaign. His brothers were Aegicorus, Argennus, Argus, Celaeneus, Daphoeneus, Eugeneios, Glaucus, Omester, Philamnus, Phobus and Phorbas. Xanthos was said to have "a mane of hair like a bayard which gave that name to the horned frequenter of the rocks".
- Human
  - Xanthus, son of King Triopas and Oreasis.
  - Xanthus, an Egyptian prince as son of King Aegyptus. He was killed by his wife-cousin, the Danaid Arcadia.
  - Xanthus, a member of the Arcadian royal family as the son of Erymanthus, descendant of King Lycaon. He was the father of Psophis, one of the possible eponyms of the city of Psophis.
  - Xanthus, a Theban prince as one of the Niobids, children of King Amphion and Niobe, daughter of King Tantalus of Lydia. He was the brother of Alalcomeneus, Eudorus, Argeius, Lysippus, Phereus, Pelopia, Chione, Clytia, Hore, Lamippe and Melia.
  - Xanthus, a guest of Amphilochus and Alcinoë. Alcinoë fell in love with him so she left her family to be with Xanthus, but as they sailed away she regreted her decision, and despite Xanthus' efforts to console her, she took her life by throwing herself at the waves.
  - Xanthus, husband of Herippe.
  - Xanthus, one of the four sons of Tremiles (eponym of Tremile=Lycia) and the nymph Praxidike, daughter of Ogygus. His three brothers were Tloos, Pinarus and Cragus. This Xanthus was probably the husband of Laodamia, the daughter of Bellerophon. By her, he became the father of Sarpedon who fought in the Trojan War.
  - Xanthus, father of Glaucippe, possible mother of Hecuba. He may be the same as the above river-god Xanthus (Scamander).
  - Xanthus, a Trojan warrior and son of Phaenops. Together with his twin brother Thoon, they were killed by Diomedes during the Trojan War.
  - Xanthos (King of Thebes), the son of Ptolemy, killed by Andropompus or Melanthus.
- Equine
  - Xanthus, one of the Mares of Diomedes.
  - Xanthus, one of Achilles' two horses; see Balius and Xanthus.
  - Xanthus, one of Hector's horses.
