= Pinarus (mythology) =

In Greek mythology the son of Tremilus

In Greek mythology, Pinarus (Ancient Greek: Πίναρός Pinaros) was the eponymous founder of the Lycian city of Pinara.

== Family ==
Pinarus was the son of Tremilus who named after himself the land he settled, Tremile, which later became Lycia. His mother was the nymph Praxidice, daughter of Ogygus, and he was the brother to Tloos, Cragus and Xanthus.
