= Cragus (Cilicia) =

Ancient city in Cilicia

Cragus or Cragos or Kragos (Greek: Κράγος) was an ancient city in Cilicia, Asia Minor at the foot of Mount Cragus; its location is in modern-day Antalya Province, Turkey. Some scholars claim that it is the same city as Antiochia ad Cragum.
