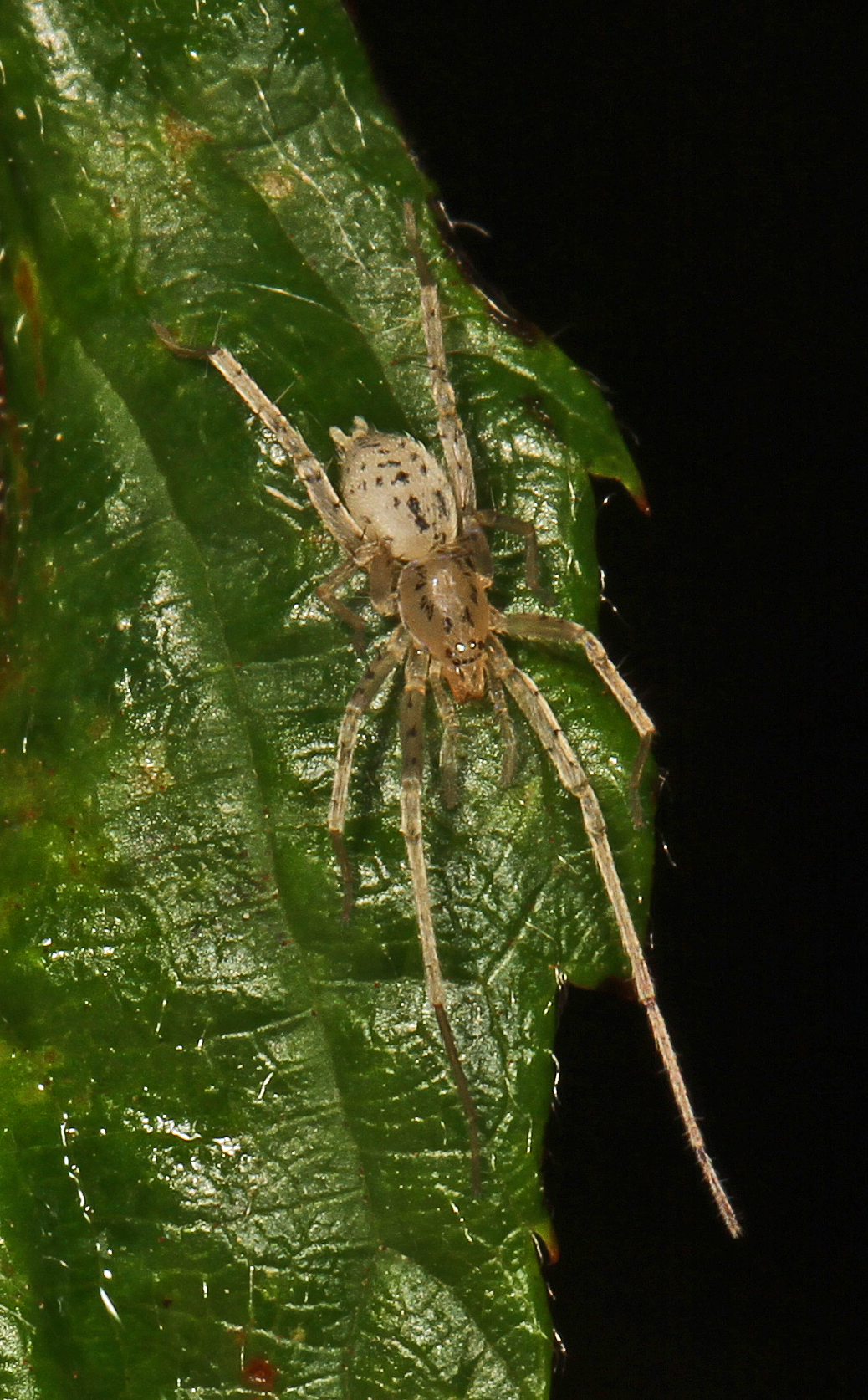

Scientific classification
- Domain: Eukaryota
- Kingdom: Animalia
- Phylum: Arthropoda
- Subphylum: Chelicerata
- Class: Arachnida
- Order: Araneae
- Infraorder: Araneomorphae
- Family: Anyphaenidae
- Genus: Wulfila
- Species: W. saltabundus

Binomial name
- Wulfila saltabundus (Hentz, 1847)

= Wulfila saltabundus =

Species of spider

Wulfila saltabundus is a species of ghost spider in the family Anyphaenidae. It is found in the United States and Canada.
