= Acer undulatum =

Conservation status
- Critically Endangered (IUCN 3.1)

Scientific classification
- Kingdom: Plantae
- Clade: Tracheophytes
- Clade: Angiosperms
- Clade: Eudicots
- Clade: Rosids
- Order: Sapindales
- Family: Sapindaceae
- Genus: Acer
- Section: Acer sect. Acer
- Series: Acer ser. Monspessulana
- Species: A. undulatum

Binomial name
- Acer undulatum Pojark. 1976

Species of maple

Acer undulatum is a species of maple, endemic to Babadağ near Fethiye in Muğla Province, southwestern Turkey, where it grows from 1,400 to 1,800 meters elevation.
