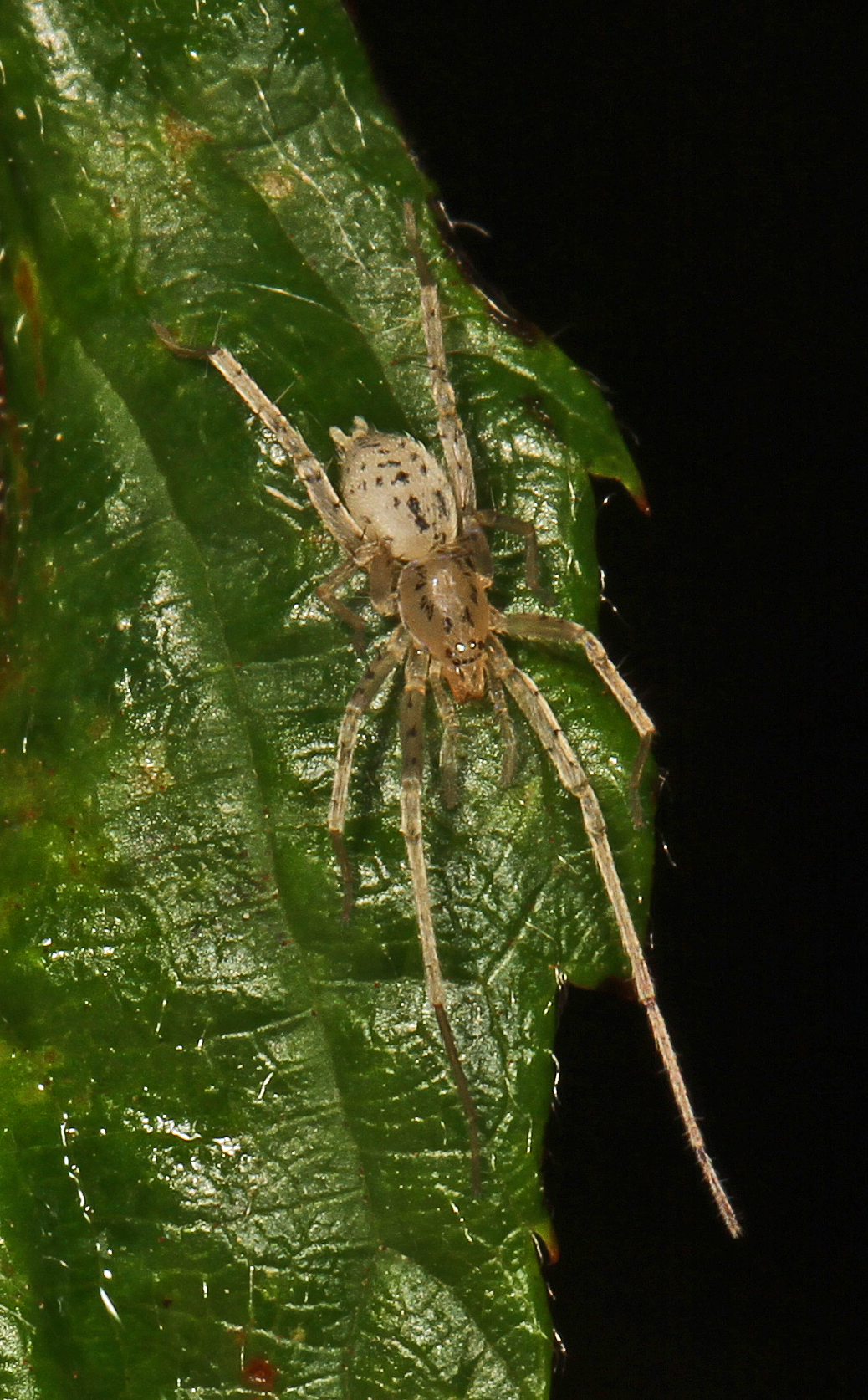
- W. saltabundus

Scientific classification
- Kingdom: Animalia
- Phylum: Arthropoda
- Subphylum: Chelicerata
- Class: Arachnida
- Order: Araneae
- Infraorder: Araneomorphae
- Family: Anyphaenidae
- Genus: Wulfila; O. Pickard-Cambridge, 1895

Type species
- W. pallidus O. Pickard-Cambridge, 1895

Species
- 48, see text

Synonyms
- Anyphaenella; Cragus

= Wulfila (spider) =

Wulfila Temporal range: Neogene–present

Genus of spiders

Wulfila is a genus of ghost spiders first described by O. Pickard-Cambridge in 1895. They are easily recognized by their pale white elongated legs.

== Species ==
As of October 2026 it contains forty-eight species:

- Wulfila albens (Hentz, 1847) — USA
- Wulfila albus (Mello-Leitão, 1945) — Brazil, Paraguay, Argentina
- Wulfila arraijanicus Chickering, 1940 — Panama
- Wulfila bryantae Platnick, 1974 — USA (Southern Florida), Mexico
- Wulfila coamoanus Petrunkevitch, 1930 — Puerto Rico
- Wulfila conchamonile Rivera-Quiroz & Álvarez-Padilla, 2019 — Mexico
- Wulfila diversus O. Pickard-Cambridge, 1895 — Mexico
- Wulfila fasciculus (Bryant, 1948) — Hispaniola
- Wulfila fragilis Chickering, 1937 — Panama
- Wulfila fragilis (Bryant, 1948) — Hispaniola
- Wulfila gracilipes (Banks, 1903) — Hispaniola
- Wulfila immaculatus Banks, 1914 — Southern Arizona, New Mexico, Cuba, Puerto Rico
- Wulfila immaculellus (Gertsch, 1933) — USA, Mexico
- Wulfila inconspicuus Petrunkevitch, 1930 — Puerto Rico
- Wulfila innoxius Chickering, 1940 — Panama
- Wulfila inornatus (O. Pickard-Cambridge, 1898) — Mexico
- Wulfila isolatus Bryant, 1942 — Puerto Rico
- Wulfila longidens Mello-Leitão, 1948 — Guyana
- Wulfila longipes (Bryant, 1940) — Cuba
- Wulfila luisi Rivera-Quiroz & Álvarez-Padilla, 2019 — Mexico
- Wulfila macer (Simon, 1898) — St. Vincent
- Wulfila macropalpus Petrunkevitch, 1930 — Puerto Rico
- Wulfila maculatus Chickering, 1937 — Panama
- Wulfila mandibulatus (Petrunkevitch, 1925) — Panama
- Wulfila modestus Chickering, 1937 — Panama
- Wulfila pallidus O. Pickard-Cambridge, 1895 — Mexico
- Wulfila phantasma Rivera-Quiroz & Álvarez-Padilla, 2019 — Mexico
- Wulfila parvulus (Banks, 1898) — Mexico
- Wulfila pavidus (Bryant, 1948) — Mexico
- Wulfila pellucidus Chickering, 1937 — Panama
- Wulfila pretiosus Banks, 1914 — Cuba
- Wulfila proximus O. Pickard-Cambridge, 1895 — Mexico
- Wulfila pulverulentus Chickering, 1937 — Panama
- Wulfila saltabundus (Hentz, 1847) — Eastern USA, southeastern Canada
- Wulfila sanguineus Franganillo, 1931 — Cuba
- Wulfila scopulatus Simon, 1897 — America
- Wulfila spatulatus F. O. Pickard-Cambridge, 1900 — Guatemala
- Wulfila spinosus Chickering, 1937 — Panama
- Wulfila sublestus Chickering, 1940 — Panama
- Wulfila tantillus Chickering, 1940 — Southern Texas to Panama
- Wulfila tauricorneus Franganillo, 1935 — Cuba
- Wulfila tenuissimus Simon, 1896 — Jamaica
- Wulfila tinctus Franganillo, 1930 — Cuba
- Wulfila tropicus Petrunkevitch, 1930 — Puerto Rico
- Wulfila unguis Rivera-Quiroz & Álvarez-Padilla, 2019 — Mexico
- Wulfila ventralis Banks, 1906 — Bahama Is.
- Wulfila wunda Platnick, 1974 — USA (Southern Florida), Cuba, Puerto Rico (Mona Is.)
- Wulfila xilitlensis Rivera-Quiroz & Álvarez-Padilla, 2019 — Mexico
