= Solymus =

In Greek mythology, Solymus or Solymos (Ancient Greek: Σολύμου) may refer to two individuals:

- Solymus, an ancestral hero and eponym of the Solymi, who inhabited Milyas (i.e the area around Solyma), in south-west Anatolia. He was a son of either Ares and Caldene, daughter of Pisidus (probably the eponym of Pisidia), or of Zeus and Chaldene or Calchedonia. Solymus was said to have married his own sister Milye, also a local eponymous heroine. Milye's second husband was named Cragus, presumed eponym of the city Cragus or Mount Cragus. It is unclear whether the name Solymus was derived from a mountain by the same name (now known as Güllük Dağ) in Anatolia, or vice versa.
- Solymus, mentioned by Ovid as a Phrygian companion of Aeneas and eponym of Sulmona.
