= Mount Cragus (Cilicia) =

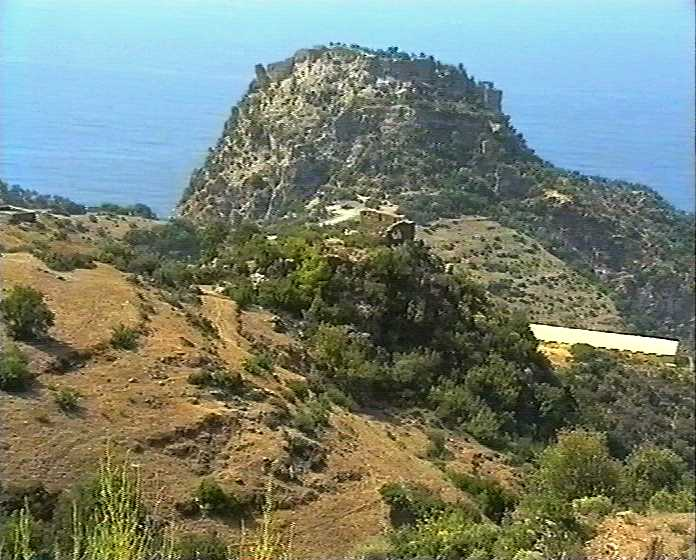
Mount Cragus

Mount Cragus or Mount Cragos or Mount Kragos (Greek: Κράγος) was a mountain in ancient Cilicia, Asia Minor; its location is in modern-day Antalya Province, Turkey. At its foot was Antiochia ad Cragum.
