= Tremilus =

In Greek mythology: the eponym of Tremile

In Greek mythology, Tremilus (Ancient Greek: Τρέμιλος, romanized: Tremilos) or Tremiles (Τρεμίλης) was the eponym of Tremile, which was later called Lycia. Another variant of his name was Termilus.

== Family ==
Tremiles was married to the nymph Praxidice, daughter of Ogygus, on silver Sibros beside the whirling river. The couple had four sons: Tloos, Pinarus, Cragus and Xanthus. In one account, all sons were mentioned except Xanthus as the progeny of Tremiles and Praxidike.

== Mythology ==
When Tremiles died, Bellerophontes renamed the Tremileis Lycians. Hekataios refers to them as Tremilas in the 4th book of his Genealogies.
