= Sidyma =

Town in ancient Lycia

Coordinates: 36°24′36.9″N 29°11′30.1″E

Sidyma (Ancient Greek: Σίδυμα), was a town of ancient Lycia, at what is now the small village of Dudurga Asari in Muğla Province, Turkey. It lies on the southern slope of Mount Cragus, to the north-west of the mouth of the Xanthus.

== History ==
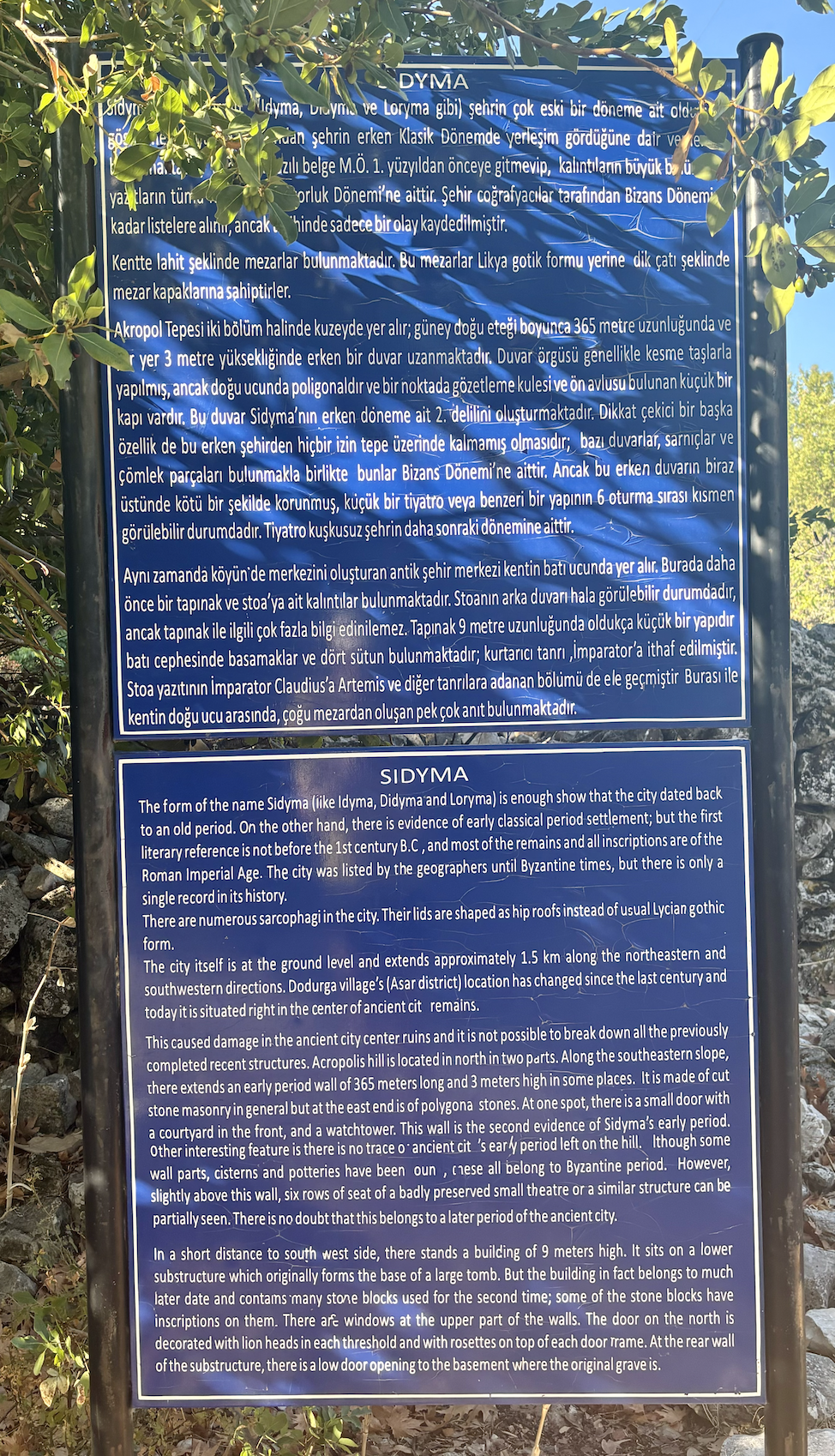
Plaque from Sidyma's agora, located in the present day village centre.

The earliest settlement of Sidyma occurred in the iron age. Sidyma was mentioned in the 1st century BC by Alexander Polyhistor, and later by Pliny the Elder, Stephanus of Byzantium, the Synecdemus, and the Notitiae Episcopatuum. The earliest documentation of the city is from 425 BC, where the city is mentioned as belonging to the Delian League.

In 334 BC Alexander the Great came to Lycia and captured the Xanthos district, of which Sidyma belonged. Later, when the Lycian League was first founded in 169 BC, Sidyma was one of the 23 founding cities. During this same period, Sidyma was granted the ability to strike its own currency, of which one coin has been found. Within the Roman period Sidyma flourished. According to legend, in the 5th century AD the future Byzantine Emperor Marcian, fell ill while on campaign and was cured by the people of Sidyma, later rewarding them for their kindness. Another version states that while still a simple soldier, he fell asleep while resting on a hunt near Sidyma, and was found to be sheltered by a large eagle, a presage of his future elevation.

Extant remains are from the time of the Roman Empire, evidence that the site held a flourishing city. While Sidyma was one of the founding cities of the Lycian League, no inscriptions have been discovered there yet.

== Contemporary Sidyma ==
Situated on the site of an ancient Lycian city, the contemporary village of Sidyma now occupies the same space, its homes and pathways intricately woven around the historic ruins that have stood for centuries. Recognising the significant historical and cultural value of this unique juxtaposition of past and present, the Mulga Conservation Commission, in 2008, declared Sidyma a first-class conservation area, ensuring that the preservation of both the modern village and the ancient ruins would be carried out with the utmost care and diligence for future generations to appreciate.

The rich history of the region has also led to Sidyma's placement on the Lycian Way, a long distance trail in southwestern Turkey. Currently, there are different hiking and trekking routes that go through or start from Sidyma. Depending in the route taken, trekkers stay or rest at local pensions, and explore the ruins of Sidyma.

== Remains ==
As Sidyma has never been officially excavated, historical and archaeological speculation has been limited to the visible ruins above the surface. The heavy cover of trees and present occupation have presented obstacles to the excavation of the area. The majority of structures which are visible are from the roman period, with the exception of some structures from the Classical Lycian period, and the remains of churches from the Byzantine period.

Acropolis + Agora

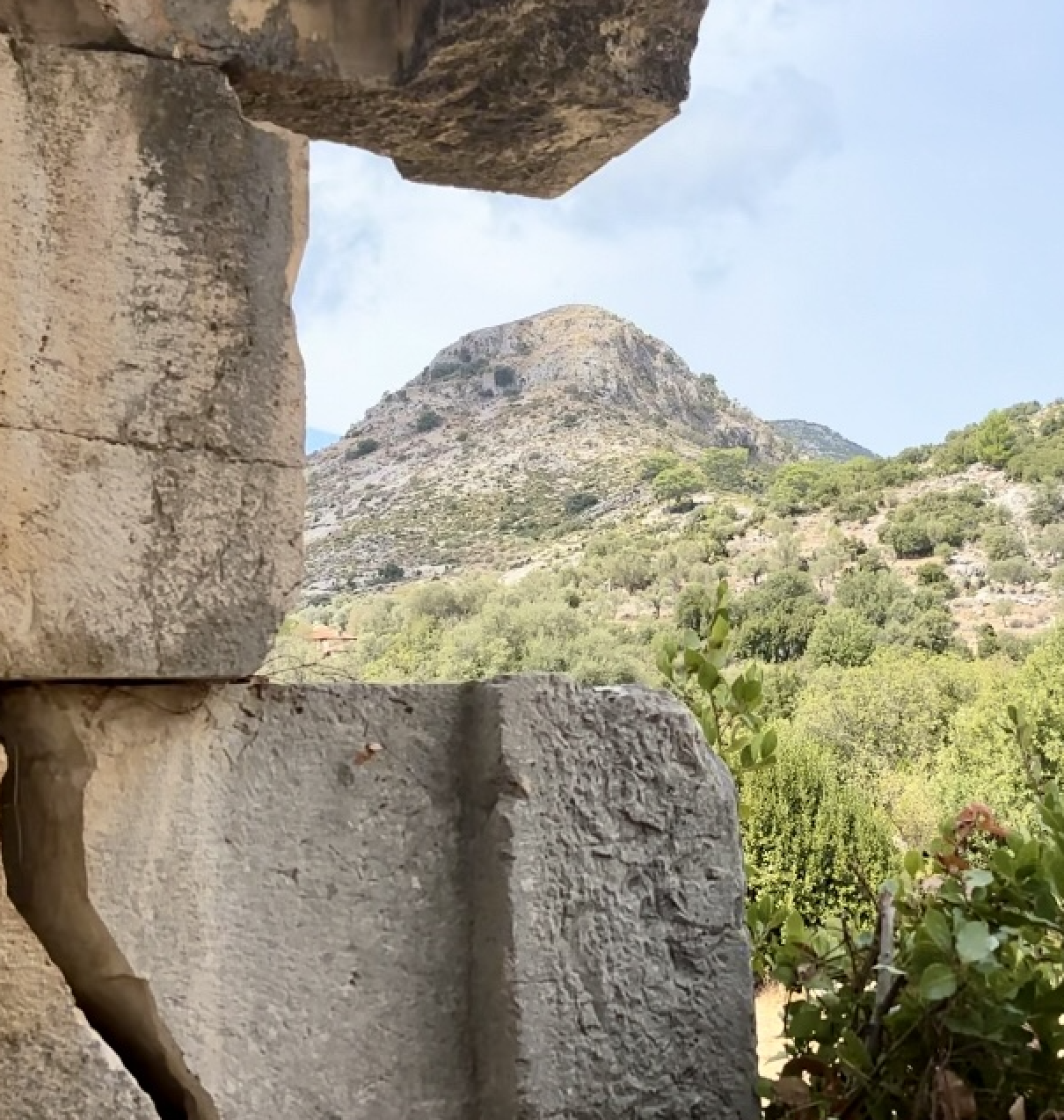
Taken from the necropolis, Sidyma's ancient acropolis once sat atop this hill.

The ruins of Sidyma, high up on the southern slope of Mount Cragus, were first discovered by Charles Fellows, who described them as consisting chiefly of splendidly built tombs, abounding in Greek inscriptions. On his journey he identified the town as possessing the ruins of a theatre, agora and temples, which were of diminutive size, but of great beauty. These features are still visible on the acropolis, along with parts of the city walls and an entryway. The north side of the acropolis, evidence of settlements remains nestled amongst contemporary village houses, some of which were constructed using the cut stones remaining in-situ from the ancient city.

There is also evidence of an agora and accompanying stoa. An inscription on the structure indicates that it was dedicated to the Emperor Claudius, and purchased by Emperor Claudius' doctor Epigapos, and his son Levianus. Additionally there are the remains of a peoples parliament with a sebasteion to dedicated to Quintus Veranius. On the east side of the sebasteion, there is an inscription indicating the presence of a gymnasium, with some portions of the walls still standing today. Evidence from the sebasteion suggests that Artemis and Apollo were principally worshiped within the city, though there is evidence of the worship of several other gods. Not far from the village centre, and ancient agora, also sits the ruins of a roman bath house where two of the arches remain visible today.

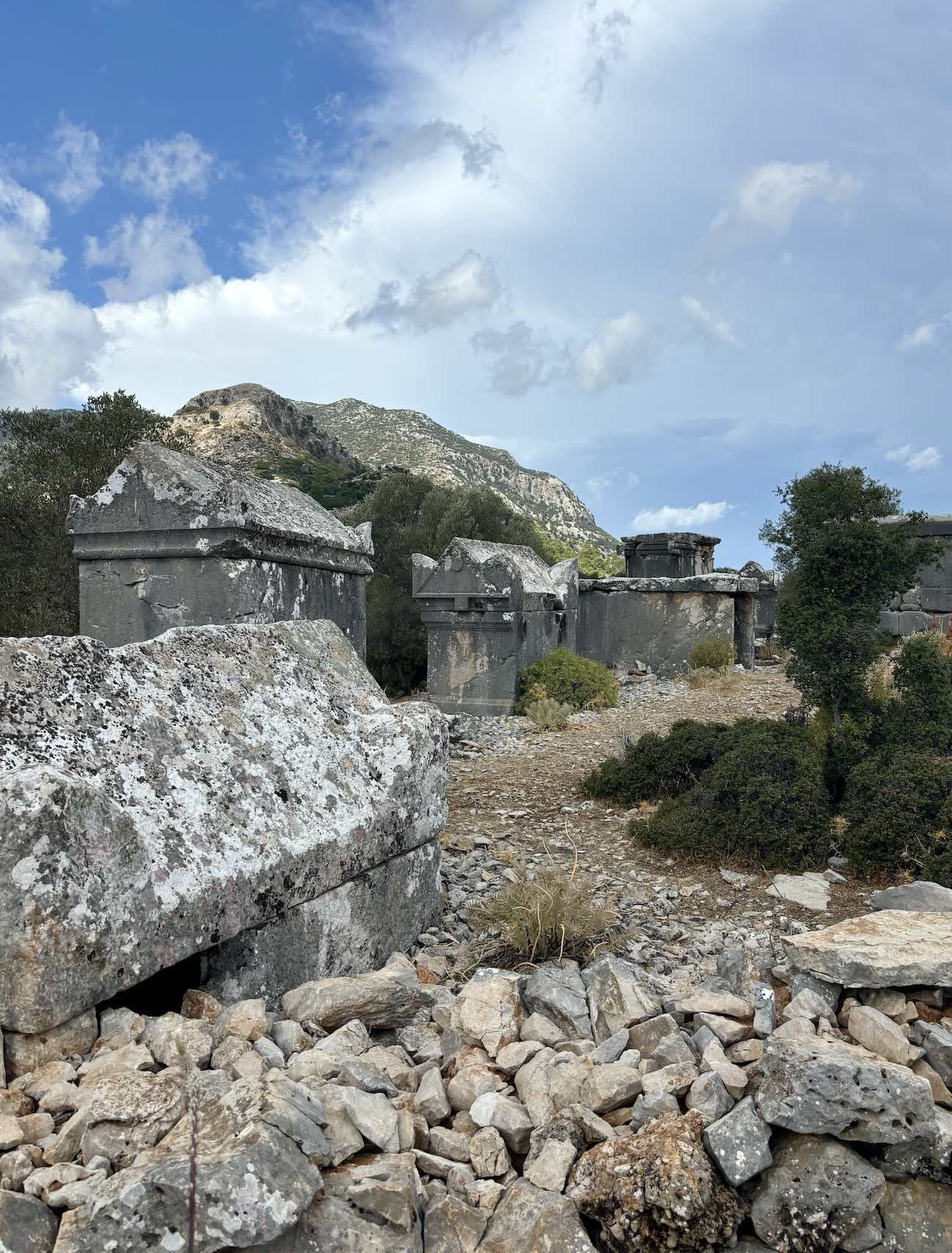
Sidyma Necropolis

Necropolis

The most prolific remains visible in Sidyma today are the graves populating the necropolis. Here, a diversity of graves can be found dating from the Classical Lycian period to the Byzantine period. 40 graves can be identified of different styles. Within the necropolis, there are sarcophagus on podiums, and "a large number of pigeon-hole tombs cut in the cliff on the left hand... reminiscent of Pinara." Traditional rock-tombs cut into the rock face have also been identified, two of which can be dated to the Roman period based on inscriptions.

Close to the village centre rests a monumental grave, notable for its 25 square soffits embedded its ceiling which still remain. In addition to flower rosettes, 8 distinctive portraits are visible. The caliber of this craft is evident of a high standard of work for the city. One of the most important graves within Sidyma is the mausoleum of Flava Nanne, an early priestess in the Roman Imperial Cult. Located centrally within the ancient city, its columns are from the doric period.

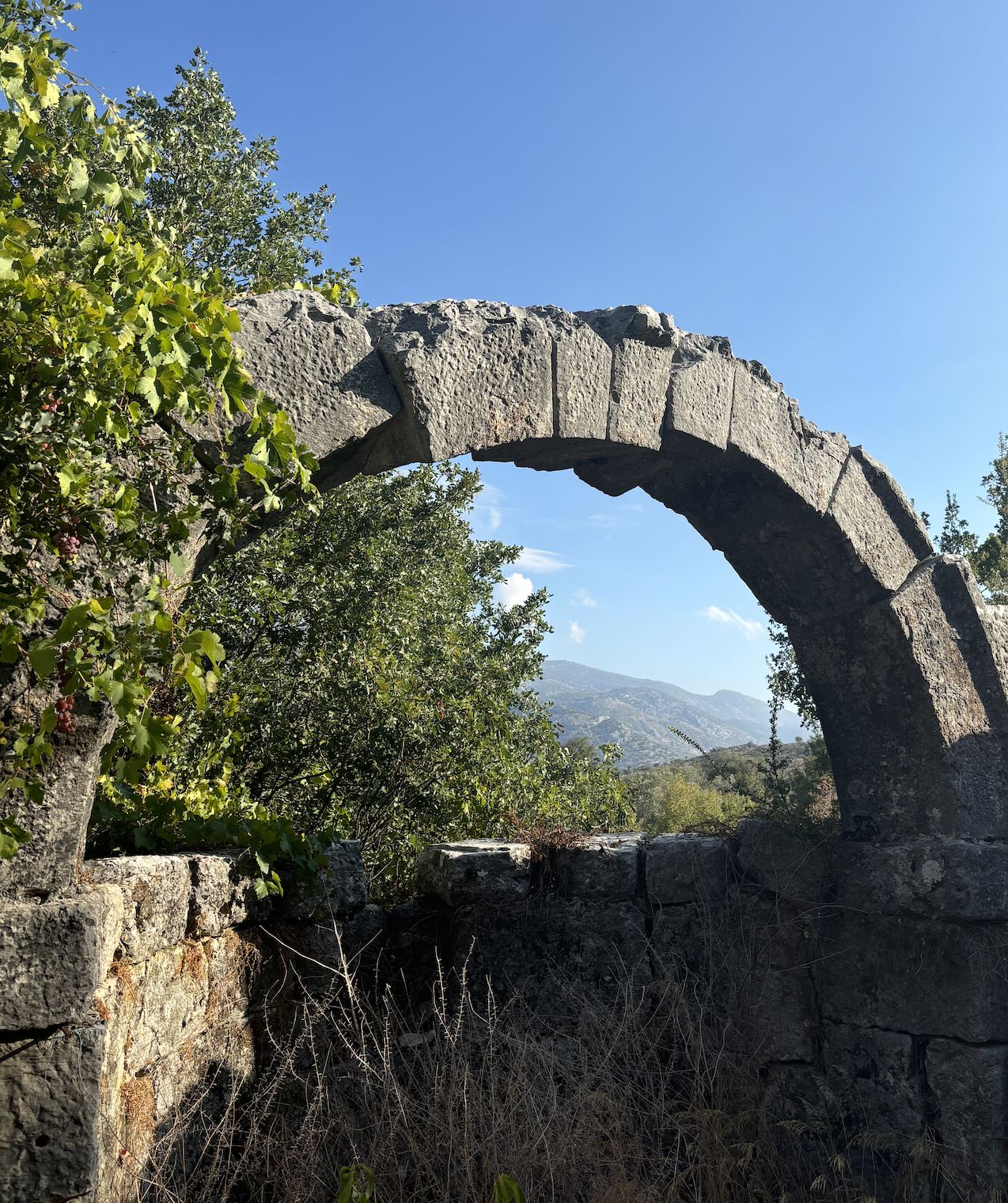
Roman Bath Ruins

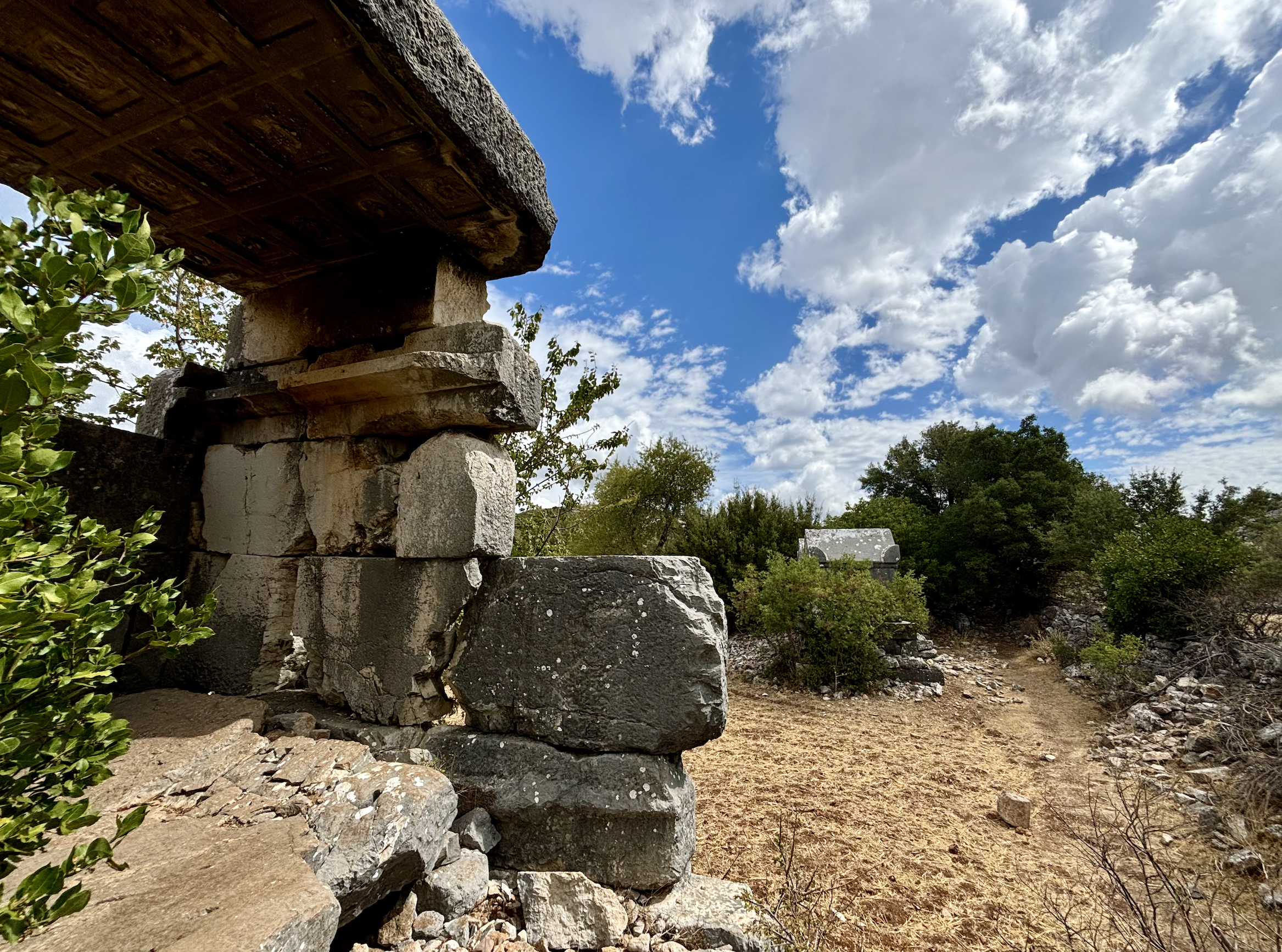
Sidyma Necropolis with Flava Nanne's tomb

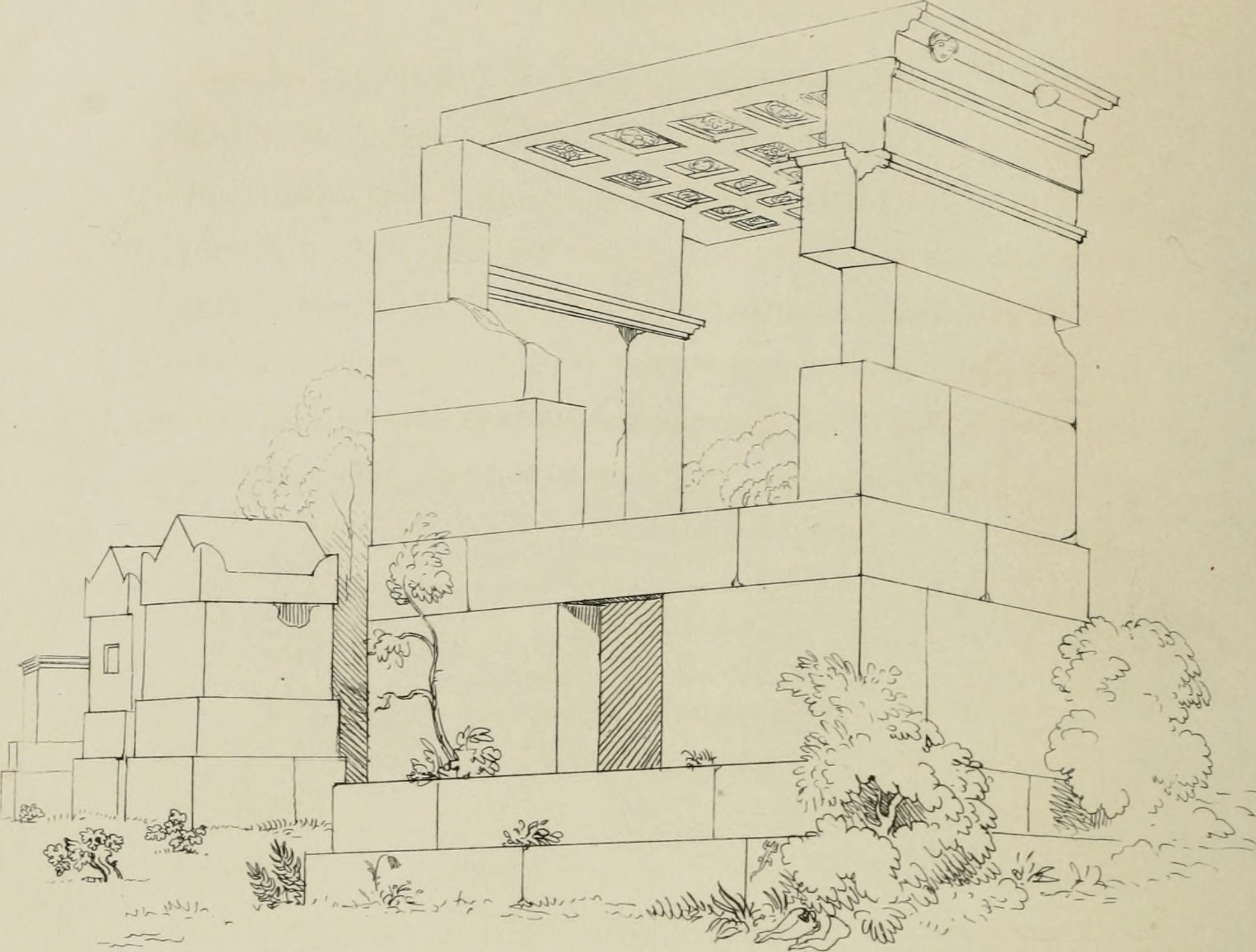
Charles Fellow's drawing of Flava Nanne's tomb from the 1800s.

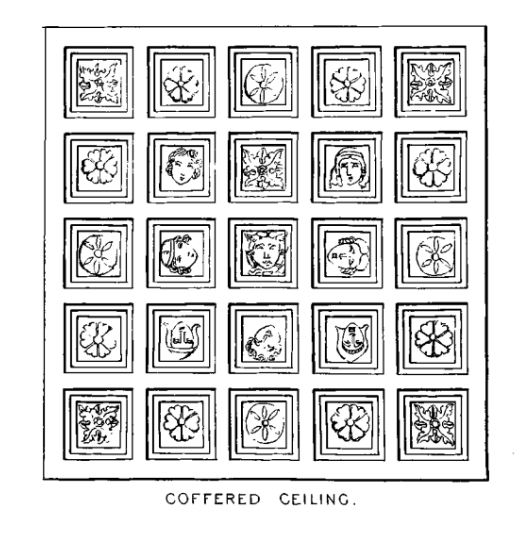
Illustration of the ceiling in Flava Nann'es tomb

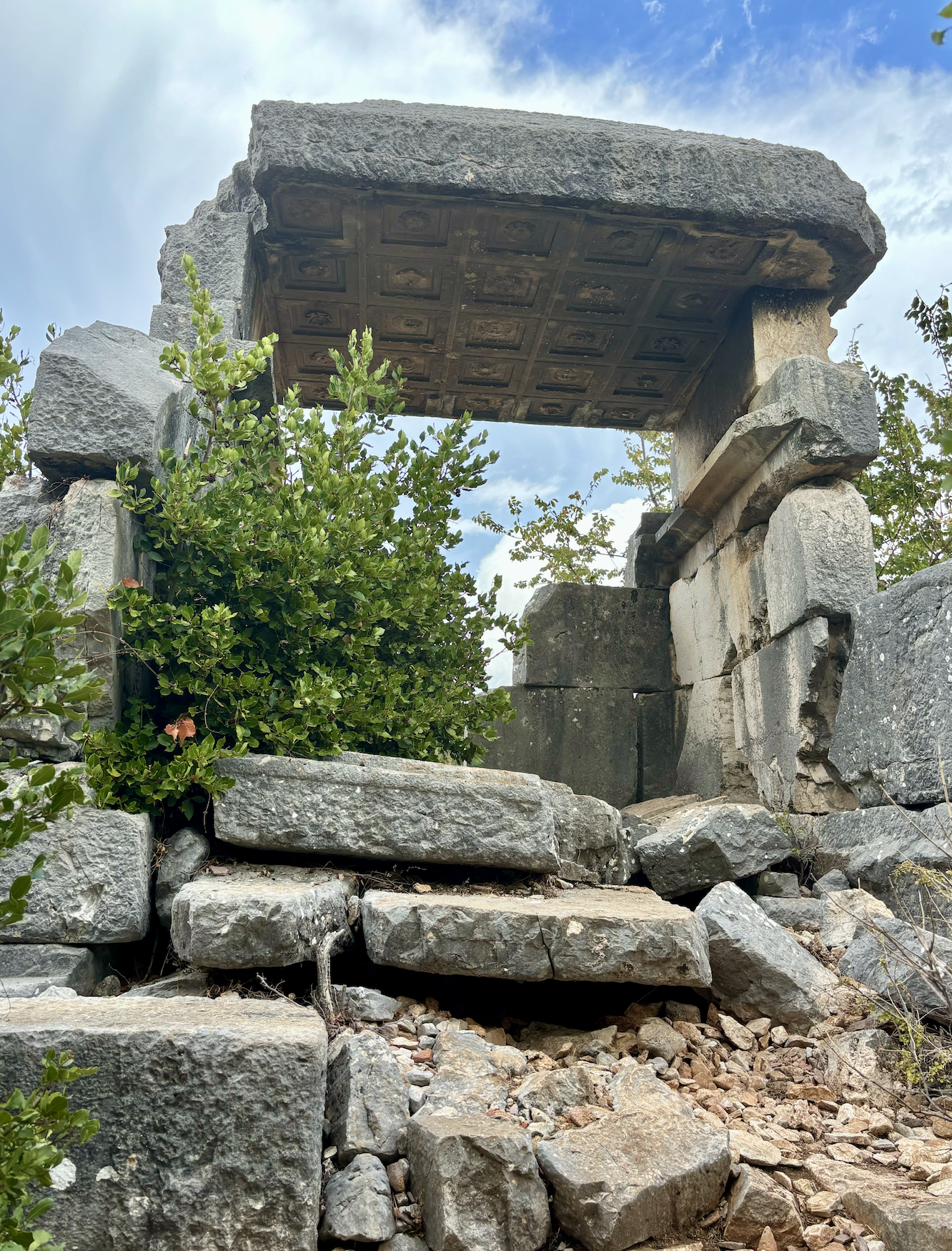
Flava Nanne's Sarcophagus

== Ecclesiastical history ==
=== Bishopric ===
Sidyma became a Christian bishopric, a suffragan of the Metropolitan see of Mira, the capital of the Roman province of Lycia. The bishop of Sidyma ranked tenth under the metropolitan of Myra.

- Its bishop Hypatius was one of the signatories of the letter that the bishops of the province sent in 458 to Byzantine Emperor Leo I the Thracian with regard to the murder of Proterius of Alexandria.
- Zemarchus was at the Third Council of Constantinople in 680 and the Trullan Council of 692.
- Nicodemus took part in the Second Council of Nicaea in 787.

The diocese continued to appear in the Notitiae Episcopatuum until the 13th century.

=== Titular see ===
No longer a residential bishopric, Sidyma is today listed by the Catholic Church as a Latin titular bishopric, the diocese being nominally revived in the 19th century.

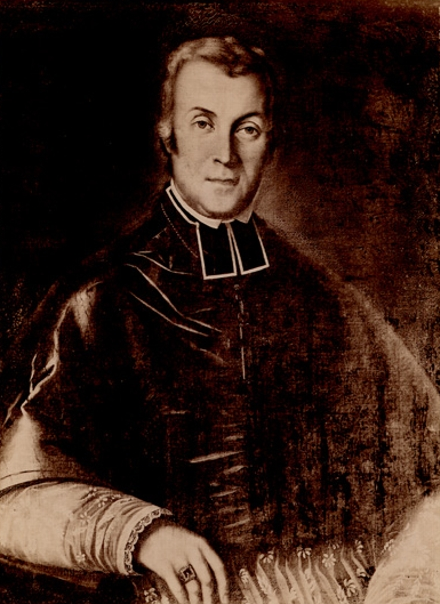
Bishop Turgeon.

It is vacant for decades, having had the following incumbents, of the lowest (episcopal) rank :

- Antoine Missirli (1808.03.18 – 1824.10.16)
- Pierre-Flavien Turgeon (1834.02.28 – 1850.10.03), as Coadjutor Archbishop of Québec (Canada) (1834.02.28 – 1850.10.03), later succeeded as Metropolitan Archbishop of Québec (1850.10.03 – 1867.08.25)
- Joseph Freusberg (1854.04.07 – 1889.11.14)
- Theophile Meerschaert (1891.06.02 – 1905.08.23)
- János Ivánkovits (1905.12.11 – 1910.03.31)
- Paul-Leon-Cornelius Montaigne (满德胎), Lazarists (C.M.) (1924.11.25 – 1962.01.09)
- Michele Federici (1962.09.22 – 1963.10.27) as Coadjutor Bishop of Melfi (Italy) (1962.09.22 – 1963.10.27), later Archbishop of Santa Severina (Italy) (1963.10.27 – 1973.12.21), Archbishop-Bishop of Ferentino (Italy) (1973.12.21 – 1980.11.23), Archbishop-Bishop of Veroli–Frosinone (Italy) (1973.12.21 – 1980.11.23)
- Karl Reiterer, Mill Hill Missionaries (M.H.M.) (1967.02.09 – 1974.12.30)

== Sources and external links ==
- GCatholic with titular incumbent bio links
