= Cragus (Lycia) =

Ancient Lycian city

Cragus or Cragos or Kragos (Greek: Κράγος) was a city of ancient Lycia, Asia Minor near or on Mount Cragus; its location is in modern-day Turkey (possibly in Muğla Province). Strabo, describes Cragus as a city amidst Mount Cragus. There are coins of the town Cragus of the Roman imperial period, with the epigraph Λυκιων Κρ. or Κρα. or Κραγ. The site of Cragus has not been determined. William Martin Leake (Geog. Journal, vol. xii. p. 164) conjectures that Cragus may be the same city as Sidyma, a place that is first mentioned by Pliny the Elder.

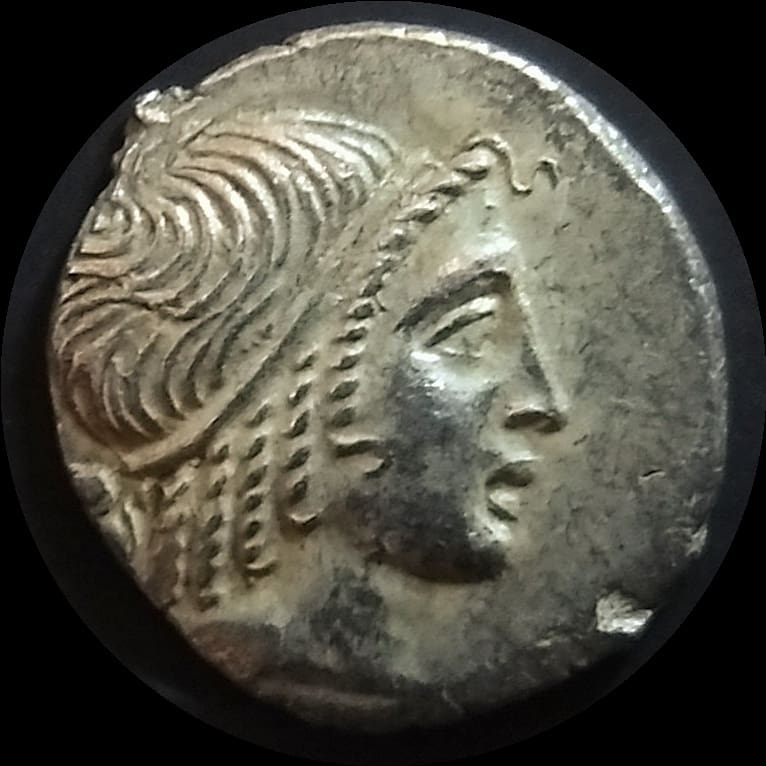
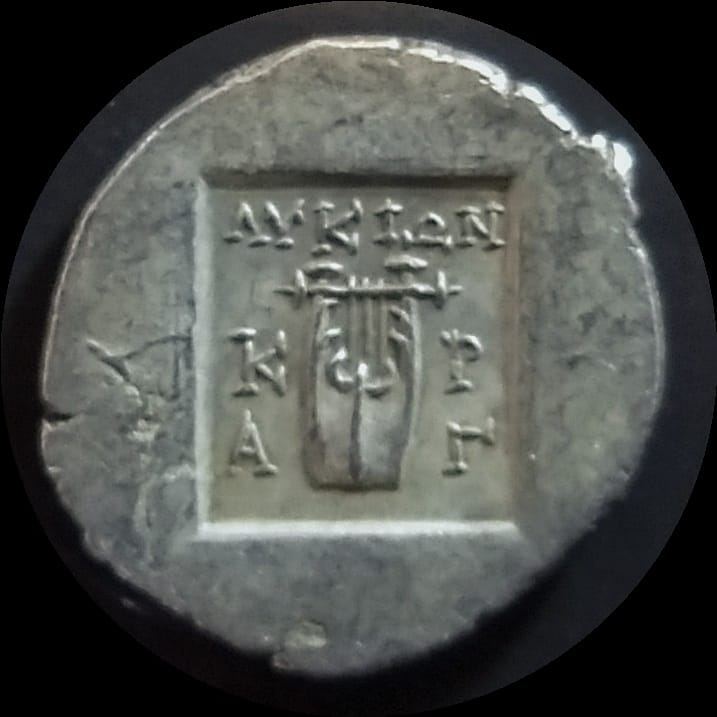
Lycian League, Cragus. Hemidrachm. Obverse: Head of Apollo, wearing taenia. Reverse: Cithara. Inscription within incuse: "ΛΥΚΙΩΝ" (Lycia), "KPΑΓ" (Κράγος)
